= Minden (1985 ship) =

The Minden is a ship built in 1985 as a lifeboat as one of a series of seven rescue cruisers (Seenotkreuzern, SK) of the Deutschen Gesellschaft zur Rettung Schiffbrüchiger (DGzRS, German Sea Rescue Society) in the 23.3 Meter class. The ships were built between 1980 and 1991 by the Schweers shipyard in Berne-Bardenfleth and Abeking & Rasmussen in Lemwerder.

== Design details ==
The hull of these ships is made of seawater-resistant aluminum, which was built in a net frame system. It is powered by two MTU V10 diesel engines with 2 turbochargers each and fully modulatable Twin Disc MG 530M Omega gearboxes, each of which drives a propeller. The total output is 1944hp. The cruisers are controlled from an upper open control point or from the lower control point in the deckhouse. The cruiser has a daughter boat for rescuing shipwrecked people and for traveling in shallow water, which is carried in a cradle at the stern and can automatically move in and out. The cruiser and daughter boat are designed to be self-righting and will right themselves after capsizing. The fire extinguishing equipment includes a pump with a capacity of 380m³/h with a throw of 90 meters and a stationary, remote-control monitor. The cruiser also has a tow hook, various powerful headlights, an on-board hospital with medical equipment, living quarters for the crew, various mobile rescue equipment, mobile bilge pumps and extensive navigation and radio equipment.

== History ==
Minden was built in 1985 by the Abeking & Rasmussen shipyard in Lemwerder under construction number 6396. The DGzRS internal designation was KRS 16. The daughter boat of the cruiser had the internal designation KRT 16.

The cruiser was named at a ceremony in Lemwerder on August 3, 1985 in honour of the numerous donors in favour of the DGzRS from the state of North Rhine-Westphalia in the name of the city of Minden located there. The godmother was the wife of the then mayor of Minden, Helga Röthemeier. The daughter boat was christened Margarete at the request of an anonymous donor.

From June 1985 to May 1989, Minden was stationed in Wilhelmshaven; in June 1989 the vessel was relocated to List on the island of Sylt. On November 16, 2013, Minden was officially decommissioned and sold to a private person.

The ship was used in the Aegean Sea from March 2016 to early July 2016 to save refugees from drowning. The team consisted of voluntary sea rescuers from the DGzRS and rescue workers from the German Life Saving Association (DLRG). As part of the temporary operation, in close cooperation with the Greek coast guard, more than 1,100 people were rescued from danger at sea within a very short time, including around 400 women and children. The ship was made available free of charge by the new owner.

From the beginning of July 2016 to September 2017, Minden was used by the donation-financed 'LifeBoat gGmbH' for sea rescue in the sea area between Libya and Lampedusa.

In December 2019, the former Minden was under a new name, Janus, and located in Abidjan (Ivory Coast).
