= German Sea Rescue Society =

National organisation responsible for search and rescue in Germany's territorial waters

Deutsche Gesellschaft zur Rettung Schiffbrüchiger
- Racing stripe

- DGzRS logo
- Formation: 29 May 1865
- Legal status: Charity
- Purpose: Saving lives at sea
- Headquarters: Bremen
- Region served: North Sea; Baltic Sea
- Staff: 185
- Volunteers: 800
- Website: dgzrs.de

The German Maritime Search and Rescue Service (German: Deutsche Gesellschaft zur Rettung Schiffbrüchiger - DGzRS, German pronunciation: [deːɡeːt͡sɛtʔɛʁˈʔɛs]; lit. German Society for the Rescue of Shipwrecked Persons) is a membership organisation in Germany. It is responsible for Search and Rescue in German territorial waters in the North Sea and the Baltic Sea, including the Exclusive Economic Zone.

The headquarters and the Maritime Rescue Coordination Centre of the Society are located in Bremen. It was founded in Kiel on 29 May 1865. It owns 60 lifeboats at 55 stations which are operated by 185 employed crew members and 800 volunteers. The society has about 2000 engagements every year. Up to 2019, it rescued approximately 85,000 persons. In 2019 it saved 81 lives, rescued 270 persons from critical situations and carried out 373 medical transports. The DGzRS is entirely financed by membership fees, private donations and legacies.

Writer and honorary member Nikolai von Michalewsky has immortalized the DGzRS in his series of science fiction novels by taking it as the model for his "Independent Society for Saving Spacewrecked".

A different organisation is the German Life Saving Association which primarily wants to prevent swimmers from drowning. It gives swimming lessons and provides lifesavers for the coast and inland waters. The DGzRS concentrates on maritime emergencies that usually involve shipwrecking or other maritime incidents.

== Fleet ==
The DGzRS operates 59 vessels on 55 stations in the North Sea and Baltic, 20 of which are seagoing cruisers (German: Seenotrettungskreuzer) between 20 m and 46 m of length, and 39 vessels are classified as inshore lifeboats (German: Seenotrettungsboote). A feature of the cruisers is that all but the 20-m class carry a fully equipped small lifeboat on deck which can quickly be released through a gate in the aft for conducting operations in shallow waters. This principle was developed by DGzRS in the 1950s. The 20-m class uses a rigid-hulled inflatable boat instead.

All DGzRS vessels are self-righting, i.e. if they capsize, they right themselves again.

=== Lifeboats ===
Name	Station	Remarks
46-m class
Length 46,0m – Beam 10,66m – Draught 2,80m – Displacement 404t – 3 Engines Σ 9.250hp (6.803kW) – Speed. 25knots
Hermann Marwede	Heligoland	biggest ship of the DGzRS, biggest SAR ship worldwide, biggest self-righting ship worldwide
36.5-m class
Length 36,5m – Beam 7,8 – Draught 2,70m – Displacement 236 t – 3 Engines Σ 6.508hp (4.785kW) – Speed. 25 knots
Harro Koebke	Sassnitz	
28-m class
Length 27,9 – Beam 6,2m – Draught 1,95m – Displacement 120t – 2 Engines Σ 3.916hp (2.880kW) – Speed. 24 knots
Ernst Meier-Hedde	Amrum	
Berlin	Laboe	
Anneliese Kramer	Cuxhaven	
Hamburg	Borkum	
Felix Sand	Grömitz	
Nis Randers	Darßer Ort	
27.5-m class
Length 27,5m – Beam 6,5m – Draught 2,1m – Displacement 103t – 3 Engines Σ 3.282hp (2.420kW) – Speed. 23 knots
Arkona	Warnemünde	
Bremen	Großenbrode	
23.1-m class
Length 23,1m – Beam 6,0m – Draught 1,6m – Displacement 80t – 2 Engines Σ 2.700hp (1.986kW) – Speed 25 knots
Hermann Rudolf Meyer	Bremerhaven	
Bernhard Gruben	Hooksiel	
Hans Hackmack	Reliefboat	
Theo Fischer	Reliefboat	
20-m class
Length 19,91 – Beam 5,0m – Draught 1,3m – Displacement 40t – 1 Engine 1.630hp (1.232kW) – Speed 25 knots
Eiswette	Nordstrand	
Eugen	Norderney	
Theodor Storm	Büsum	
Pidder Lüng	List/Sylt	
Fritz Knack	Maasholm	
Berthold Beitz	Greifswalder Oie	

=== Voluntary Lifeboats ===
Name	Station	Remarks
10,1m class
Paul Neisse	Eiderdamm	
Kurt Hoffmann	Glowe	
Horst Heiner Kneten	Hörnum	
Nausikaa	Vitte-Hiddensee	
Konrad Otto	Kühlungsborn	
Henrich Wuppesahl	Neustadt in Holstein	
Secretarius	Langeoog	
Fritz Thieme	Wangerooge	
Nimanoa	Damp	
Wolfgang Wiese	Timmendorf	
Ursula Dettmann	Gelting	
Mervi	Neustadt in Holstein	SAR-School
Gerhard Elsner	Schilksee	
Peter Habig	Wilhelmshaven	
Wolfgang Paul Lorenz	Puttgarden	
Romy Frank	Horumersiel	
Erich Koschubs	Travemünde	
Otto Diersch	Norddeich	
9,5m class
Wilma Sikorski	Norddeich	
Gillis Gillbranson	Brunsbüttel	
Werner Kuntze	Langballigau	
Heinz Orth	Freest	
Hertha Jeep	Stralsund	
Hans Ingwersen	Travemünde	
Emil Zimmermann	Fedderwardersiel	
Neuharlingersiel	Neuharlingersiel	
Heiligenhafen	Heiligenhafen	
Casper Otten	Lauterbach	
Woltera	Lippe	
Walter Rose	Neustadt in Holstein	SAR-School
Eckernförde	Eckernförde	
Elli Hoffmann-Röser	Baltrum	

== Gallery ==
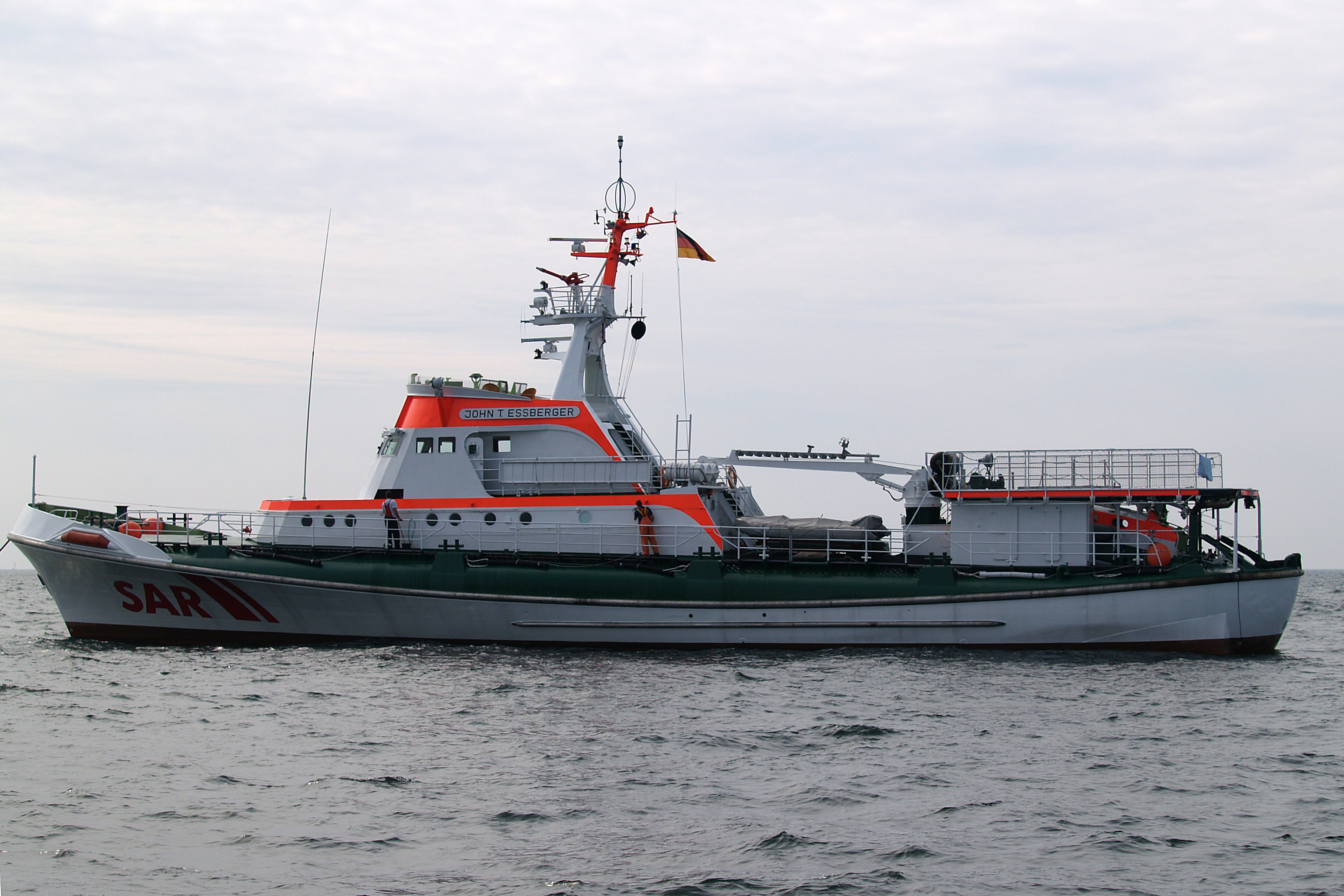
SK John T. Essberger, one of the large 44m-class cruisers of the DGzRS

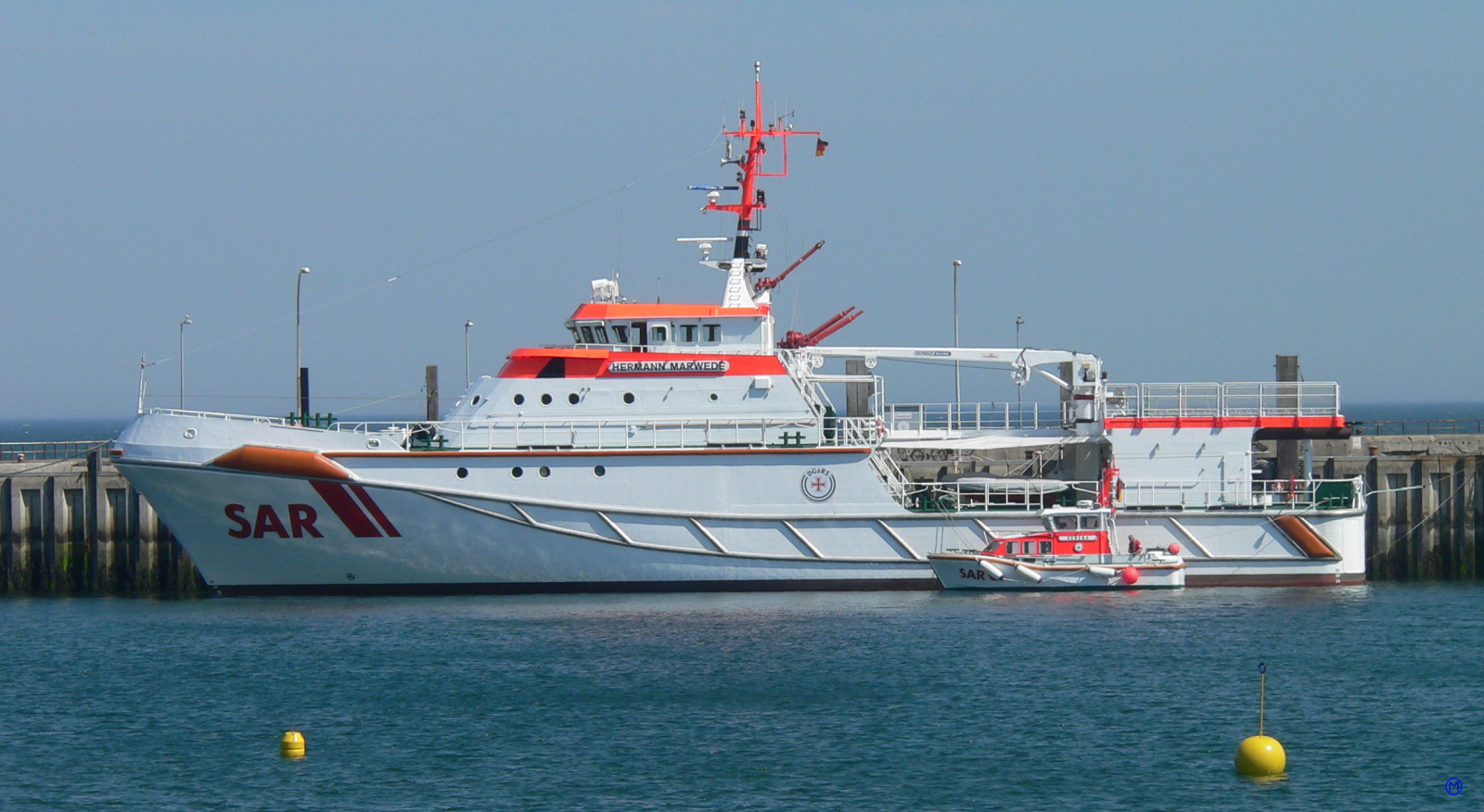
SK Hermann Marwede, the only one of the large 46m-class cruisers of the DGzRS

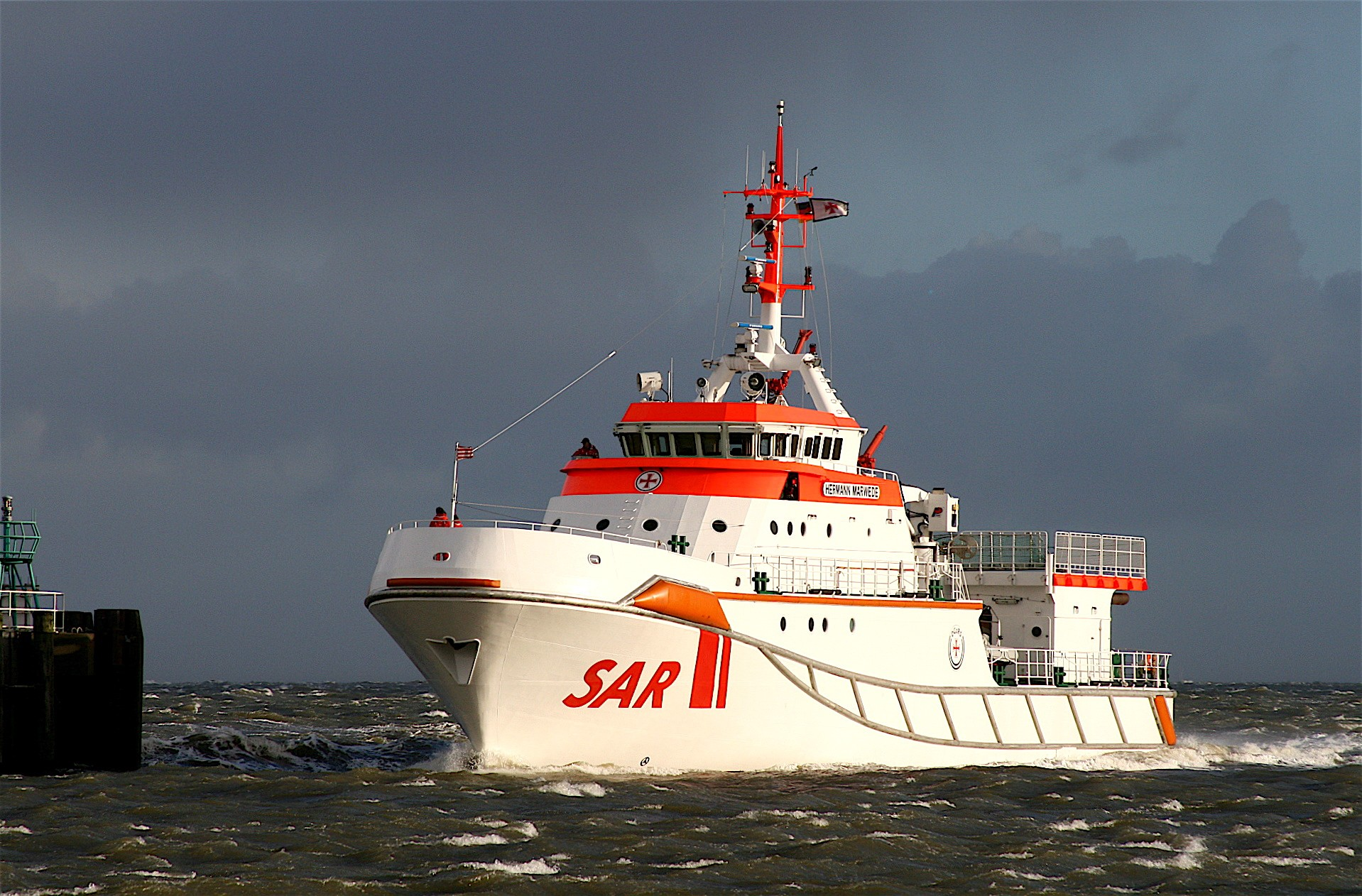
The Marwede at sea

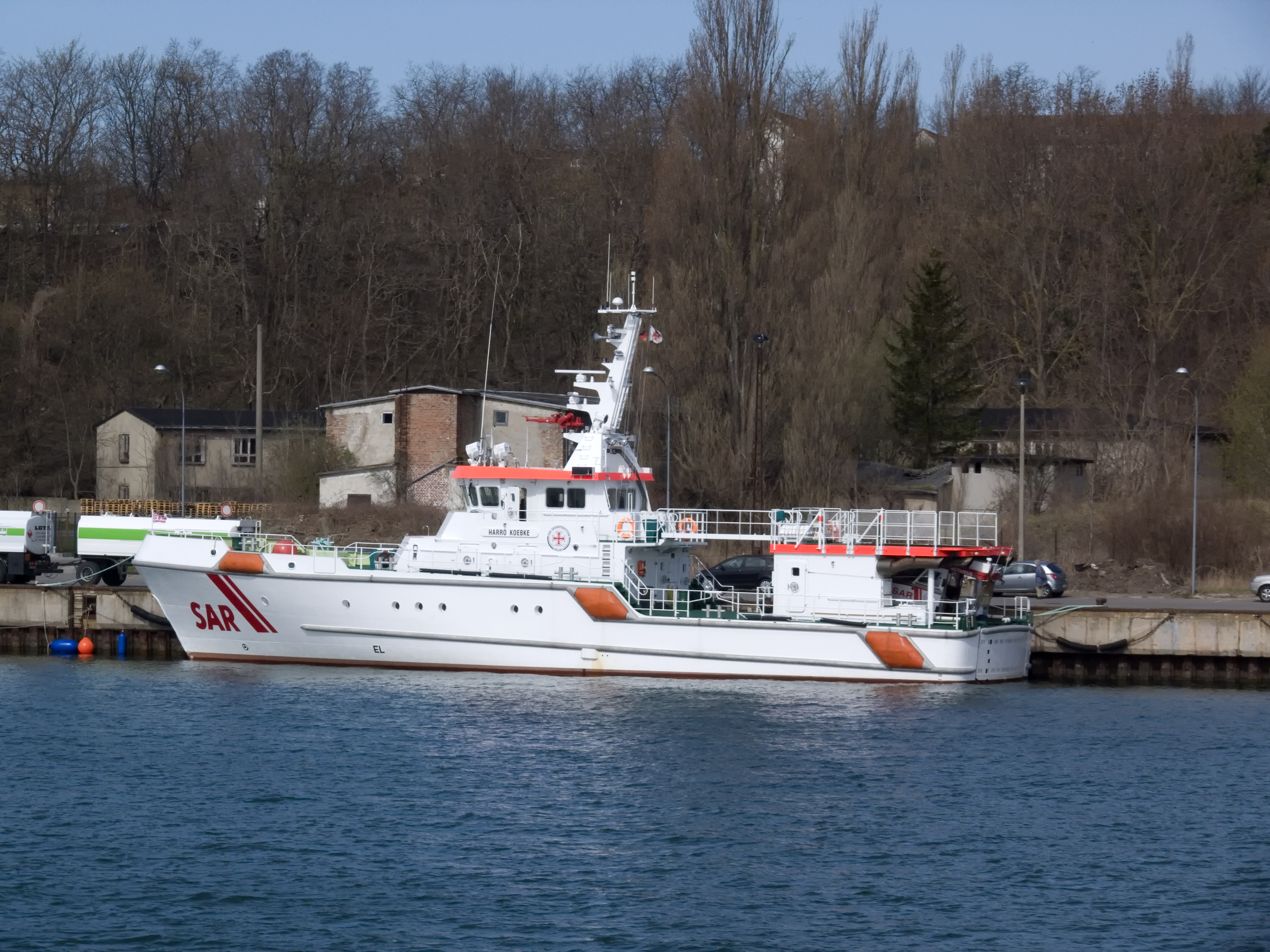
SK Harro Koebke the large 36,5m-class for the Baltic Sea in Sassnitz

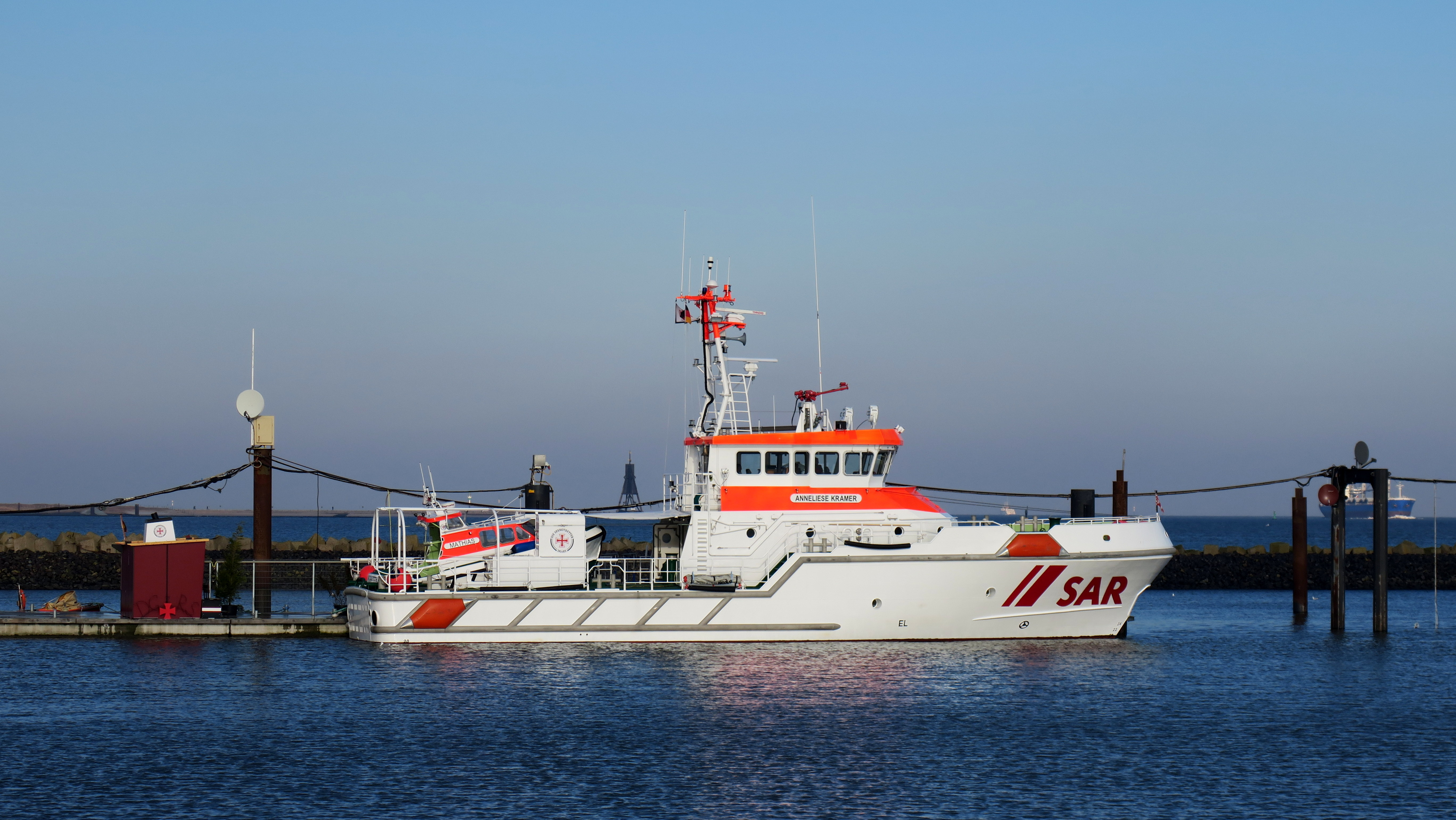
SK Anneliese Kramer the new 28m-class for Cuxhaven

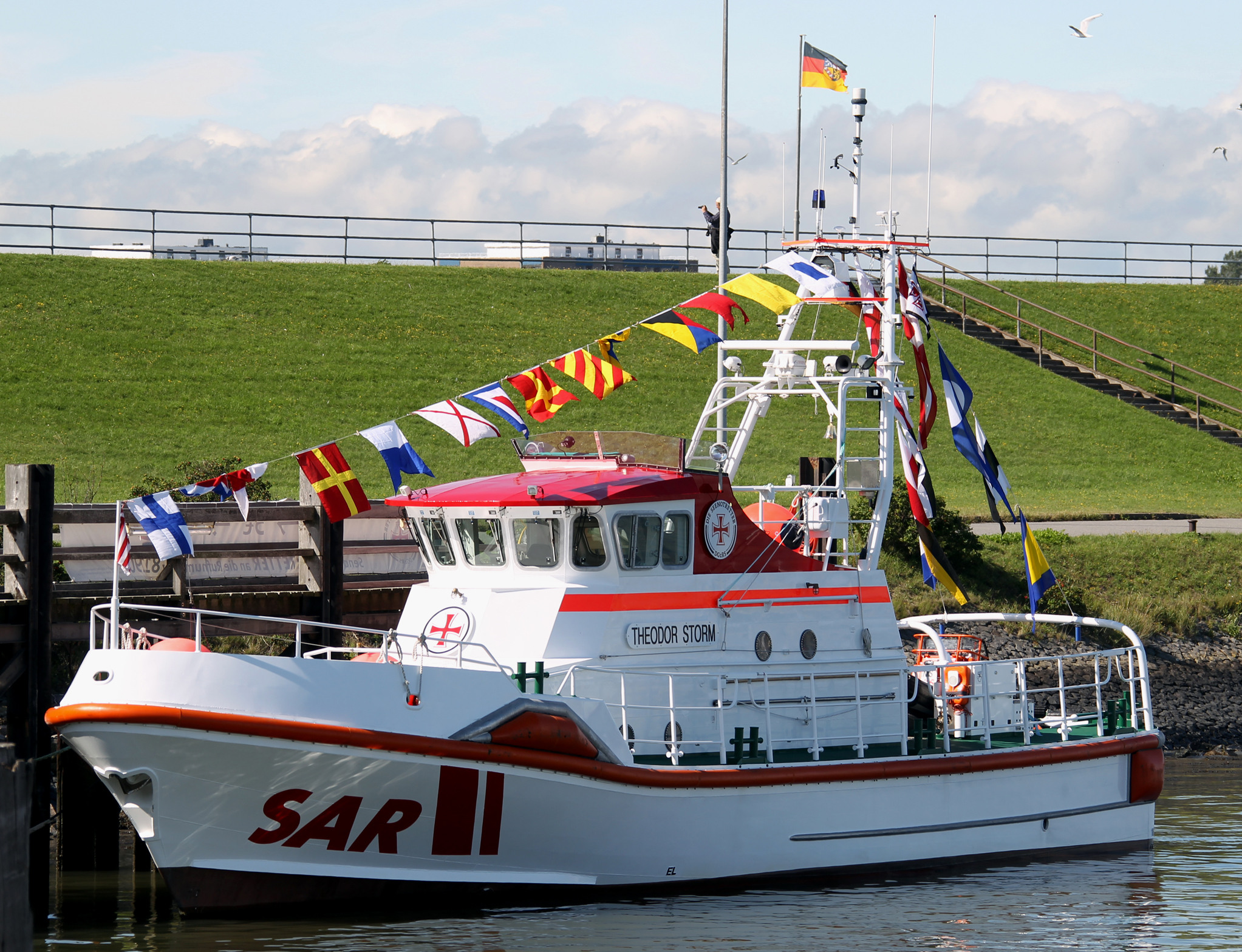
SK Theodor Storm a 20m-class cruiser

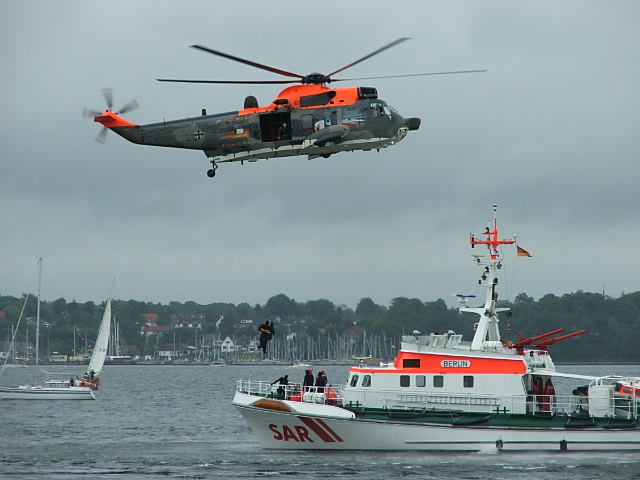
SK Berlin, a 27m-class cruiser of the DGzRS, and a SeaKing helicopter of the German Navy

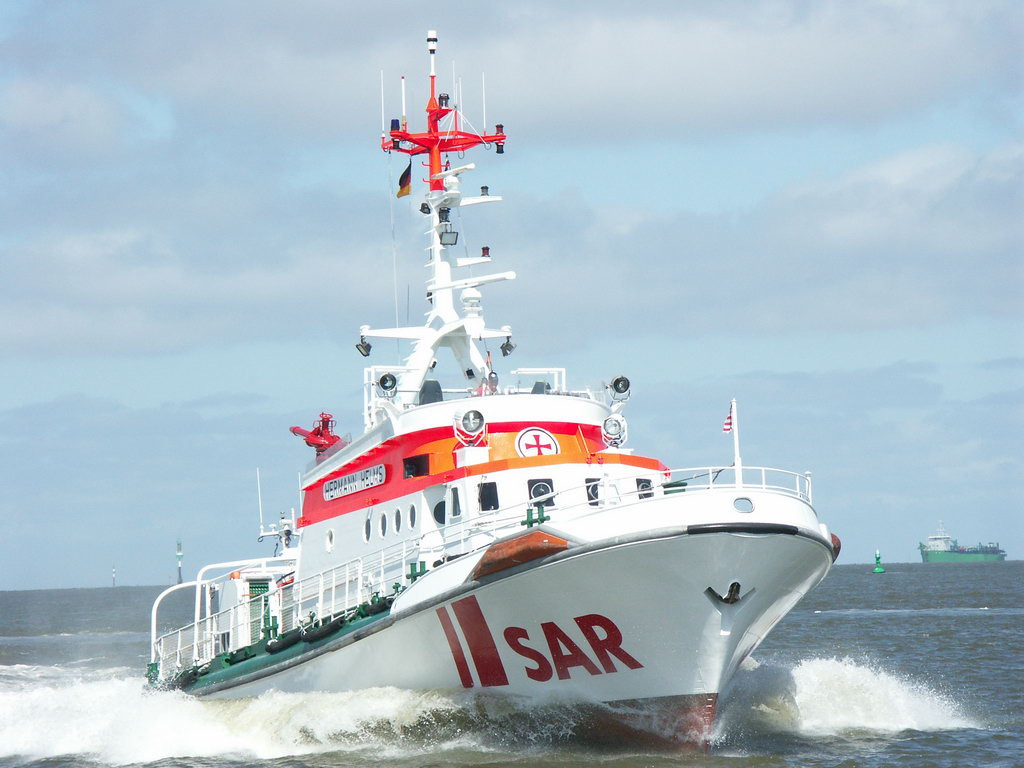
SK Herman Helms, a cruiser of the 27m-class

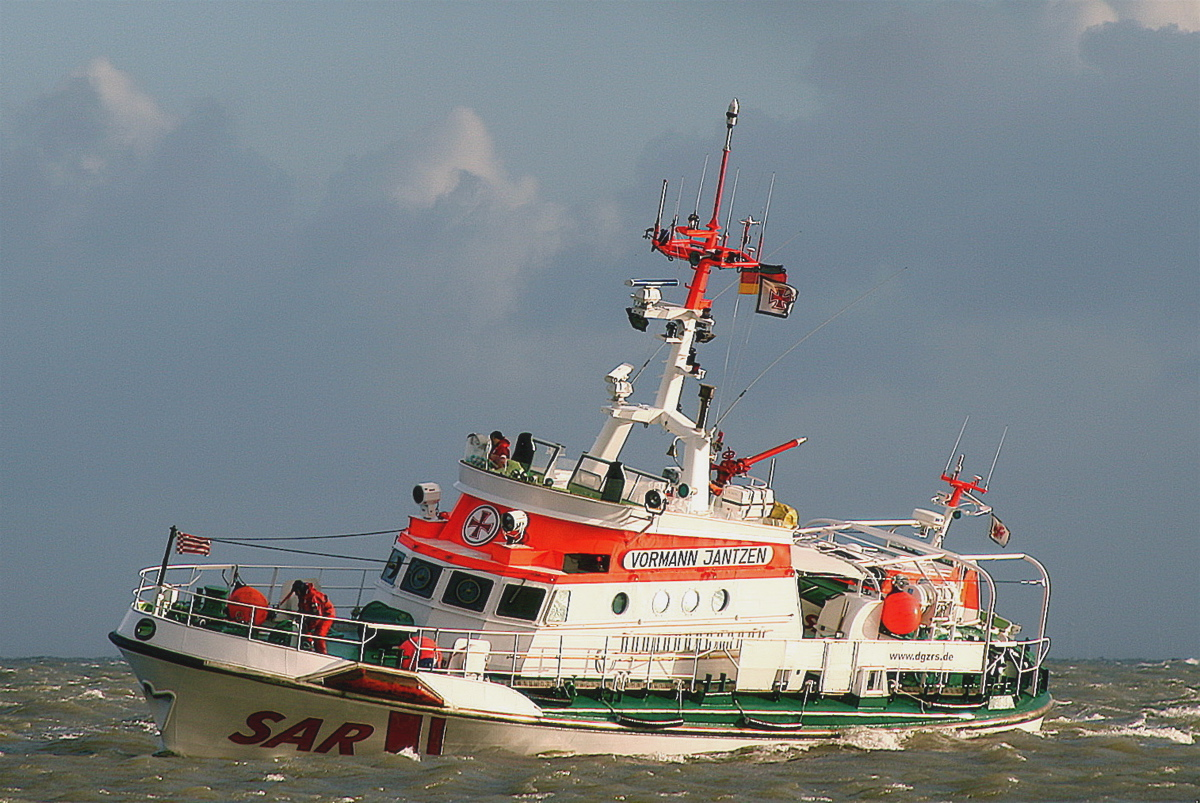
SK Vormann Jantzen

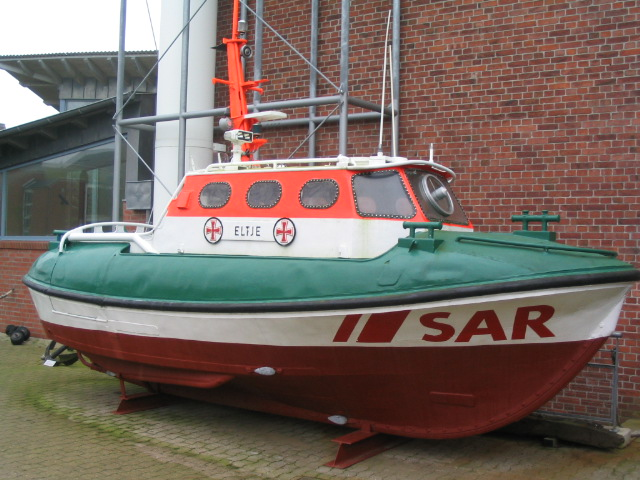
S&R boat Eltje

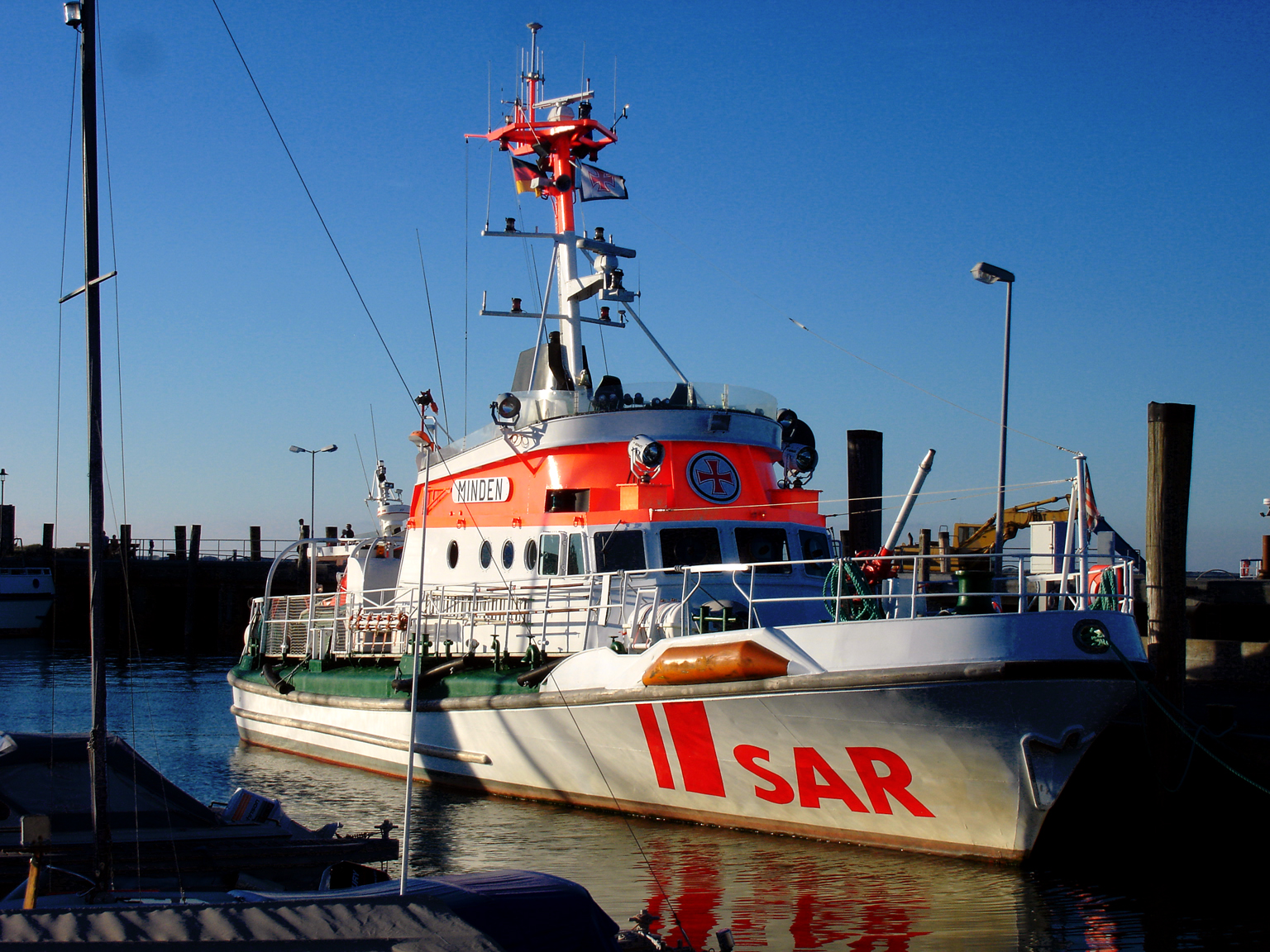
SK Minden in the port of Sylt island

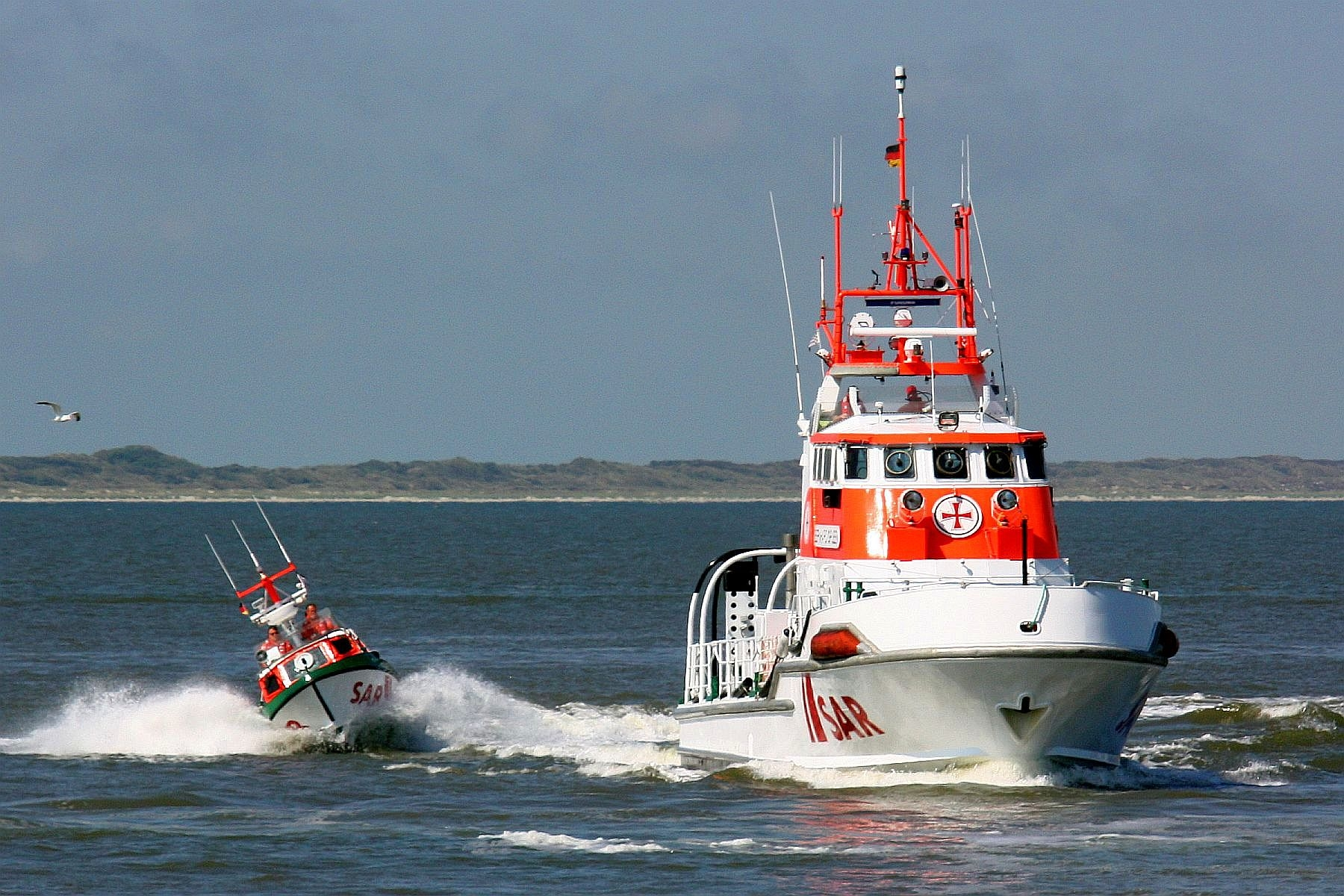
SK Bernhard Gruben with daughter boat during an exercise in the North Sea off Juist island

== See also ==
- German Federal Coast Guard
