= Lifeboat (rescue) =

Rescue craft used to attend a vessel in distress or survivors

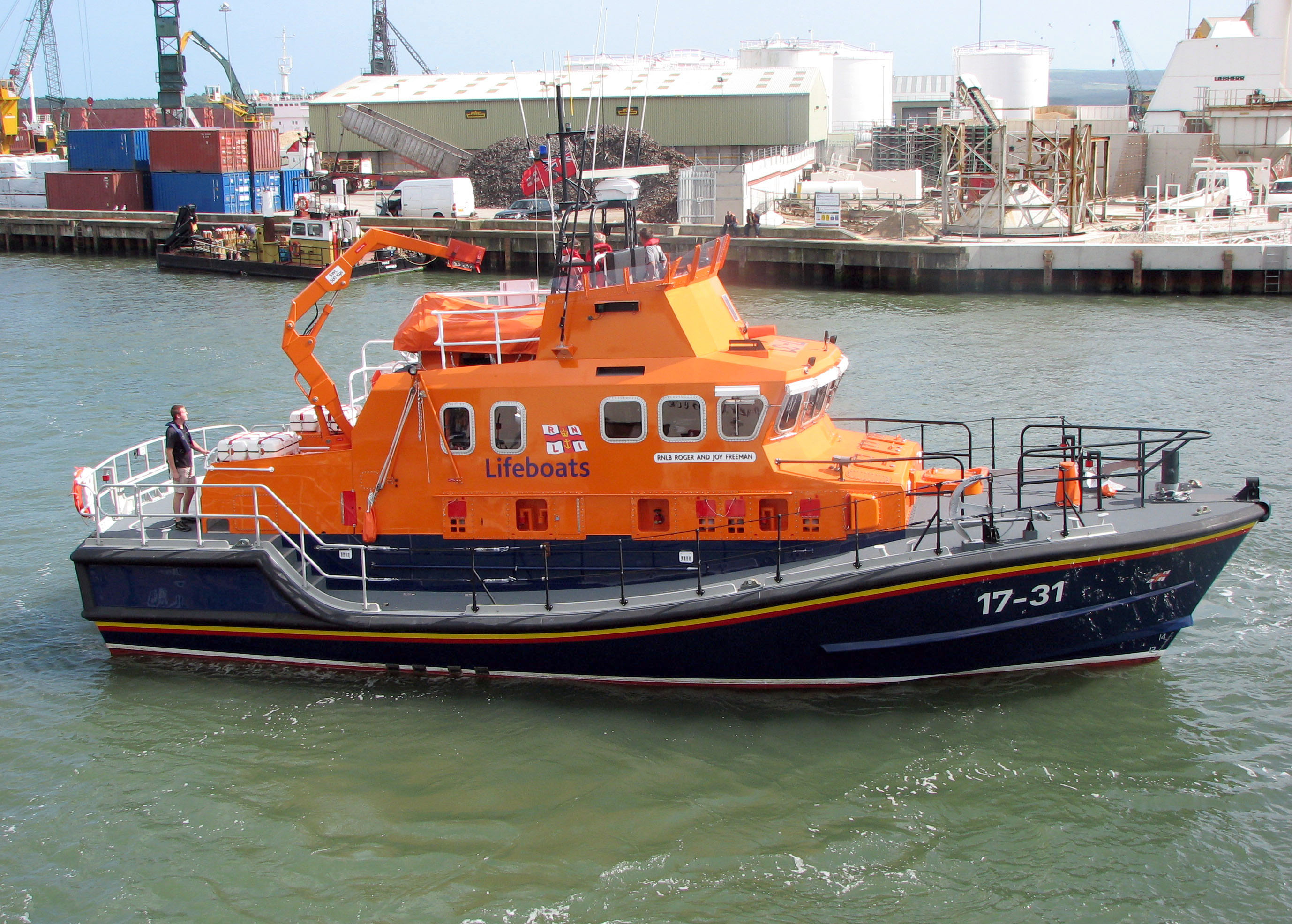
A RNLI rescue lifeboat.

A rescue lifeboat is a boat rescue craft which is used to attend a vessel in distress, or its survivors, to rescue crew and passengers. It can be hand pulled, sail powered or powered by an engine. Lifeboats may be rigid, inflatable or rigid-inflatable combination-hulled vessels.

== Overview ==
There are generally three types of boat, in-land (used on lakes and rivers), in-shore (used closer to shore) and off-shore (into deeper waters and further out to sea). A rescue lifeboat is a boat designed with specialised features for searching for, rescuing and saving the lives of people in peril at sea or other large bodies of water.

In the United Kingdom and Ireland rescue lifeboats are typically vessels crewed by volunteers, intended for quick dispatch, launch and transit to reach a ship or individuals in trouble at sea. Off-shore boats are referred to as 'All-weather' and generally have a range of 150–250 nautical miles. Characteristics such as capability to withstand heavy weather, fuel capacity, navigation and communication devices carried, vary with size.

A vessel and her crew can be used for operation out to 20 nautical miles (37 km) away from a place of safe refuge, remaining at or on the scene to search for several hours, with fuel reserves sufficient for returning; operating in up to gale force sea conditions; in daylight, fog and darkness. A smaller inshore rescue boat (IRB) or inshore life boat (ILB) and her crew would not be able to withstand (or even survive) these conditions for long.

In countries such as Canada and the United States, the term 'motor lifeboat', or its US military acronym MLB, is used to designate shore-based rescue lifeboats which are generally crewed by full-time coast guard service personnel. These vessels stay on standby service rather than patrolling in the water, like a crew of fire fighters standing by for an alarm. In Canada, some lifeboats are 'co-crewed', meaning that the operator and engineer are full-time personnel while the crew members are trained volunteers.

== Types of craft ==
Rescue boats designed for rescue and recovery from low head dams

=== Inflatable boats (IB, RIB and RHIB) ===
Older inflatable boats, such as those introduced by the Royal National Lifeboat Institution (RNLI) and Atlantic College in 1963, were soon made larger and those over 3 metres (9.8 ft) often had plywood bottoms and were known as RIBs. These two types were superseded by newer types of RIBs which had purpose built hulls and flotation tubes. A gap in operations caused the New Zealand Lifeguard Service to reintroduce small 2 man IRB's, which have since been adopted by other organisations such as the RNLI as well.

=== Lifeboats ===
Larger non-inflatable boats are also employed as lifeboats. The RNLI fields the Severn class lifeboat and Tamar class lifeboat as all-weather lifeboats (ALB). In the United States and Canada, the term motor life boat (MLB) refers to a similar class of non-inflatable self-righting lifeboats, such as the 47-foot Motor Lifeboat. In France, the SNSM mainly equips all-weather lifeboats of the 17.6 m series of the "Patron Jack Morisseau" class.

In 2022, the Canadian Coast Guard launched 62’ / 19m Bay Class Lifeboat based on hull form and topsides style of the shorter RNLI Severn Class All-weather Life-Boat (ALB) designed by Robert Allan RAL naval architects of Vancouver.

== History ==
=== China ===
The first recorded rescue attempt by boat is noted in the Record of the Grand Historian, Sima Qian, of the second century AD. It was the unsuccessful attempt to rescue Qu Yuan from drowning in the Miluo River (Hunan Province) by local fishermen. This humanitarian act has ever since been re-enacted in the 2,000 year old annual dragon boat festival, which is a UNESCO-designated intangible cultural heritage of the world.

A regular lifeboat service operated from 1854 to 1940 along the middle reaches of the Chang jiang or Yangtze, a major river which flows through south central China. These waters are particularly treacherous to waterway travellers owing to the canyon-like gorge conditions along the river shore and the high volume and rate of flow. The 'long river' was a principal means of communication between coastal (Shanghai) and interior China (Chongqing, once known as Chungking).

These river lifeboats, usually painted red, were of a wooden pulling boat design, with a very narrow length-to-beam ratio and a shallow draft for negotiating shoal waters and turbulent rock-strewn currents. They could thus be maneuvered sideways to negotiate rocks, similar to today's inflated rafts for 'running' fast rivers, and also could be hauled upstream by human haulers, rather than beasts of burden, who walked along narrow catwalks lining the canyon sides.

=== United Kingdom ===
The first lifeboat station in Britain was at Formby beach, established in 1776 by William Hutchinson, Dock Master for the Liverpool Common Council.

The first non-submersible ('unimmergible') lifeboat is credited to Lionel Lukin, an Englishman who, in 1784, modified and patented a 20-foot (6.1 m) Norwegian yawl, fitting it with water-tight cork-filled chambers for additional buoyancy and a cast iron keel to keep the boat upright.

The first boat specialised as a lifeboat was tested on the River Tyne in England on January 29, 1790, built by Henry Greathead. The design won a competition organised by the private Law House committee, though William Wouldhave and Lionel Lukin both claimed to be the inventor of the first lifeboat. Greathead's boat, the Original (combined with some features of Wouldhave's) entered service in 1790 and another 31 of the same design were constructed. The 28 feet (8.5 m) boat was rowed by up to 12 crew for whom cork jackets were provided. In 1807 Ludkin designed the Frances Ann for the Lowestoft service, which wasn't satisfied with Greathead's design, and this saved 300 lives over 42 years of service.

The first self-righting design was developed by William Wouldhave and also entered in the Law House competition, but was only awarded a half-prize. Self-righting designs were not deployed until the 1840s.

These lifeboats were crewed by 6 to 10 volunteers who would row out from shore when a ship was in distress. In the case of the UK the crews were generally local boatmen. One example of this was the Newhaven Lifeboat, established in 1803 in response to the wrecking of HMS Brazen in January 1800, when only one of her crew of 105 could be saved. The UK combined many of these local efforts into a national organisation in 1824 with the establishment of the Royal National Lifeboat Institution. One example of an early lifeboat was the Landguard Fort Lifeboat of 1821, designed by Richard Hall Gower.

In 1851, James Beeching and James Peake produced the design for the Beeching–Peake SR (self-righting) lifeboat which became the standard model for the new Royal National Lifeboat Institution fleet.

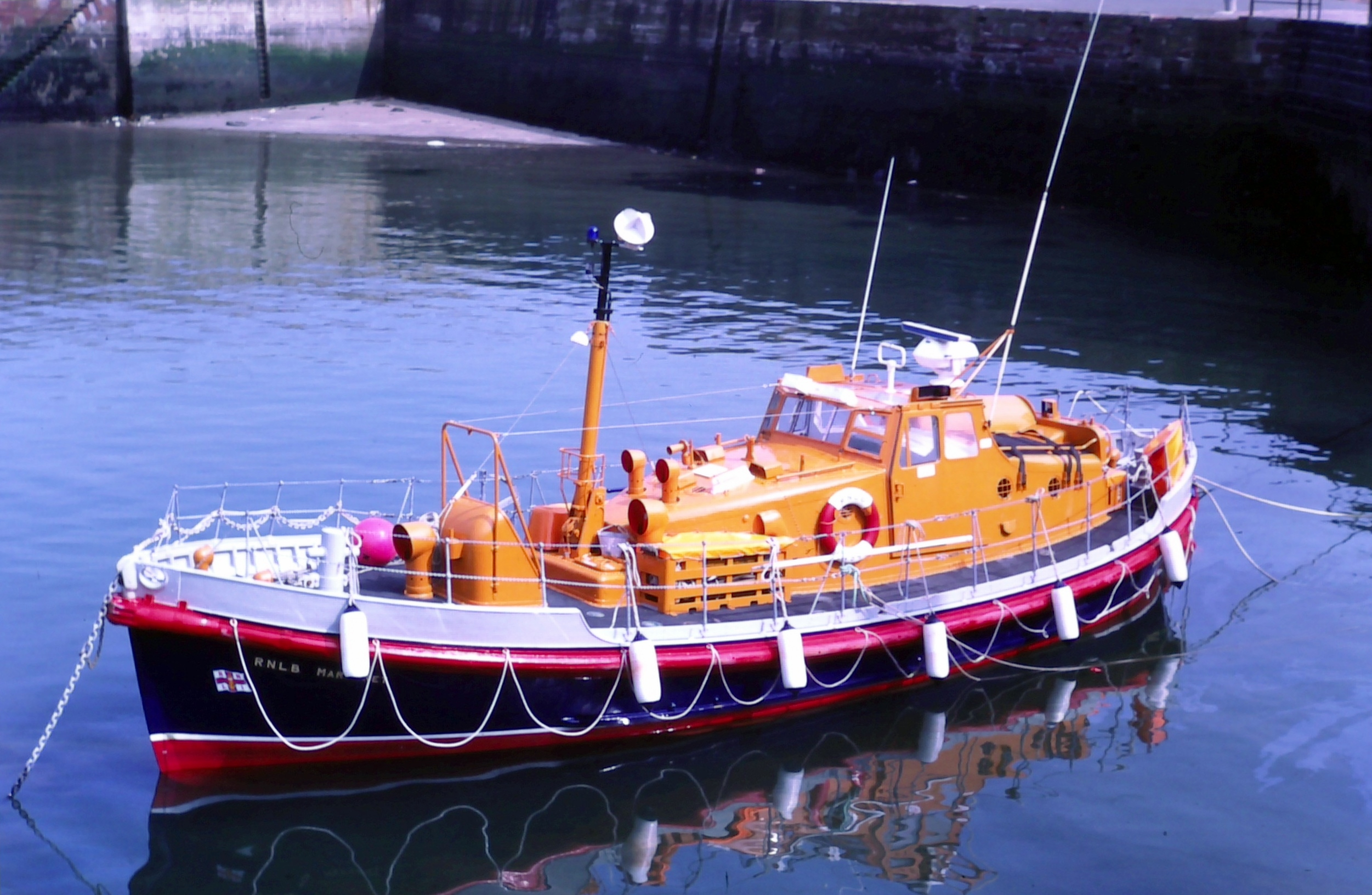
RNLI lifeboat in Dunbar Harbour, 1981

The first motorised boat, the Duke of Northumberland, was built in 1890 and was steam powered. In 1929 the motorised lifeboat Princess Mary was commissioned and was the largest oceangoing lifeboat at that time, able to carry over 300 persons on rescue missions. The Princess Mary was stationed at Padstow in Cornwall, England.

=== United States ===
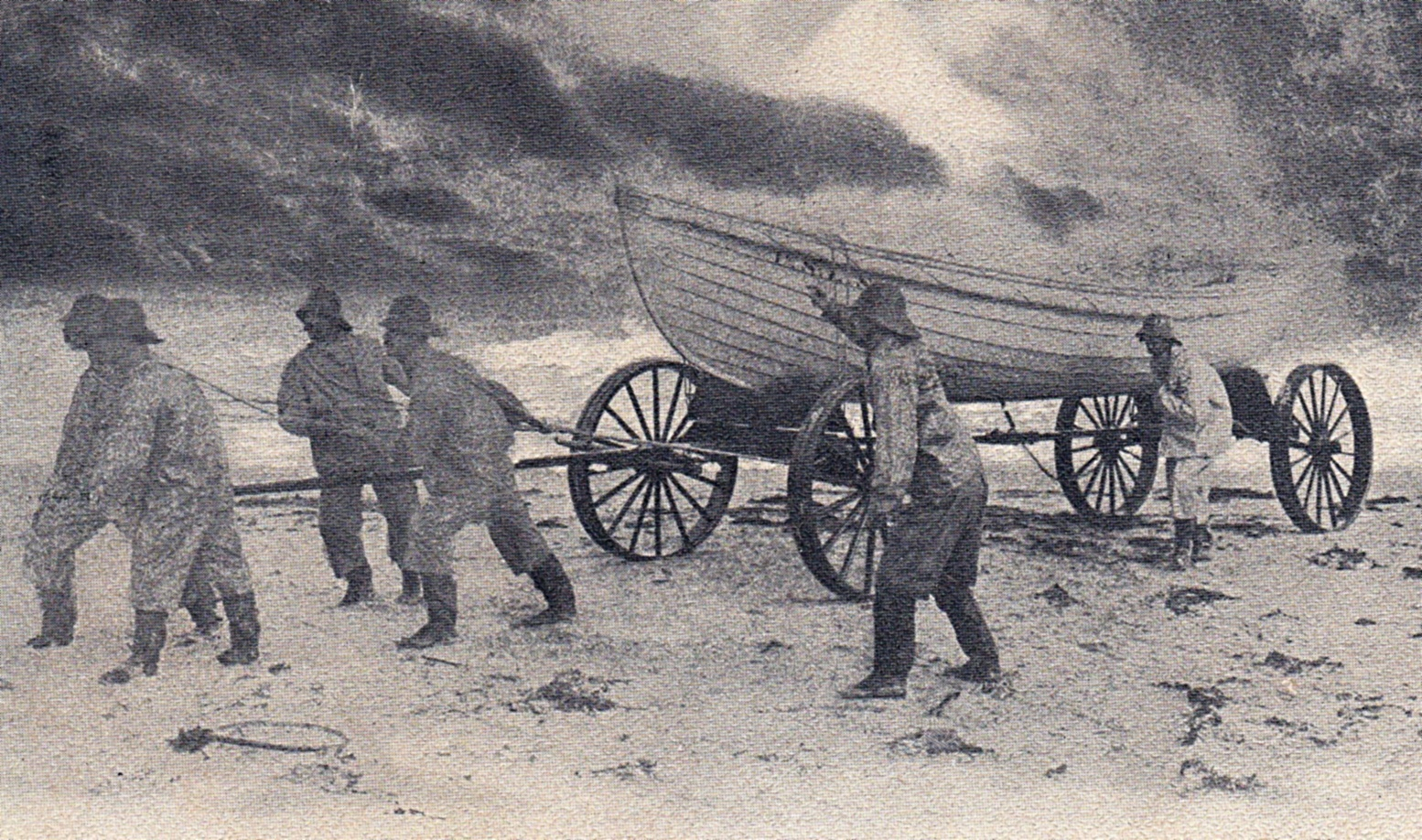
1906 postcard captioned, The start of the life-boat, Cape Cod

The United States Life Saving Service (USLSS) was established in 1848. This was a United States government agency that grew out of private and local humanitarian efforts to save the lives of shipwrecked mariners and passengers. In 1915 the USLSS merged with the Revenue Cutter Service to form the United States Coast Guard (USCG).

In 1899 the Lake Shore Engine Company, at the behest of the Marquette Life Saving Station, fitted a two-cylinder 12 hp (8.9 kW) engine to a 34-foot (10 m) lifeboat on Lake Superior, Michigan. Its operation marked the introduction of the term motor life boat (MLB). By 1909, 44 boats had been fitted with engines whose power had increased to 40 hp (30 kW).

The sailors of the MLBs are called "surfmen", after the name given to the volunteers of the original USLSS. The main school for training USCG surfmen is the National Motor Lifeboat School (NMLBS) located at the Coast Guard Station Cape Disappointment at the mouth of the Columbia River, which is also the boundary separating Washington State from Oregon State. The sand bars which form at the entrance are treacherous and provide a tough training environment for surf lifesavers.

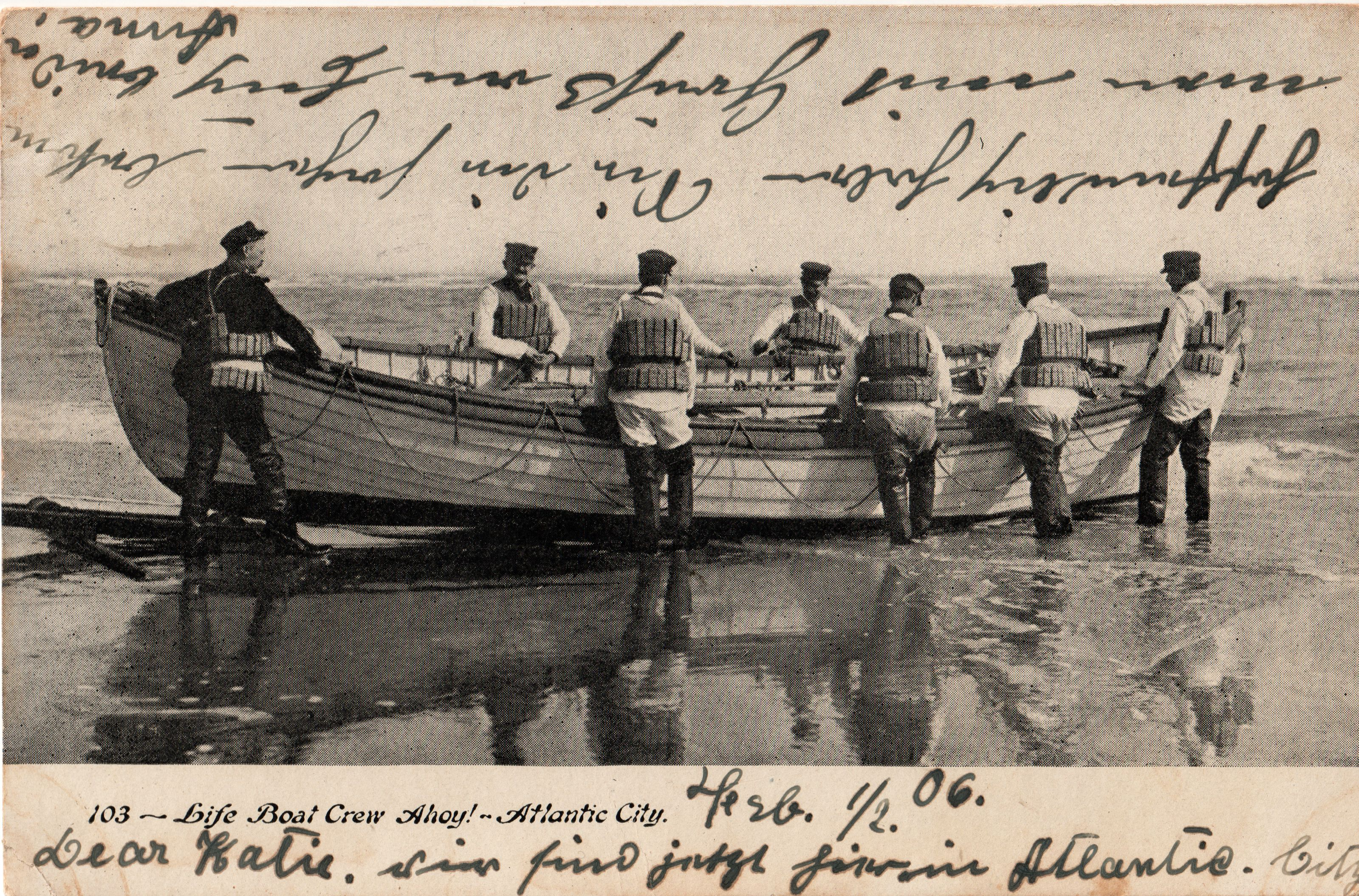
Lifeboat crew and boat, Atlantic City, New Jersey, about 1906

=== Canada ===
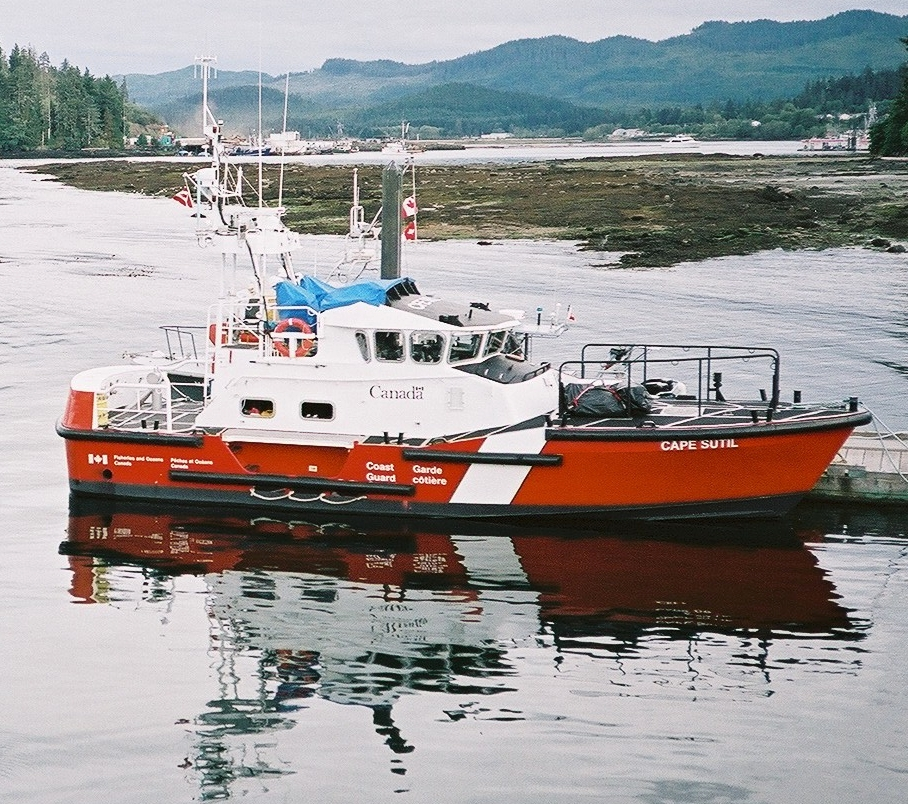
CCGS Cape Sutil, a 14.6 metres (48 ft) motor life boat

Canada established its first lifeboat stations in the mid-to-late 19th century along the Atlantic and Pacific coasts, as well as along the shores of the Canadian side of the Great Lakes. The original organisation was called the "Canadian Lifesaving Service", not to be confused with the Royal Life Saving Society of Canada, which came later at the turn of the 20th century.

In 1908, Canada had the first lifeboat (a pulling sailing boat design) to be equipped with a motor in North America, at Bamfield, British Columbia.

=== France ===
The Société Nationale de Sauvetage en Mer (SNSM) is a French voluntary organisation founded in 1967 by merging the Société Centrale de Sauvetage des Naufragés (founded in 1865) and the Hospitaliers Sauveteurs Bretons (1873). Its task is saving lives at sea around the French coast, including the overseas départments and territories.

== Modern lifeboats ==
Lifeboats have been modified by the addition of an engine since 1890 which provides more power to get in and out of the swell area inside the surf. They can be launched from shore in any weather and perform rescues further out. Older lifeboats relied on sails and oars which are slower and dependent on wind conditions or manpower. Modern lifeboats generally have electronic devices such as radios and radar to help locate the party in distress and carry medical and food supplies for the survivors.

The Rigid Hulled Inflatable Boat (RHIB) is now seen as the best type of craft for in-shore rescues as they are less likely to be tipped over by the wind or breakers. Specially designed jet rescue boats have also been used successfully. Unlike ordinary pleasure craft these small to medium-sized rescue craft often have a very low freeboard so that victims can be taken aboard without lifting. This means that the boats are designed to operate with water inside the boat hull and rely on flotation tanks rather than hull displacement to stay afloat and upright.

Inflatables (IB)s fell out of general use after the introduction of RIBs during the 1970s. Conditions in New Zealand and other large surf zones was identified and Inflatable Rescue Boats (IRB), small non rigid powered boats, were introduced by New Zealand at Piha Beach and have been put into use in many other countries including Australia and the RNLI in the UK.

=== Australasia ===
In Australasia surf lifesaving clubs operate inflatable rescue boats (IRB) for in-shore rescues of swimmers and surfers. These boats are best typified by the rubber Zodiac and are powered by a 25-horsepower outboard motor. In the off season, these boats are used in competitive rescue racing. In addition to this, most states have a power craft rescue service. RWCs (Rescue Water Craft, Jetski) are common to many beaches, providing lifesaving service. The state of New South Wales operates dual hull fiberglass offshore boats, while Queensland, Tasmania and South Australia operate aluminum hull Jet Rescue Boats, of about 6m in length. Some regions such as North Queensland and the Northern Territory operate RNLI style rigid hull inflatables.

In Auckland, New Zealand two 15-foot surf jet rescue boat powered by three stage Hamilton jet units were stationed in the 1970s and 1980s at Piha Beach the home of the Piha Surf Life Saving Club.

=== Canada ===
The Canadian Coast Guard operates makes and models of motor lifeboats that are modified RNLI and USCG designs such as the Arun and the 47 footer (respectively).

=== France ===
The SNSM operates over 500 boats crewed by more than 3200 volunteers, from all-weather lifeboats to jetskis, dispersed in 218 stations (including 15 in overseas territories). In 2009 the SNSM was responsible for about half of all sea rescue operations and saved 5,400 lives in 2816 call-outs and assisted 2140 boats in distress. The service has 41 all-weather rescue boats, 34 first-class rescue boats, 76 second-class lifeboats and 20 light rescue boats (and an amphibious rescue boat), and many inflatable boats. All these boats are made unsinkable by injection into the hull of very light materials (closed cell polyurethane foam) : with these buoyancy reserves, the boat itself full of water always remains in positive buoyancy; they also have a tight sealed compartment. All-weather lifeboats from 15 meters to 18 meters are self-righting. The first class lifeboat have capacities close to the all-weather rescue boats, the second class lifeboat are intended for slightly less difficult conditions. The first and second class boats, respectively 14 meters and 12 meters, which are the most recent boats, are self-righting. The boats are dispersed in 185 stations (including 15 in overseas territories).

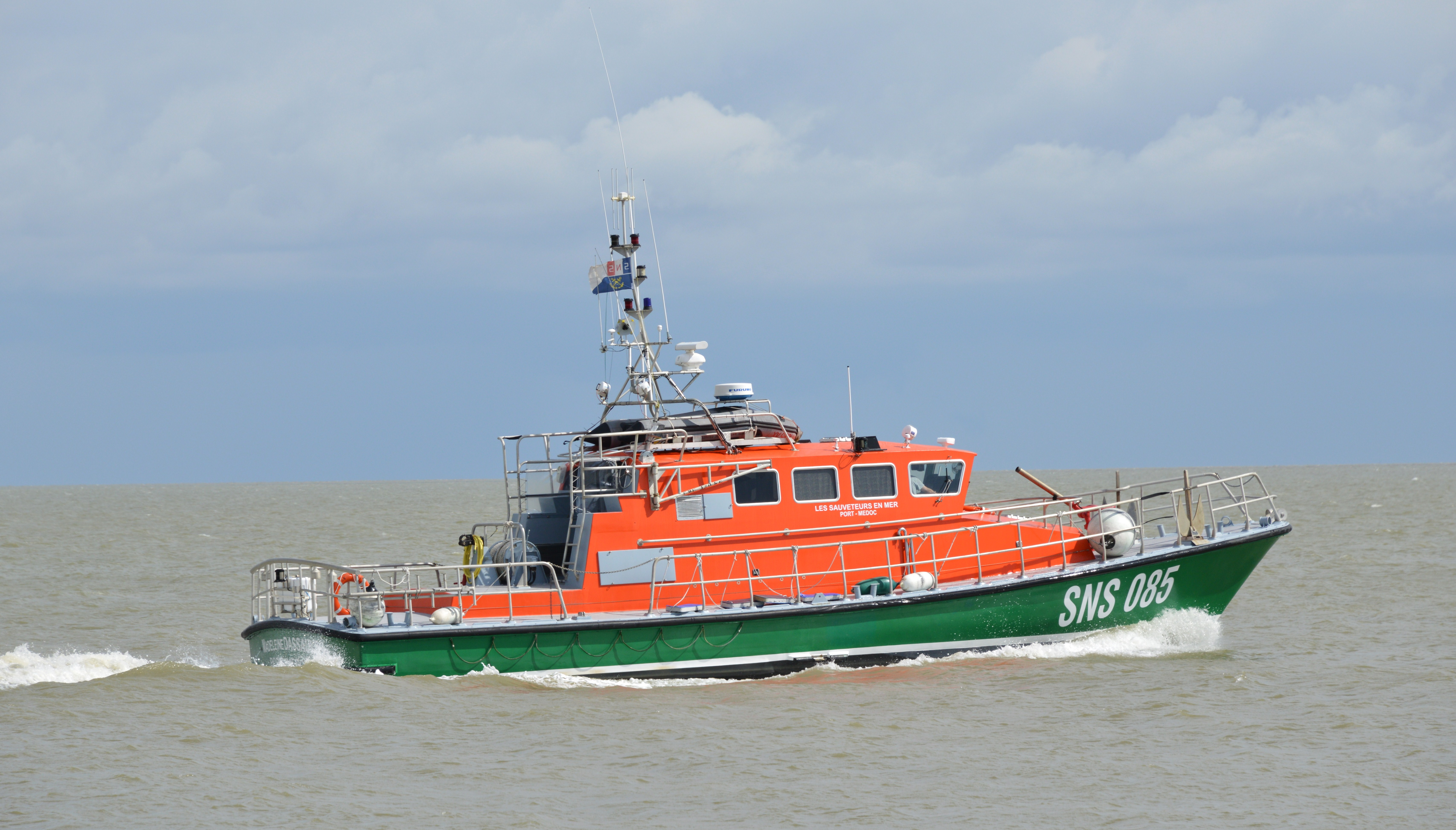
An all-weather lifeboat from the SNSM. This is the largest class of French lifeboat, at 18 metres long. The association owns 41 all-weather rescue boats, there are 30 of this type, the others being all-weather rescue boats of the 15.50 m class and the new generation all-weather rescue boats (CTT NG).

=== Germany ===
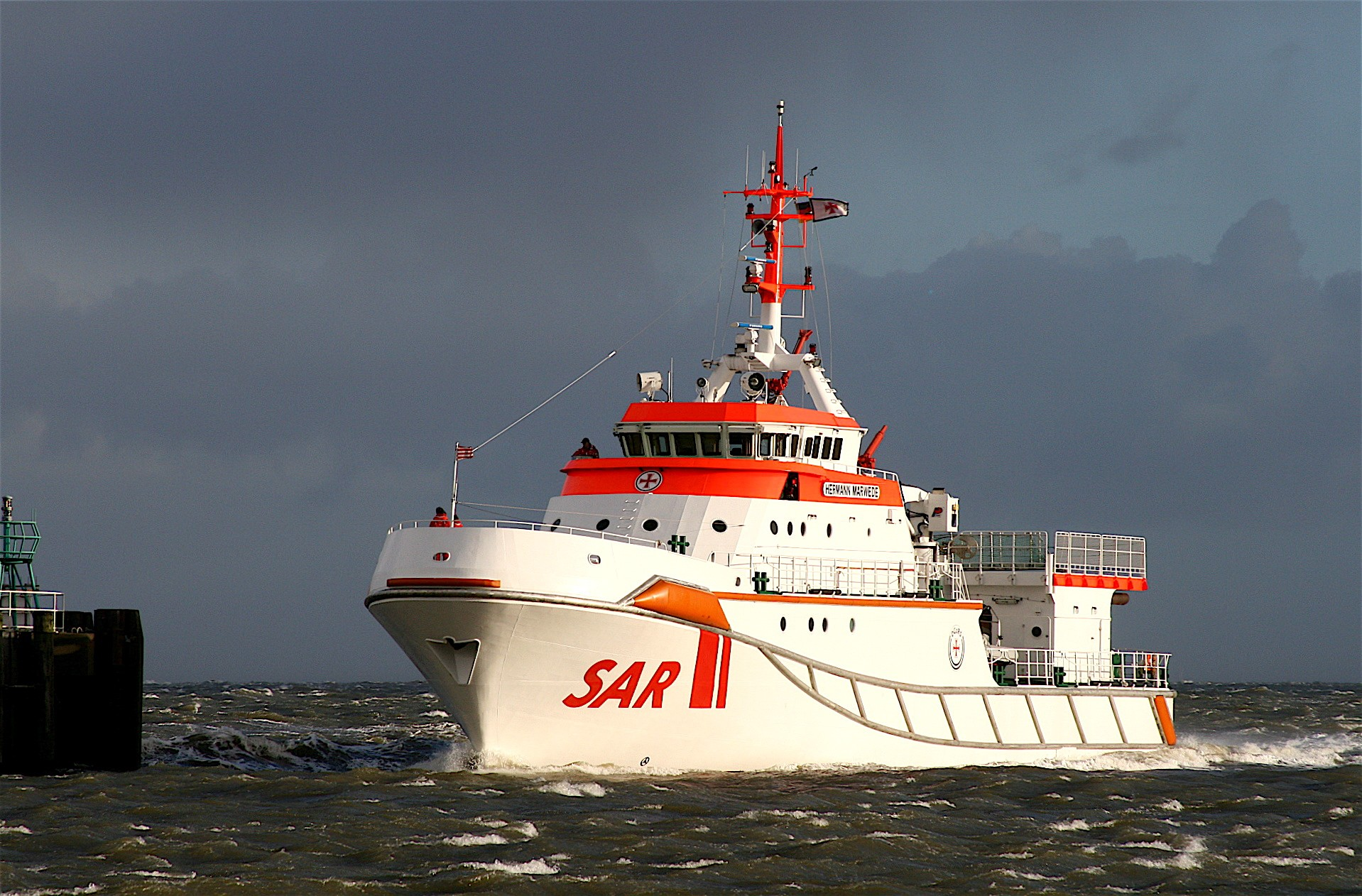
German lifeboat SK Hermann Marwede of the German Maritime Search and Rescue Service (DGzRS)

In Germany, the German Maritime Search and Rescue Service (DGzRS) has provided naval rescue service since 1865. It is a civilian, non-profit organisation which relies entirely on individual funding (no government support) and has a variety of boats and ships, the biggest being the 46 meters (151 feet) Hermann Marwede with 400 tons displacement, the largest lifeboat in the world, operating from the island of Helgoland. The DGzRS operates from 54 stations in the North Sea and the Baltic Sea. It has 20 rescue cruisers (usually piggybacking a smaller rescue boat), mostly operated by own full-time personnel and 40 rescue boats operated by volunteers. Voluntary organisations such as the German Red Cross (Wasserwacht) and DLRG provide lifeguarding and emergency response for rivers, lakes, coasts and such like.

=== Netherlands ===
The Dutch lifeboat association Koninklijke Nederlandse Redding Maatschappij (KNRM) has developed jet-driven RIB lifeboats. This has resulted in 3 classes, the largest is the Arie Visser class: length 18,80 m, twin jet, 2 x 1,000 hp (750 kW), max. speed 35 knots (65 km/h), capacity 120 persons. Some local lifeguard organisations also respond on the SAR.

=== Scandinavia ===
Most Scandinavian countries also have volunteer lifeboat societies.

=== UK and Ireland ===
==== Royal National Lifeboat Institution ====
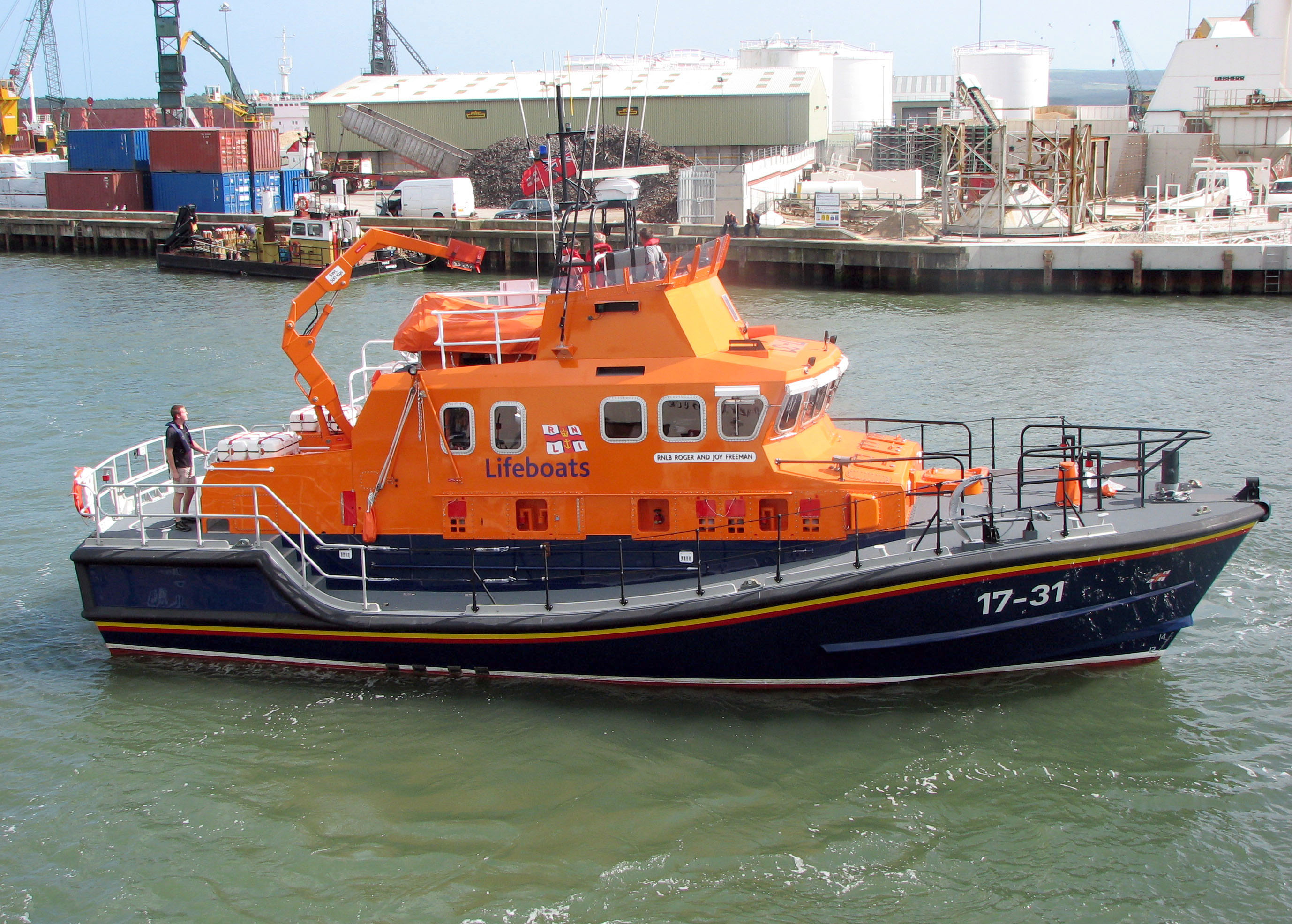
Severn class lifeboat in Poole Harbour, Dorset, England. This is the largest class of UK lifeboat, at 17 metres long.

The Royal National Lifeboat Institution (or RNLI) maintains lifeboats around the coasts of Great Britain and Ireland crewed largely by unpaid volunteers, most part-time, with equipment funded through voluntary donations.

In Britain, the RNLI design and build several types of all-weather motor lifeboats, the Arun class kept permanently afloat, the Tyne class slipway-launched boat and the Mersey class carriage-launched boat. More recently the Arun replacement Trent and Severn class prototype models were delivered in 1992 with the first production Trent arriving in 1994 and the Severn in 1996. The first production Tamar class, replacement for the Tyne went into service in December 2005 and the FCB2 class replacement for the Mersey is being developed for deployment sometime in 2013. The FCB2 class of lifeboat was on 11 April 2011 accepted as a proven design and given the class name Shannon, continuing the RNLI tradition of naming all-weather lifeboat classes after rivers in the British Isles. Scarborough lifeboat station in North Yorkshire and Hoylake lifeboat station on the Wirral are two of the first stations to be allocated one of the new boats. Scarborough's Shannon class lifeboat will be named Frederick William Plaxton in his memory as he left a substantial legacy to the RNLI specifically to purchase Scarborough's next all-weather lifeboat.

==== Independent services ====
There are at least 70 lifeboat services in Britain and Ireland that are independent of the RNLI, providing lifeboats and crews 24 hours a day all year round, consisting of unpaid volunteers. They operate inland, inshore or offshore, according to local needs.

=== United States ===
The United States Life Saving Service began using motorised lifeboats in 1899. Models derived from this hull design remained in use until 1987.

Today in U.S. waters rescue-at-sea is part of the duties of the United States Coast Guard. The coast guard's MLBs, an integral part of the USCG's fleet, are built to withstand the most severe conditions at sea. Designed to be self-bailing, self-righting and practically unsinkable, MLBs are used for surf rescue in heavy weather.

==== 36' (foot), 1929–1987 ====
The 36-foot (11 m) Type "T" model was introduced in 1929 with a two-ton lead keel, powered by a 90 hp (67 kW) Sterling gas engine, giving a top speed of nine knots (17 km/h). Minor updates followed in 1931 (Type "TR") and 1937 (Type "TRS"). From the early days of the 20th century the 36 MLB was the mainstay of coastal rescue operations for over 30 years until the 44 MLB was introduced in 1962.

Built at the Coast Guard Yard in Curtis Bay, Maryland, 218 36 T, TR and TRS MLBs were built between 1929 and 1956. Based on a hull design from the 1880s, the 36 TRS and her predecessors remain the longest active hull design in the Coast Guard, serving the Coast Guard and the Life Saving Services for almost 100 years, the last one, CG-36535, serving Depoe Bay MLB Station in Oregon until 1987.

==== 52' (foot), 1935–1967; 1956–2021 ====
In the mid-1930s the USCG ordered two 52-foot wooden-hulled motor lifeboats (MLBs) for service where there was a high traffic of merchants ships and heavy seas that had a high capacity in the number of person that could be rescued of approximately 100 and could tow ten fully loaded standard life boats used by most merchant vessels. Unlike the older 36-foot, the 52-foot MLBs had a diesel engine.

The 52-foot wooden-hulled MLBs were the only Coast Guard vessels less than 65 feet (20 m) in length that were given names, CG-52300 Invincible and CG-52301 Triumph. Both were built at the United States Coast Guard Yard; Invincible was initially assigned to Station Sandy Hook, New Jersey, and Triumph was assigned to Station Point Adams in Oregon. In time Invincible was also transferred to the Pacific Northwest at Station Grays Harbor. Triumph later capsized and sank during a rescue mission on January 12, 1961.

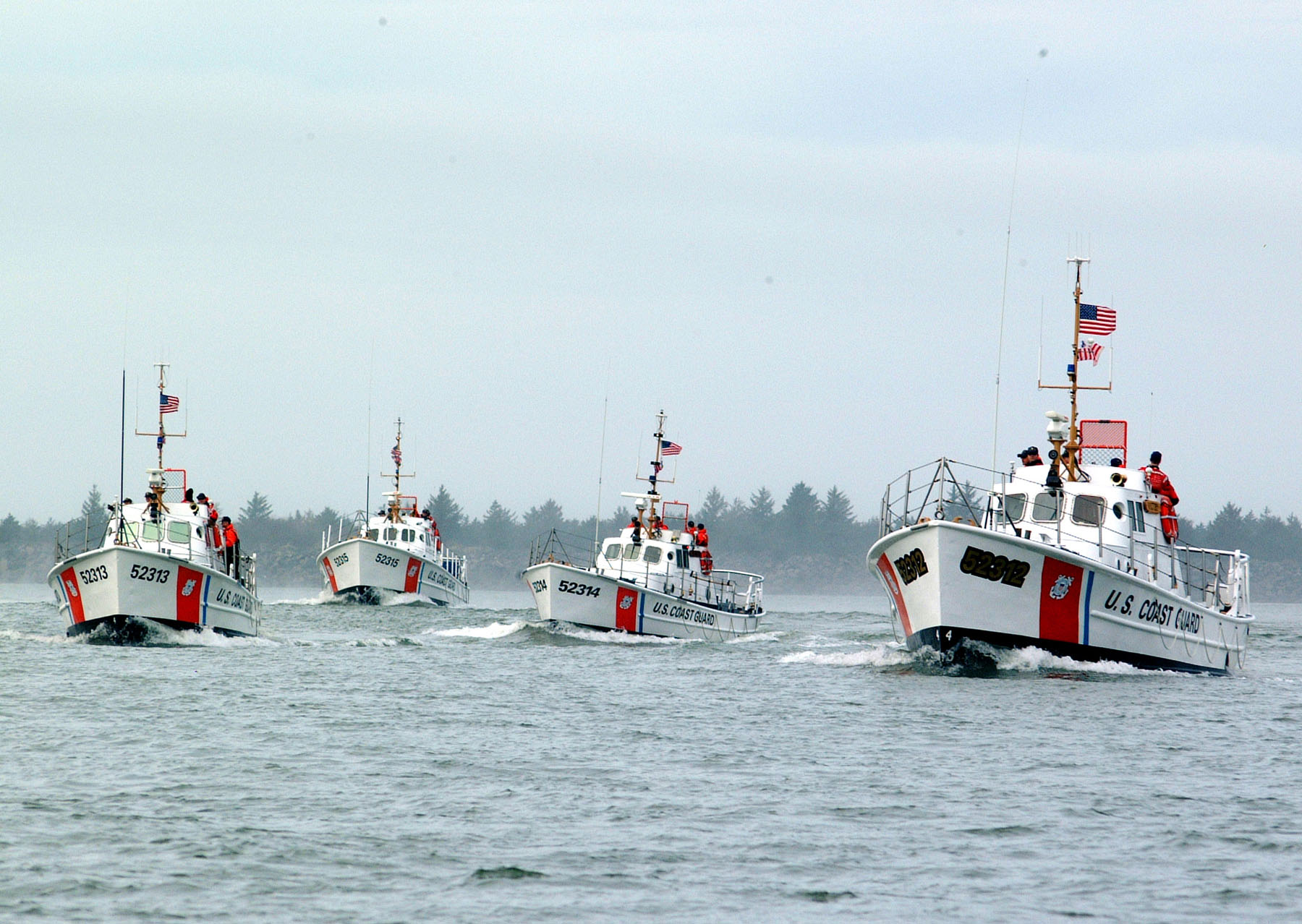
All four steel-hull 52' MLBs (2003)

The Coast Guard introduced a steel-hulled successor, the 52-foot Motor Lifeboats, in 1956, and completed four steel 52' MLBs by 1961. These 52' MLBs also are known as "Special Purpose Craft – Heavy Weather" (SPC-HWX); maintaining precedent, these were named: Victory (CG-52312), Invincible II (CG-52313), Triumph II (CG-52314), and Intrepid (CG-52315). All four were stationed in the Pacific Northwest and remained active until 2021, when they were laid up as they had become too expensive to maintain.

In December 2024, the Coast Guard released a request for proposal and environmental assessment report for a proposed replacement, the "Special Purpose Craft – Heavy Weather Second Generation" (SPC-HWX II) program. The preliminary design measures 64 ft (20 m) in overall length with a maximum beam of 22 ft (6.7 m), capable of operating in seas of up to 35 ft (11 m), breaking waves of 25 ft (7.6 m), and winds up to 60 kn (110 km/h; 69 mph).

==== 44' (foot) ====
During the 1960s the Coast Guard replaced the 36-foot (11 m) MLB with the newly designed 44-foot (13 m) boat. These steel-hulled boats were more capable and more complicated than the wooden lifeboats they replaced.

In all 110 vessels would be built by the Coast Guard Yard in Curtis Bay between 1962 and 1972 with an additional 52 built by the RNLI, Canadian Coast Guard and others under licence from the USCG.

The last active 44' MLB in the United States Coast Guard was retired in May 2009, however these boats are still in active service elsewhere around the globe. The 44' MLB can be found in many third world countries and is faithfully serving the Royal Volunteer Coastal Patrol in Australia and the Royal New Zealand Coastguard Federation. The current engine configuration is twin Detroit Diesel 6v53s that put out 185 hp (138 kW) each at a max RPM of 2800.

==== 30' (foot) surf rescue boat ====
Another surf capable boat that the Coast Guard has used in recent years is the 30' surf rescue boat (SRB) introduced in 1983. The 30' SRB was self-righting and self bailing and designed with marked differences from the typical lifeboats used by the Coast Guard up until the early 1980s. The 30' SRB is not considered to be an MLB, but was generally used in a similar capacity. Designed to perform search and rescue in adverse weather the vessel is generally operated with a crew of two, a surfman and an engineer. The crew both stand on the coxswain flat, protected by the superstructure on the bow and stern. The boat's appearance has caused many to comment that it looks like a "Nike Tennis Shoe".

Since 1997 the introduction of the faster 47' MLB and the phasing out of the 44' MLBs made the 30 footers obsolete. The class of vessels underwent an overhaul in the early nineties to extend their life until the newer and faster 47' motor lifeboats came into service, and in the late 1990s most of the 30 footers were de-commissioned. One still remains on active duty at Motor Lifeboat Station Depoe Bay in Depoe Bay, Oregon and is used almost daily. This station was host to the last 36' motor lifeboat in the late 1980s.

==== 47' (foot) ====
The USCG has since designed and built new aluminum 47-foot (14 m) lifeboats and the first production boat was delivered to the USCG in 1997.

The 47-Foot Motor Lifeboat is able to withstand impacts of three times the acceleration of gravity, can survive a complete roll-over and is self-righting in less than 10 seconds with all machinery and instruments remaining fully operational. The 47' MLB can travel at 25 knots (46 km/h) to reach her destination.

There are 117 operational with a total of 200 scheduled to be delivered to the USCG. A further 27 models are being built by MetalCraft Marine under licence to the Canadian Coast Guard.

==== Response Boat – Medium ====
The Response Boat – Medium is a replacement for the 41-foot Utility Boat, Large and the USCG plans a fleet of 180 in the USA.

=== Gallery ===
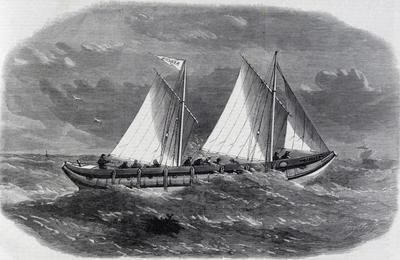
An 1863 tubular lifeboat from New Brighton

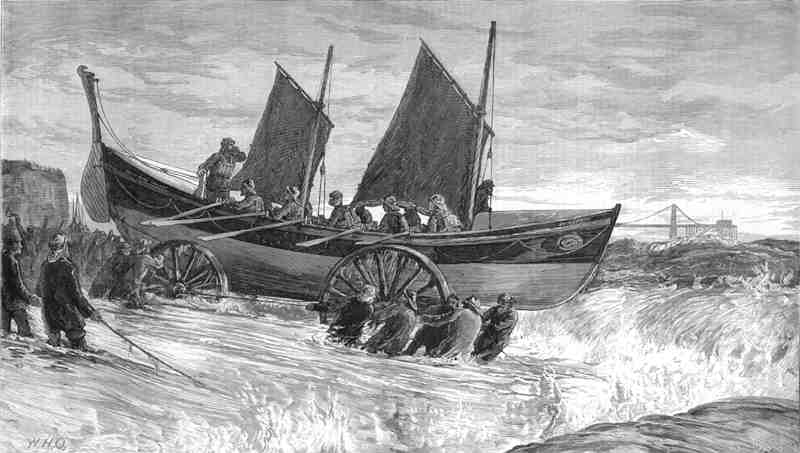
Launching the lifeboat at Brighton, Sussex in 1875

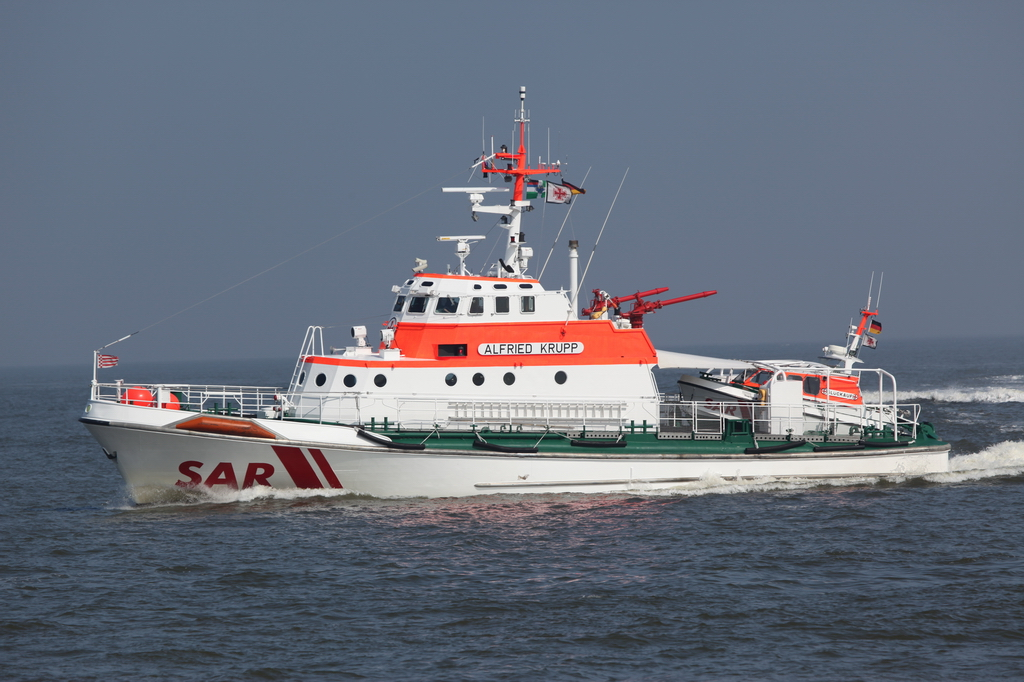
SK Alfried Krupp, a 27.5 m/89 ft — class lifeboat of the German DGzRS with daughter boat

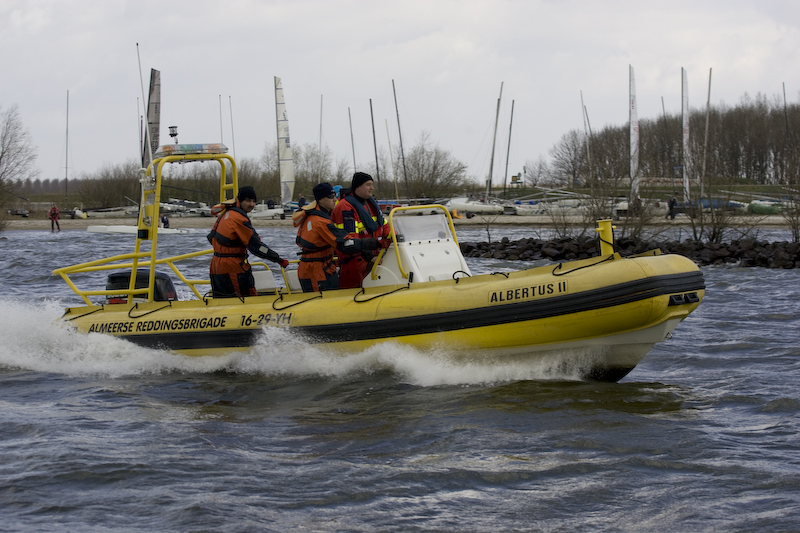
Dutch local lifeguards responding to a SAR call

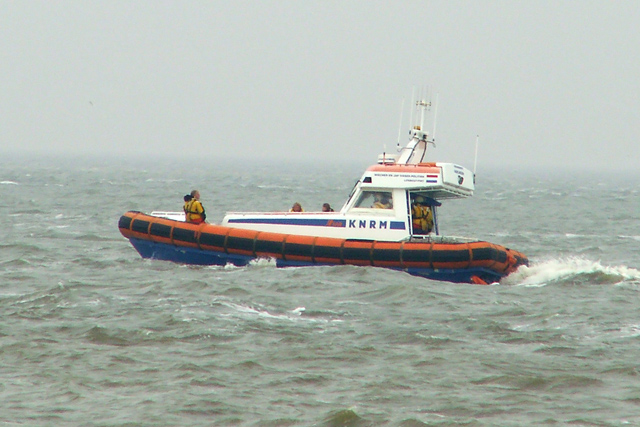
The Wiecher en Jap Visser-Politiek, Dutch RIB lifeboat

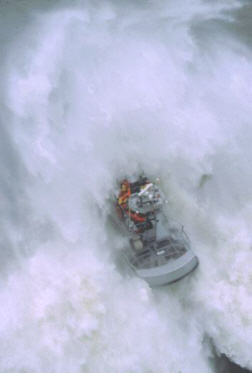
A 47-foot MLB of the US coast guard

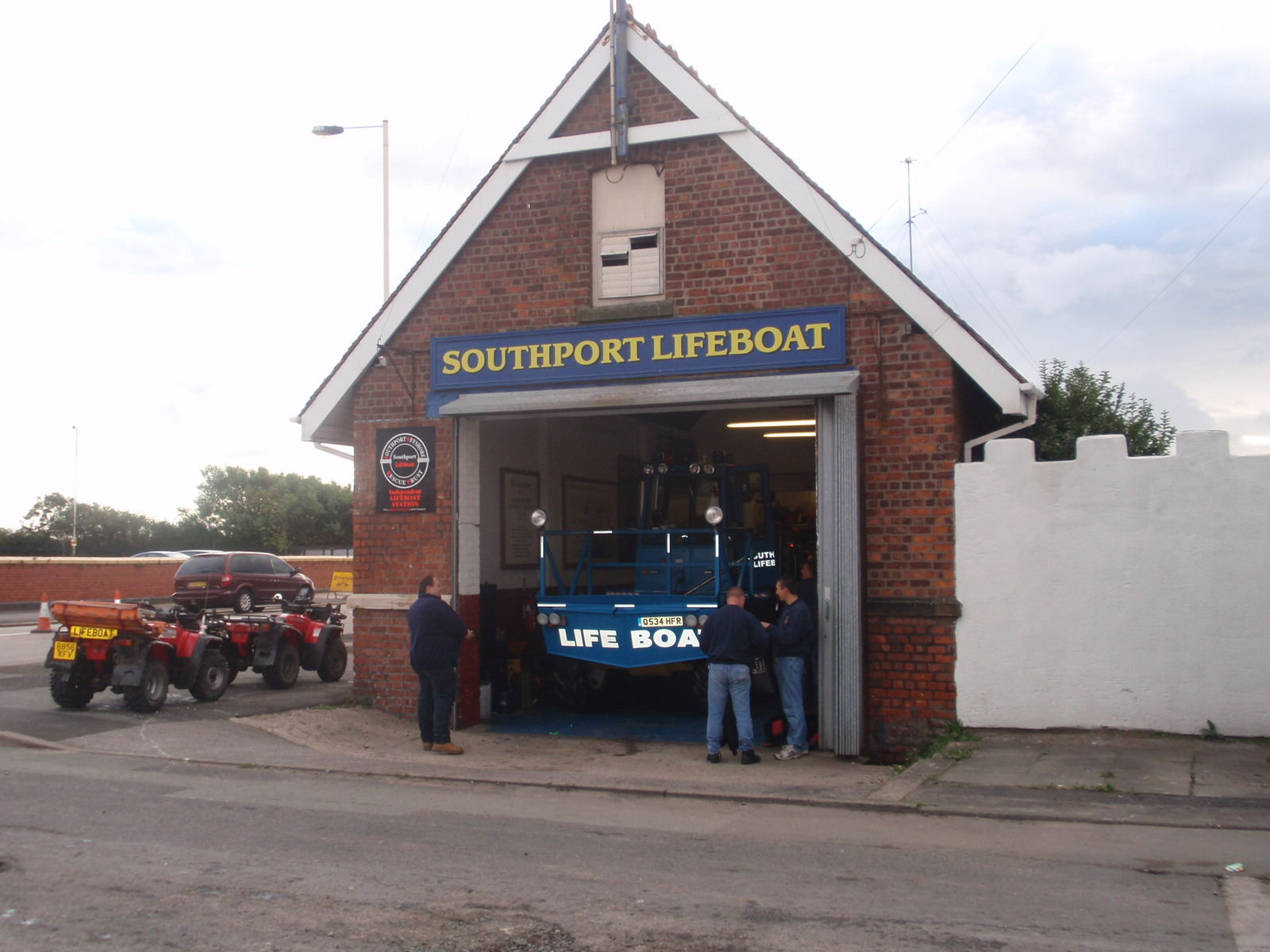
Southport lifeboat station, England

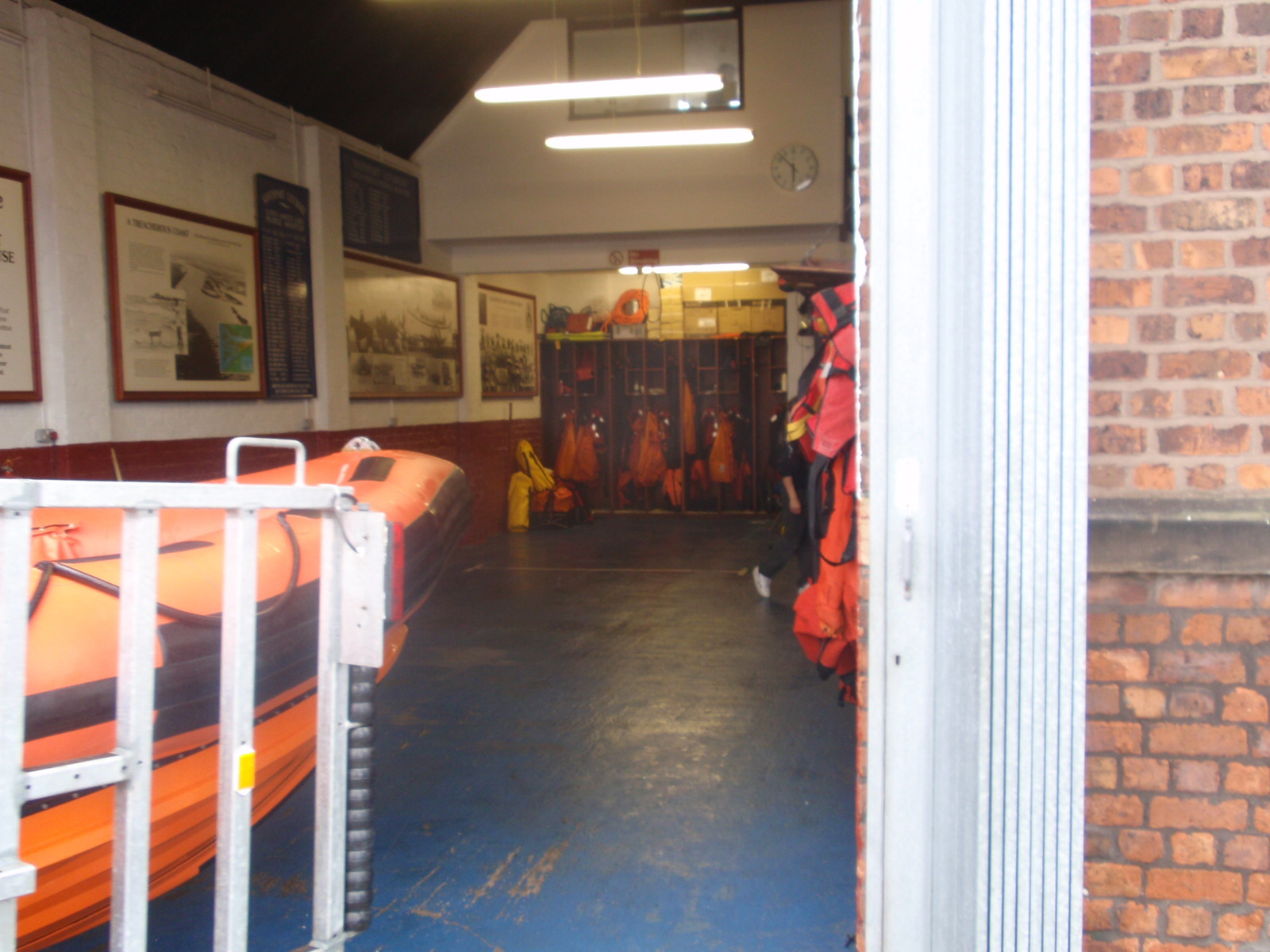
Inside Southport lifeboat station, England

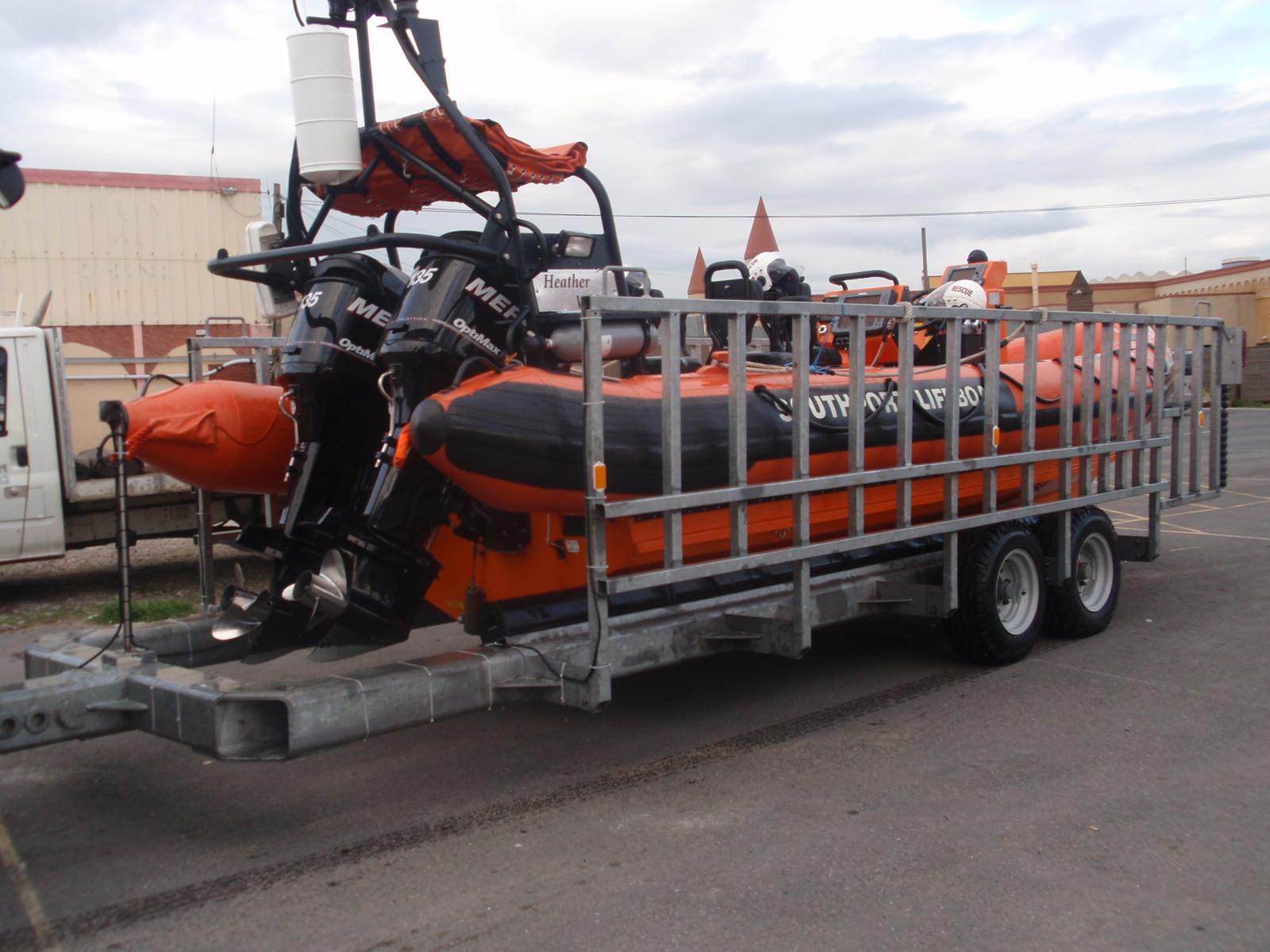
Southport inshore rescue boat on trailer

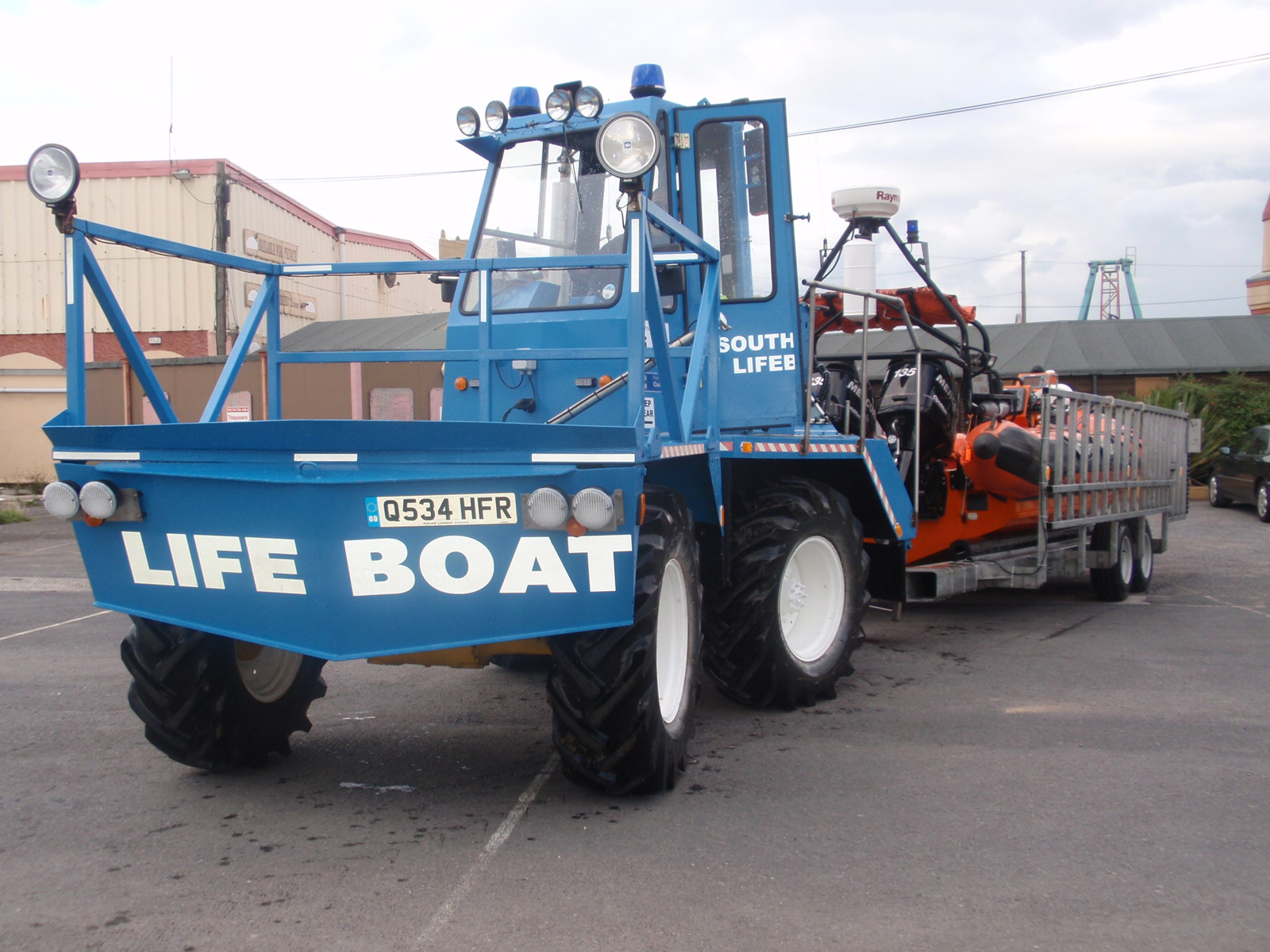
Southport inshore rescue boat on trailer showing special tractor which steers with an articulated front end, which is somewhat wedge-shaped to push obstructions aside

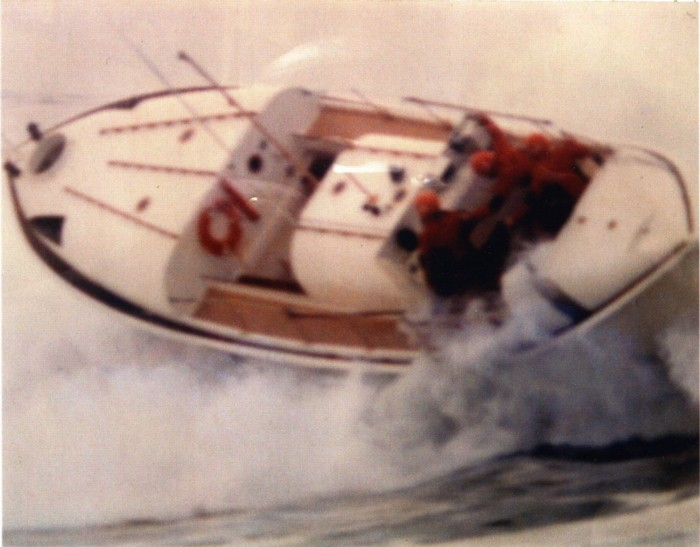
US Coast Guard Motor Life Boat CG-36535 off Nehalem River MLB Station, c. 1975

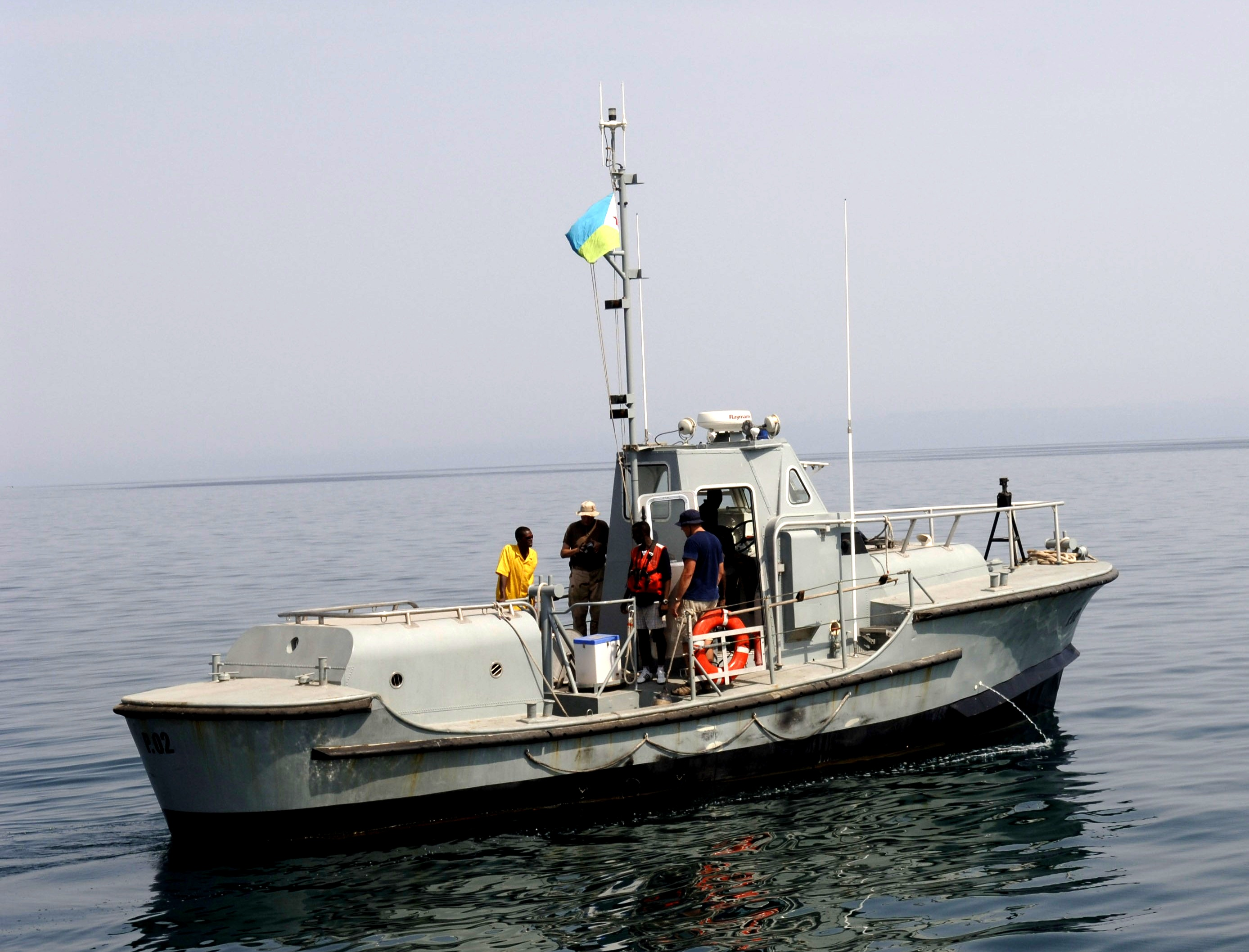
One of four refurbished 44-foot patrol boats supplied to the Djibouti Navy

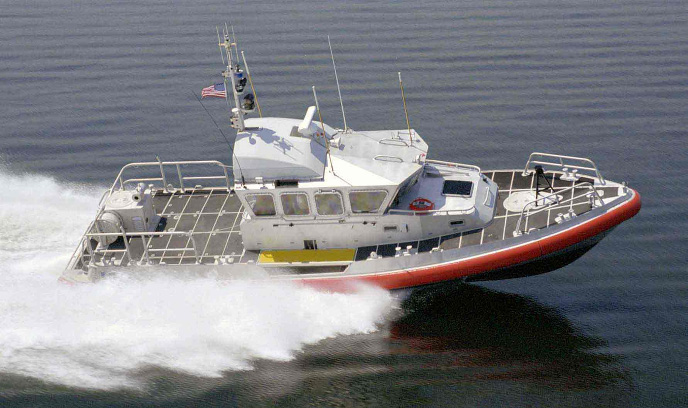
A USCG Response Boat – Medium

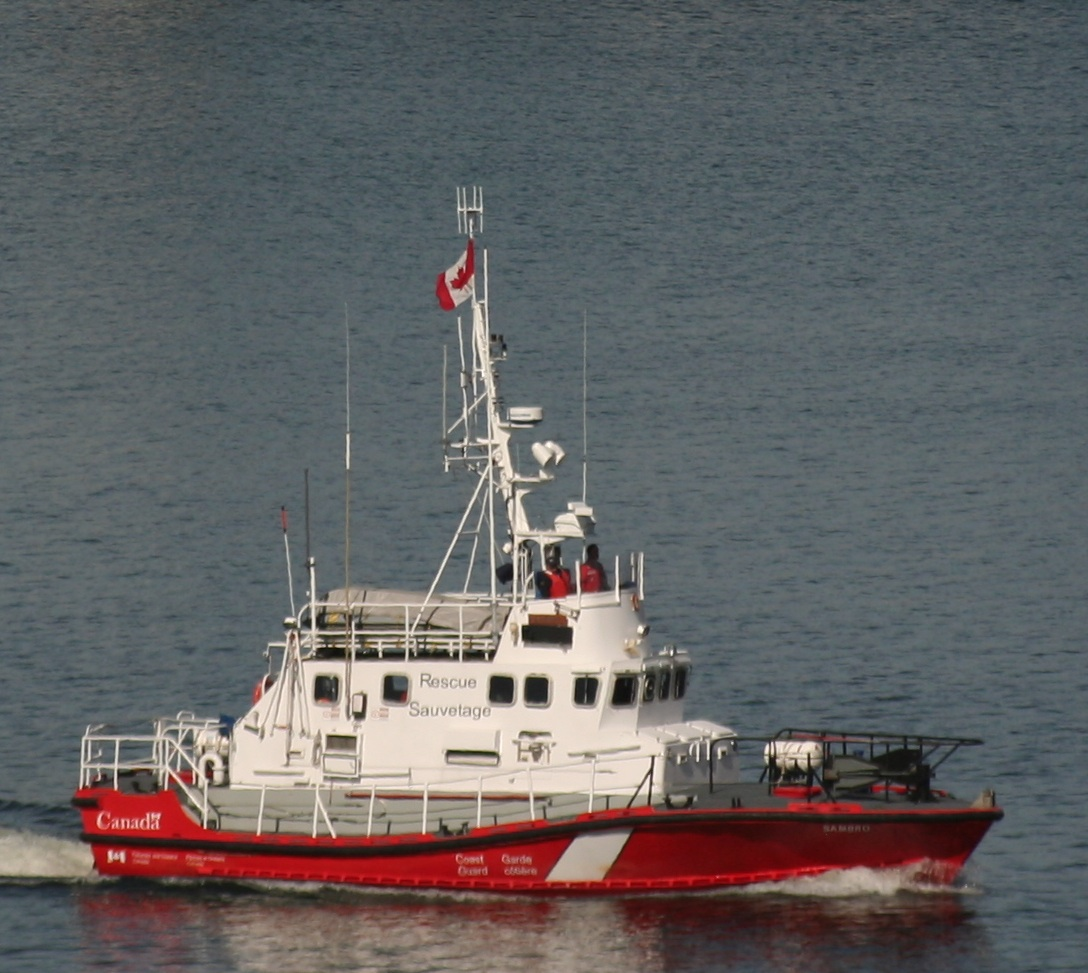
Canadian Coast Guard Arun class medium endurance motor lifeboat

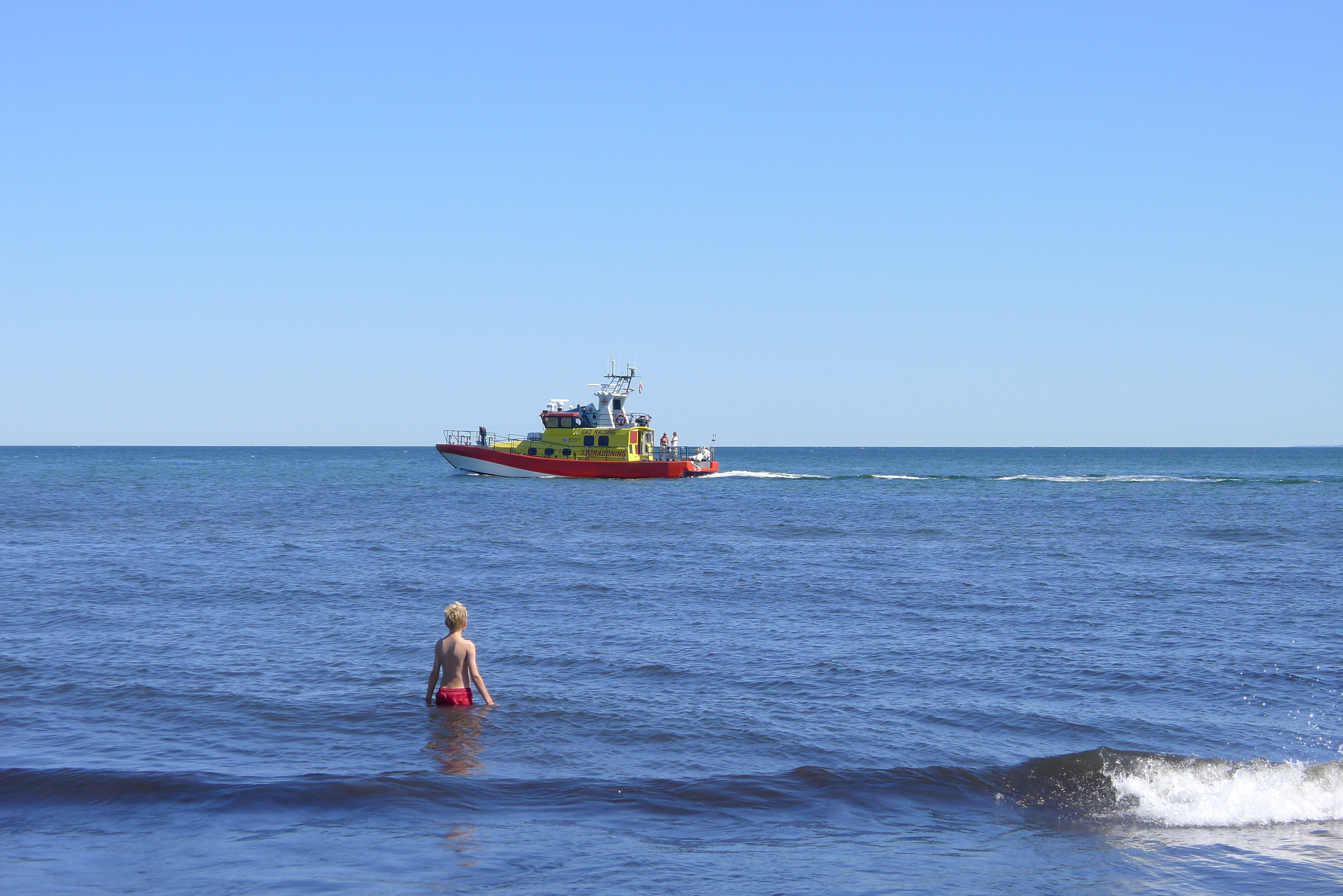
Swedish Sea Rescue Society's Rescue Gad Rausing, stationed in Skillinge, outside Mälarhusen

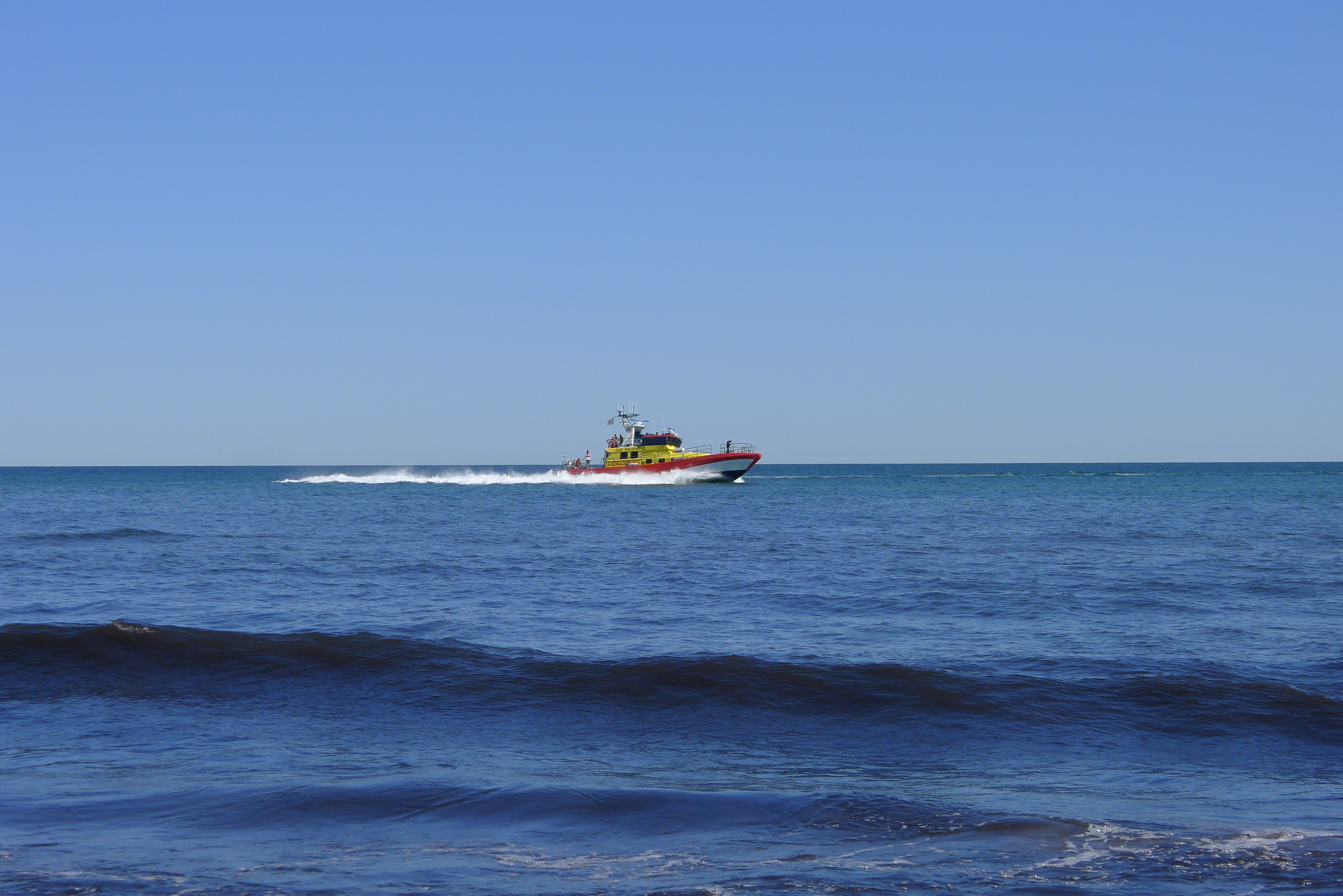
Rescue Gad Rausing, outside Mälarhusen

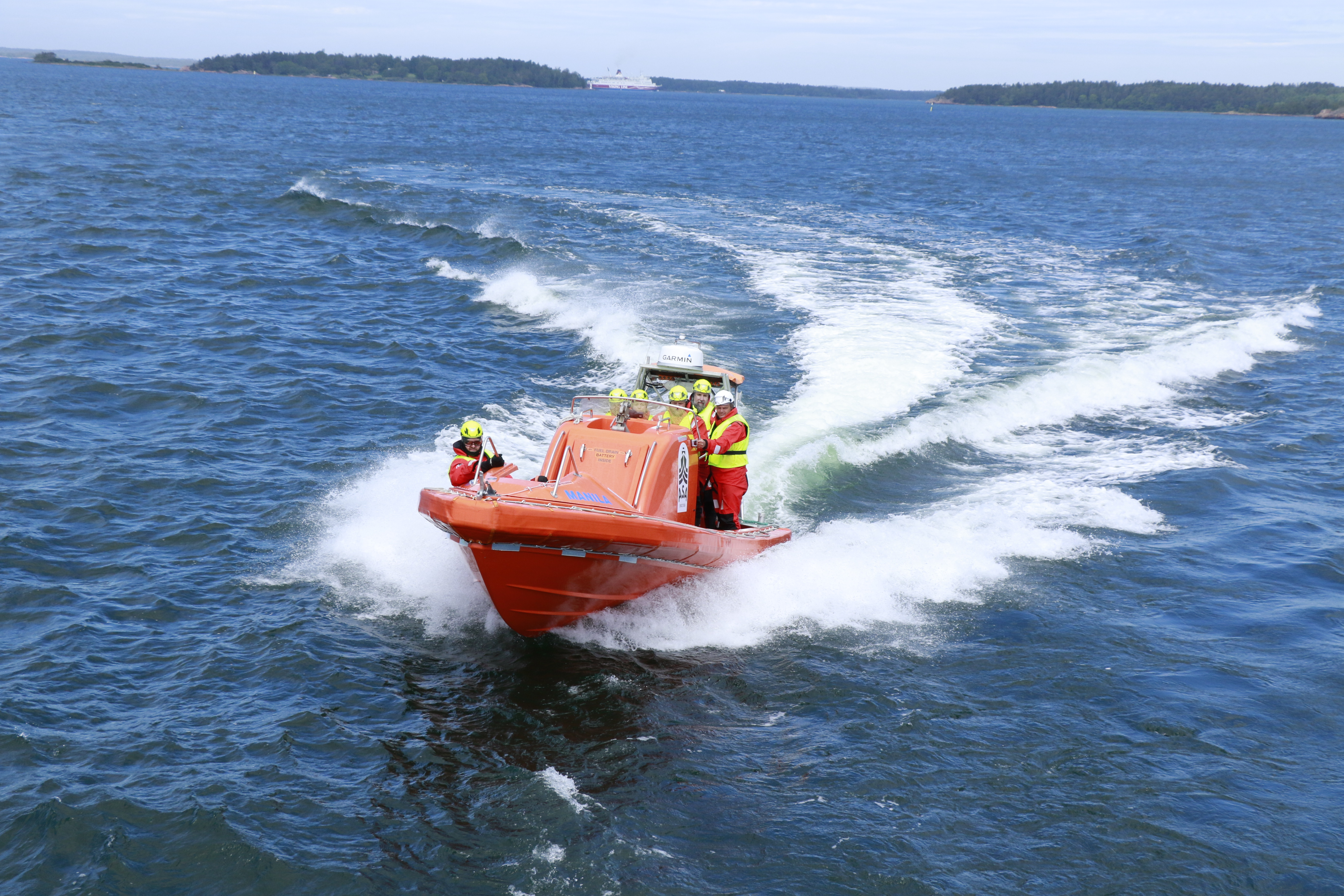
Fast rescue boat during the STCW-course of the Alandica Shipping Academy in Åland

== See also ==
- Airborne lifeboat
- Boat
- Convoy rescue ship
- International Maritime Rescue Federation
- James Beeching (1778–1858), inventor of the self-righting lifeboat
- List of RNLI stations
- Muster drill
- Royal National Lifeboat Institution
- Search and Rescue
