= Hermann Marwede =

German search and rescue cruiser

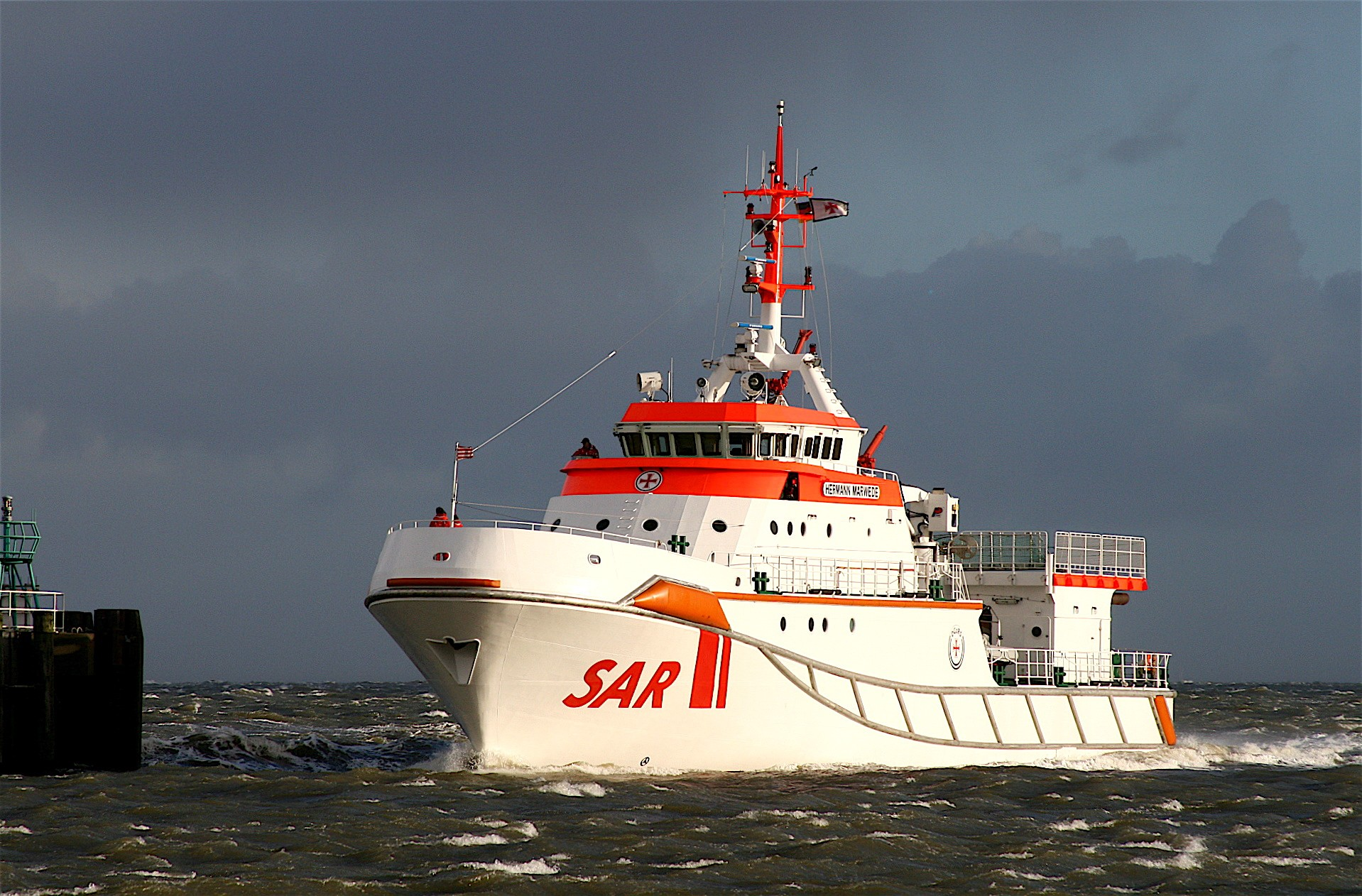
- Hermann Marwede (SK29)

History

Germany
- Namesake: Hermann Marwede
- Builder: Aluship Gdańsk, Fassmer shipyard
- Launched: 2003
- Homeport: Bremen
- Identification: IMO number: 9282601; Callsign: DBAR
- Status: in active service

General characteristics
- Displacement: 404 long tons (410 t)
- Length: 46 m (151 ft)
- Beam: 10.66 m (35.0 ft)
- Depth: 2.8 m (9.2 ft)
- Speed: 25 knots (46 km/h; 29 mph)
- Endurance: 7 days, 2,500 nmi (4,600 km; 2,900 mi); Designed to be on patrol 2,500 hours per year
- Boats & landing craft carried: 1 × RHIB
- Complement: 2 officers, 6 crew

Hermann Marwede (SK 29) is the largest search and rescue cruiser (46-m-class) of German Maritime Search and Rescue Service (DGzRS) and the largest search and rescue cruiser in the world. The ship is based at the SAR-station Helgoland.

The boat was built in 2003 at Fassmer-Werft in Berne, Motzen (Weser), Germany; the hull was built from aluminium by Aluship Gdańsk, Gdańsk, Poland. The daughter-boat Verena was built at Lürssen shipyard. In 2012, the original daughter-boat was changed to a rigid-hulled inflatable boat of the same name.

Total cost for the ship was just under 15 million Euros. The namesake of the cruiser, Hermann Marwede, born in Bremen in 1878 and died there in 1959, had been personally liable partner of the brewery Beck & Co. for around 50 years. Twelve grandchildren and great-grandchildren of Marwede made a significant contribution to financing the ship.
