= Abeille =

Abeille may refer to:

== Ships ==
- HMS Abeille (1796), a ship of the Royal Navy
- Abeille Bourbon, a high sea tow vessel
- Abeille Flandre, a high sea tug of the French navy
- Abeille Liberté, a salvage tug
- Abeille Provence, a salvage tug, later the Ryan Leet
- ST Abeille No 7, a tug, originally the Empire Helen
- ST Abeille No 8, a tug, originally the Empire Simon
- ST Abeille No 22, a tug, originally the Empire Alfred
- ST Abeille No 23, a tug, originally the Empire Sprite

== People ==
- Abeille de Perrin (1843–1910), full name Elzéar Emmanuel Arène Abeille de Perrin, French entomologist
- Scipion Abeille (died 1697), French physician
- Gaspard Abeille (1648–1718), French poet
- Pierre-César Abeille (1674 – after 1733), French composer
- Guy Abeille, French economist
- Jacques Abeille (1942–2022), French writer
- Louis Paul Abeille (1719–1807), French economist
- Ludwig Abeille (1761–1838), German pianist and composer
- Rafael Nieto Abeillé, Puerto Rican lawyer

== Other uses ==
- SNCAC NC.2001 Abeille, French 1940s helicopter
- Abeille (local currency), a local currency of Villeneuve-sur-Lot, France
- Abeilles FC, Congolese football club
