= Antoine Godeau =

French bishop, poet, and exegete (1605–1672)

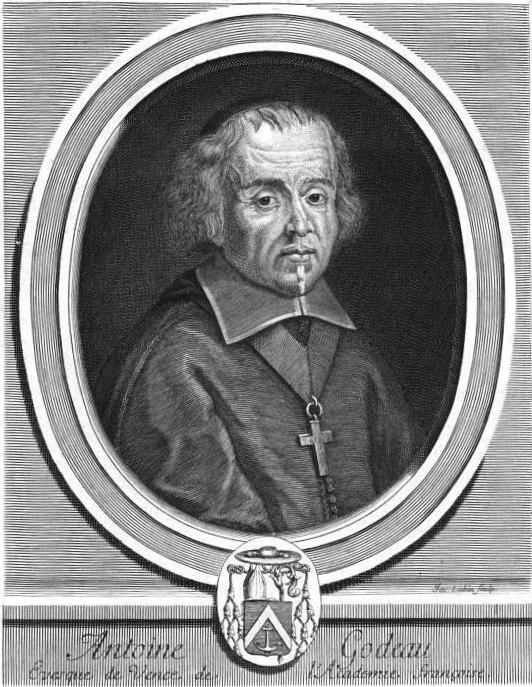
Antoine Godeau.

Antoine Godeau (24 September 1605, in Dreux – 21 April 1672, in Vence) was a French bishop, writer, Baroque Précieuses poet, and exegete. He is now known for his work of criticism Discours de la poésie chrétienne from 1633.

== Biography ==
Antoine Godeau was born in Dreux on 24 September 1605. Early publications by Godeau which drew attention included seven letters he authored that were published in Nicolas Faret's Recueil (1627) and Discours sur les œuvres de Malherbe (1630); the latter of which championed the poet François de Malherbe. Godeau's cousin was Valentin Conrart; a central figure among a new literary culture in Paris who likely used his influence to smooth Godeau's introduction to prominent Paris salons in 1632. Like his cousin, Antoine was part of a circle of brilliant intellectuals known as Illustres Bergeres. It met regularly at the Hôtel de Rambouillet in Paris, and ultimately became the Académie française in 1635 in which Godeau was one its founding members.

Godeau garnered the favor of both Cardinal Louis de Nogaret de La Valette and Cardinal Richelieu, and to the latter dedicated his Oeuvres chrestiennes (1633); a work which signaled his interest is pursuing the priesthood. At the age of 30 he began formally pursuing training in religious vocation during which time he began writing poems that were paraphrases of the Psalms The first of these, Benedicite omnia opera Domini, was dedicated to Richelieu. He was officially made a priest on 6 May 1636, and six weeks later was named Bishop of Grasse by Richelieu on 21 June.

Godeau continued to write his paraphrases of the Psalms while a bishop; eventually completing paraphrases of all 150 psaltry. Several composers set these paraphrases to music; including four of them by King Louis XIII and all of them by Jacques de Gouy, but only 50 of which were published. Thomas Gobert composed the most popular music settings of Godeau's psaltry poems, and other composers to set these texts to music included Artus Aux-Cousteaux, Antoine Lardenois, Étienne Moulinié, Henri Dumont, and Pierre-César Abeille among others.

By a Bull of Pope Innocent X Godeau was empowered to unite the Dioceses of Grasse and Vence under his administration; an event which took place in 1638. Seeing the dissatisfaction of the clergy of the latter diocese, he relinquished the former in 1653 and established himself at Vence.

Godeau by no means gave up other interests. In 1645 and 1655 he took a prominent part in the General Assembly of the French Clergy, and under the regency of Anne of Austria was deputy from the Estates of Provence.

Godeau died in Vence on 21 April 1672 at the age of sixty-seven. The cause was apoplexy.

== Works ==
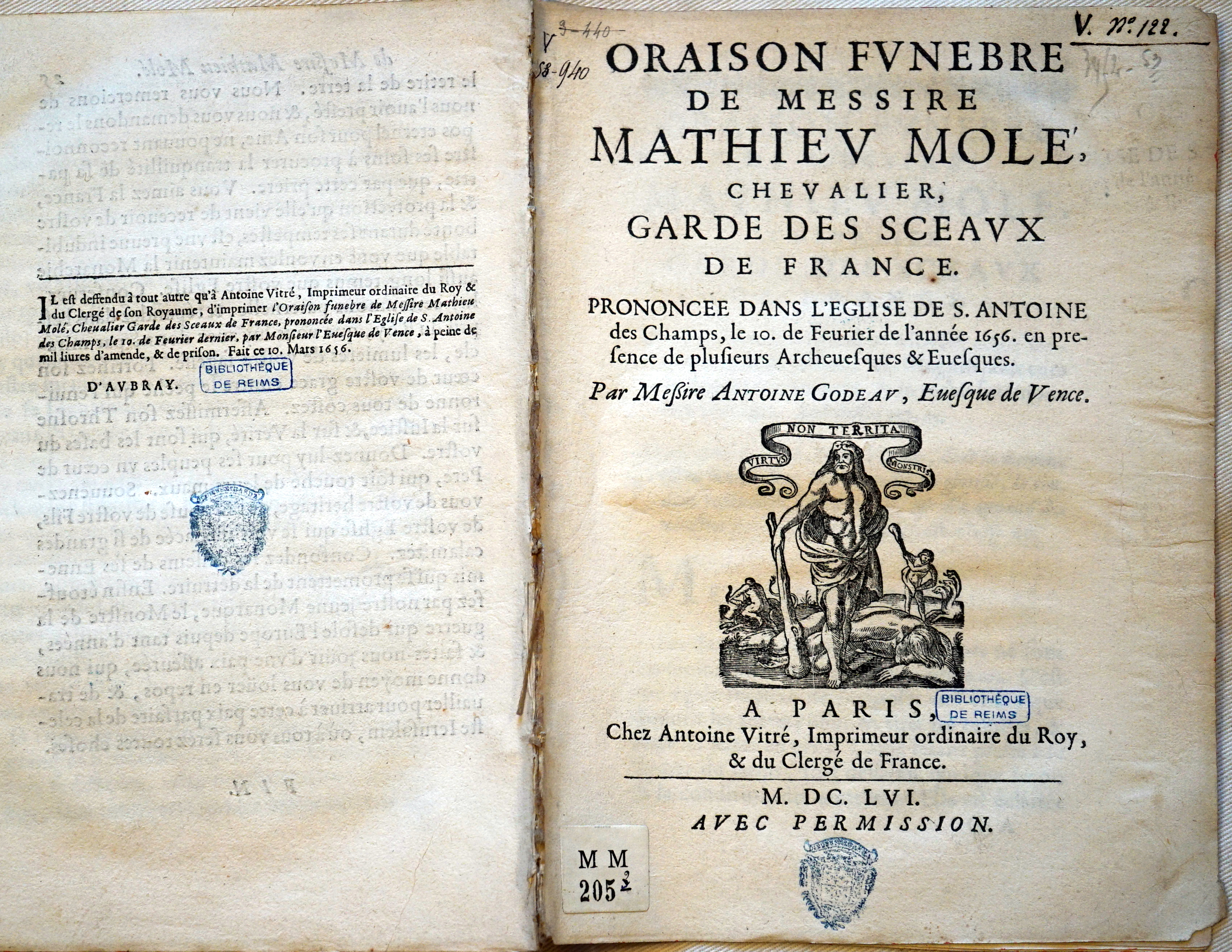
Eulogy of Mathieu Molé by Antoine Godeau.

He turned his talent for versification to religious uses, his best known productions being a metrical version of the Psalms, poems on Paul the Apostle, the Assumption, Eustace, Mary Magdalen, and one of 15,000 lines on the annals of the Catholic Church. The monotony and mechanical arrangement of the poems are relieved at intervals by passages remarkable for thought or expression, among others those lines embodied by Corneille in his Polyeucte:

Leur glore tombe par terre,
Et comme elle a l'éclat du verre,
Elle en a la fragilité.

The Jesuit poet François Vavasseur (1605–1681) published, in 1647, a satire on Godeau, Antonius Godellus, episcopus Grassensis, the verdict of which was echoed by Boileau in a letter to Maucroix.

His Eloges des evesques, qui dans tous les siècles de l'Eglise ont fleury en doctrine et en sainteté (Paris, 1665) was republished in 1802 by M. Sauffret. His Histoire de l'Eglise (Paris, 1633) was translated into Italian by Sperone Speroni and into German by Hyper and Groote (Augsburg, 1768–96), and is still cited. Of this work Johann Baptist Alzog says that "although written in an attractive and popular style, it is lacking in solid worth and original research" (Manual of Universal History, I, Dublin, 1900, 33). It is related that during the publication of this work the author chanced one day in a library to engage in conversation with the Oratorian, Charles Le Cointe, who, ignorant of Godeau's identity, indicated some grave defects in the volumes which had already appeared, criticisms of which the author availed himself in correcting the work for a new edition. The same Le Cointe, later a staunch friend of Godeau's, while conceding to the complete work many excellencies, calls attention to its frequent inaccuracies and lack of critical balance. Minor writings of Godeau's include L'Idée du bon magistrat en la vie et en la mort de Mr de Cordes, conseiller au Chastelet de Paris (1645) and Eloges historiques des empereurs, des roys, des princes..... qui dans tous les Siècles ont excellé en piété (1667).

Among Godeau's works of a religious character are:

- Prières, méditations (Paris, 1643)
- Avis à Messieurs de Paris pour le culte du Saint Sacrement dans les Paroisses, & de la façon de le porter aux malades (1644)
- Ordonnances et Instructions synodales (1644)
- Vie de Saint Paul Apôtre (1647)
- La vie de saint Augustin (1652)
- La panégyrique de saint Augustin (1653)
- La vie de saint Charles Borromée (1657)
- Eloge de Saint François de Sales (1663).

His chief title to fame, however, rests on his Biblical work. The Catholic Encyclopedia recommends his paraphrases of the following books as useful:

- Romans (Paris, 1635)
- Corinthians, Galatians, and Ephesians (1632)
- Thessalonians, Timothy, Titus, and Philemon (1641)
- Hebrews (1637)
- the canonical Epistles (1640)

His Version expliquée du Nouveau Testament de Nostre Seigneur Jésus-Christ (1668) is something between a literal translation and a paraphrase. The greatest of all his works, according to Jean-Pierre Nicéron, is La morale chrétienne pour l'instruction des Curez et des Prêtres du diocèse de Vence (Paris, 1709), intended to combat the Casuists, a model of force, clearness, and revealing a precision rarely to be found in the other writings of the same author. In the Latin translation, which appeared at Augsburg in 1774 under the title Theologia moralis ex purissimis s. Scripturæ, patrum ac conciliorum fontibus derivata, notis theologicis illustrata, the arrangement of the matter is greatly improved.

== See also ==
- Hercule Audiffret
