= Cyclone Kyrill =

Extratropical cyclone that struck northern Europe in 2007

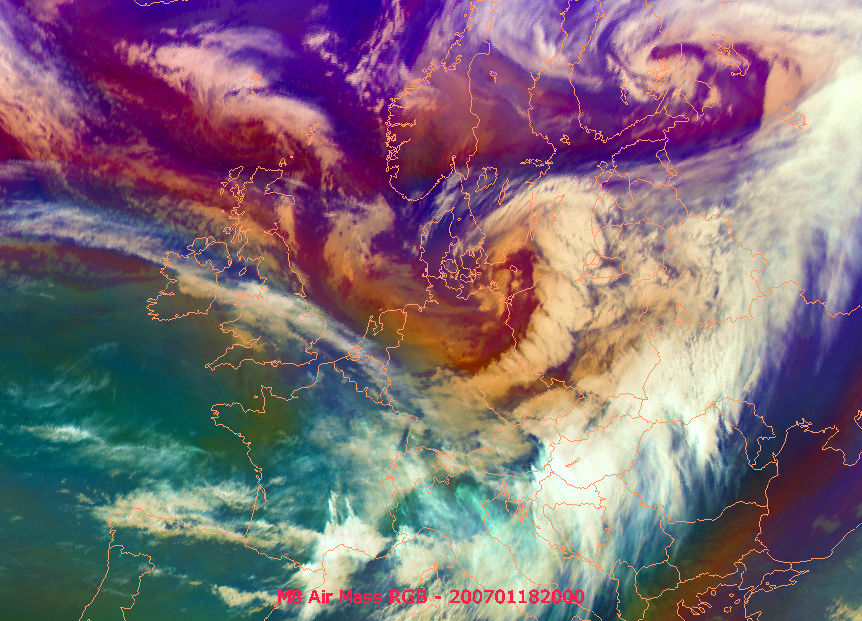
- RGB composite view of Kyrill in 18 January 2007 from EUMETSAT

Meteorological history
- Formed: 15 January 2007
- Dissipated: 24 January 2007

Extratropical cyclone
- Highest gusts: 212 km/h (132 mph; 114 kn) at Śnieżka, Poland
- Lowest pressure: 959.8 hPa (mbar); 28.34 inHg

Overall effects
- Fatalities: At least 44
- Damage: At least €1 billion
- Areas affected: Austria, Belgium, Czech Republic, Denmark, Estonia, France, Germany, Ireland, Latvia, Lithuania, Luxembourg, Netherlands, Norway, Poland, Russia, Slovakia, Ukraine, United Kingdom

Cyclone Kyrill /ˈkɪrɪl/ was a low-pressure area that evolved into an unusually violent European windstorm, forming an extratropical cyclone with hurricane-strength winds. It formed over Newfoundland on 15 January 2007 and moved across the Atlantic Ocean reaching Ireland and Great Britain by the evening of 17 January. The storm then crossed the North Sea on 17 and 18 January, making landfall on the German and Dutch coasts on the afternoon of 18 January, before moving eastwards toward Poland and the Baltic Sea on the night from 18 to 19 January and further on to northern Russia.

Kyrill caused widespread damage across Western Europe, especially in the United Kingdom and Germany. Forty-seven fatalities were reported, as well as extensive disruptions of public transport, power outages to over one hundred thousand homes, severe damage to public and private buildings and major forest damage through windthrow. Twenty tornadoes were reported, the strongest of which were two F3 tornadoes which impacted the towns of Lauchhammer and Wittenberg in eastern Germany on 18 January.

The storm was named "Kyrill" on 17 January 2007, by the Free University of Berlin's meteorological institute. The storm was named after a Bulgarian man living near Berlin, whose family donated to the university's "Adopt-A-Vortex" programme.

== Abstract ==
A European windstorm is a severe cyclonic storm that moves across the North Atlantic towards north-western Europe in the winter months. These storms usually move over the north coast of the United Kingdom, towards Norway but can veer south to affect other countries including Ireland, France, Belgium, the Netherlands, Denmark, Sweden, Austria, Germany, the Czech Republic, Slovakia, Slovenia, Switzerland, and Poland. As these storms can generate hurricane-force winds (and sometimes even winds at the strength of major hurricanes), they are sometimes referred to as hurricanes, even though few originate as tropical cyclones.

These storms rank as the second-highest cause of global natural catastrophe insurance loss (after US hurricanes).

Kyrill was unusual in that its field of hurricane-force winds was very broad, affecting large areas of Germany as well as neighbouring countries at one time. Kyrill brought wind gusts of up to 130 km/h (81 mph) even in the North German plains. German weather experts have described the storm as a "once in a decade" event.

== Events ==
After making landfall in Ireland and the UK in the late hours of 17 January 2007, the storm swept across Ireland and Great Britain on the night of 17 to 18 January, with winds of 160 km/h (99 mph) at The Needles, 149 km/h (93 mph) recorded in Dublin, 130 km/h (81 mph) recorded at Aberdaron on the Lleyn peninsula, 122 km/h (76 mph) at Mumbles near Swansea and winds of 101 km/h (63 mph) at St Athan in the Vale of Glamorgan. The German Meteorological Service had advised people to stay indoors and avoid unnecessary trips on 18 January, and wind strengths of up to 12 on the Beaufort scale were seen across the Netherlands and Germany as the storm made landfall. The storm moved across the German states of Lower Saxony, Bremen, Hamburg, Schleswig-Holstein and North Rhine-Westphalia first, then spread across the whole country in the evening hours of 18 January. Wind gusts as high as 202 km/h (126 mph) on the Wendelstein and 198 km/h (123 mph) on the Brocken in the Harz mountains were recorded. The storm then moved eastwards, its center crossing Lower Saxony between 18:00 and 19:00 CET, moving toward the Baltic Sea, its cold front spawning several tornadoes in Germany. In Poland the highest wind speed was measured on Sněžka in the Krkonoše mountains, where wind gusts reached 212 km/h (132 mph). In the Czech Republic winds as high as 200 km/h (120 mph) disrupted both rail and air traffic; record-high temperatures reached 14 °C (57 °F) in Prague. The UK Met office in a case study stated that Kyrill would have generated a red warning on the colour scale they adopted in 2008. The storm was classified Hurricane-force 12 on the Beaufort scale. This is the highest classification on the modern scale.

== Impact ==
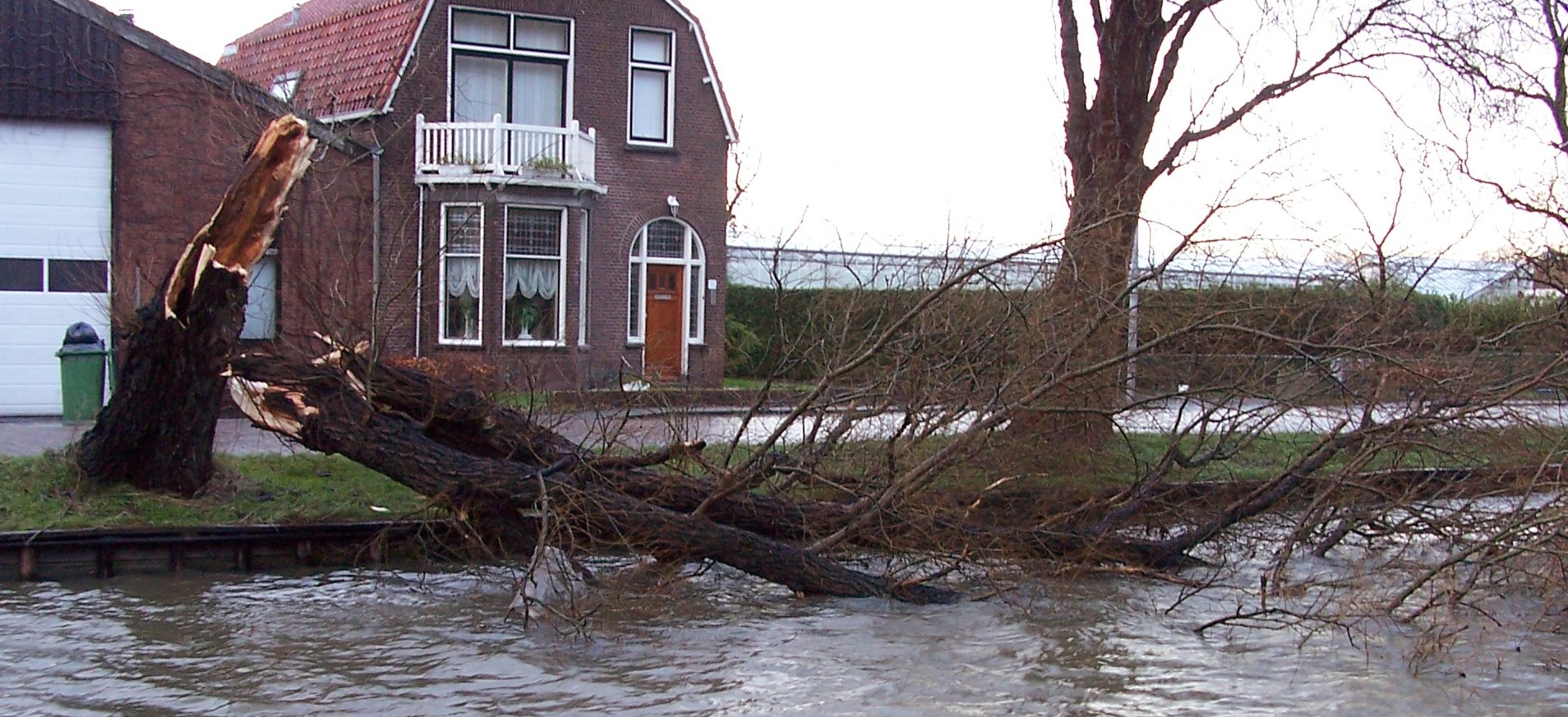
Storm damage in Delft, Netherlands

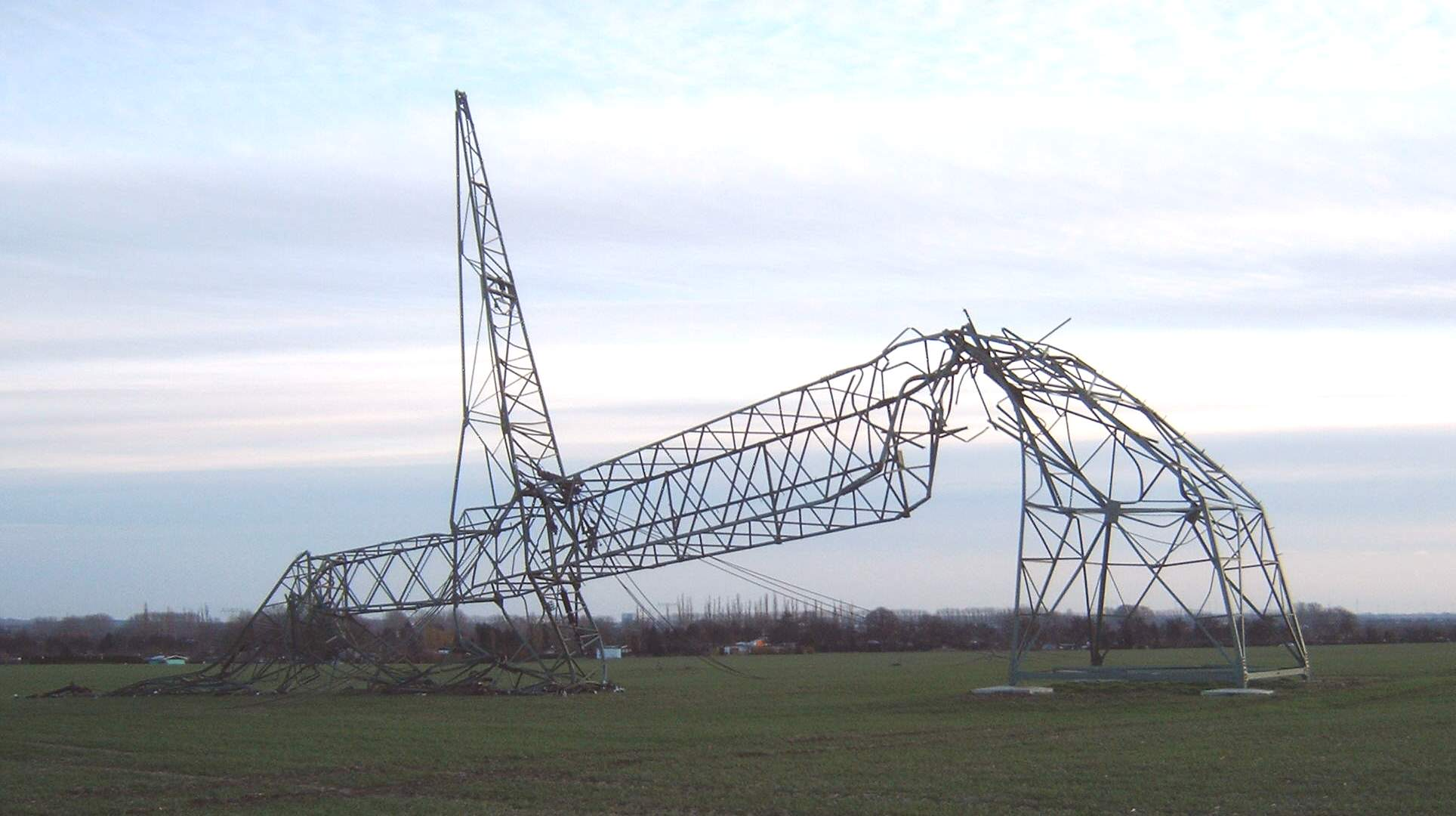
Felled power pylons caused widespread electricity outages

On the day of the landfall, an approximate 25,000 homes in southern England were without electricity after electricity pylons were damaged by the storm. Same day, the German states of Brandenburg, Saxony and Saxony-Anhalt were hit by a massive power cut. Fifty-two thousand homes were without energy, according to local utility envia. The German district Siegen-Wittgenstein had issued a state of emergency, with schools remaining closed on Friday, 19 January, and roads not to be cleared right away, but closed instead until the situation improved. By the second day of the storm, more than one million homes were left without power in the Czech Republic with another million households without electricity in Germany and tens of thousands dark homes in Austria and Poland. In Poland, a flood alarm was issued in several localities due to large rainfalls and the storm damaged several houses in the region of Jelenia Góra. In Ukraine, the supply of oil through the Druzhba pipeline came to a complete halt as a result of the storm. Strong winds over the Alps became foehn wind and caused unusually high temperatures in Italy (up to 25 °C [77 °F] in Turin).

In Ireland thousands of homes were left without power and heavy downpours caused flash flooding.

In the Netherlands, the storm flood warning system (Stormvloedwaarschuwingsdienst) was activated, as the approaching storm was measured in excess of 10 Beaufort. Alarms were issued to two northern regions, Delfzijl and Harlingen, at approximately 22:30 CET on Thursday 18 January. The water level peaked in the early hours of Friday, almost 4.5 m (15 ft) above the astronomical prediction level.

High winds in the Alps prompted the Austrian weather service to advise the skiers and snowboarders to seek shelter, and caused at least one major motorway tunnel closure.

The cost of the damage across Europe to the insurance industry has been estimated by Swiss Re as €3.5 billion. In the UK, the cost to the insurance industry could be as high as £350 million (€520 million). As the event is relatively recent for the insurance industry these are unlikely to be the final costs.

=== Notable buildings ===
Several windows were broken at the Römisch-Germanisches Museum in Cologne, Germany by plywood that was covering a fountain near Cologne Cathedral. The wood caused major damage to the encasing of a Roman mosaic dating to the 3rd century. The Römisch-Germanisches Museum building was originally constructed around the mosaic. As of January 2007, it was still unclear whether the mosaic had suffered damage, as museum staff had announced the clean-up would at least take a week due to the fragility of the exhibit. Museum manager Bernhard Ostermann had estimated that the mosaic was damaged in 100 to 150 places.

The chapel of Wittenberg Castle in Wittenberg, Germany, which is a World Heritage Site, lost several of its sandstone merlons. They broke off during the storm, damaging several stained-glass windows in their fall.

=== Harbours and shipping ===
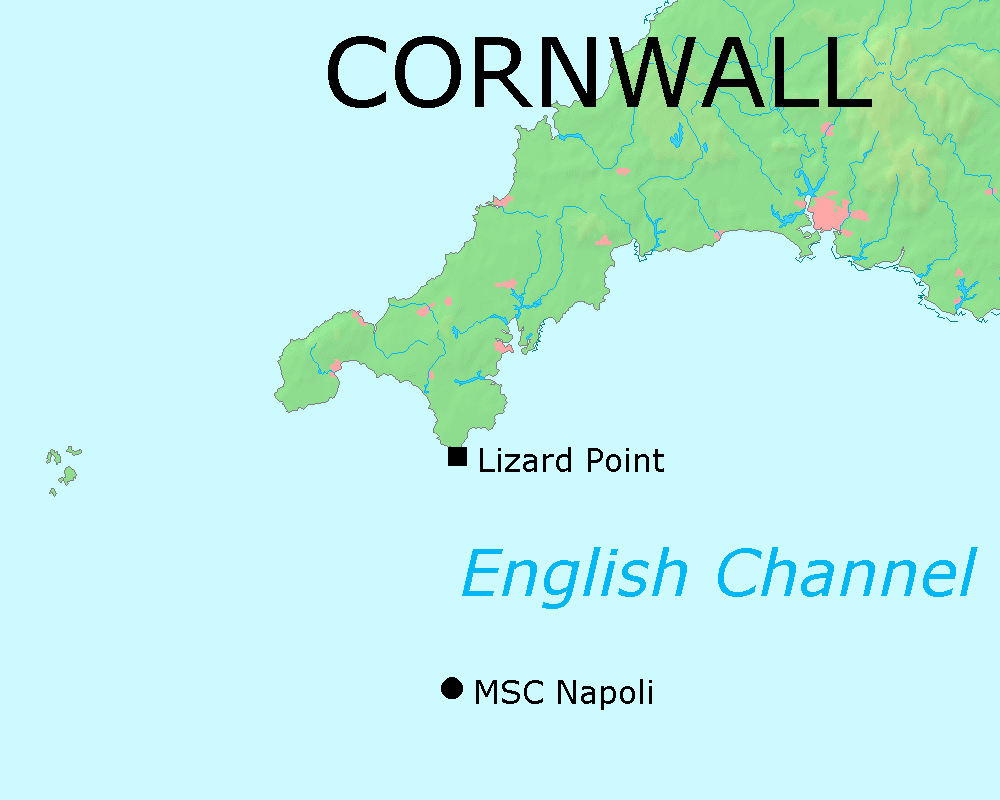
Position of MSC Napoli when it was abandoned

The container ship MSC Napoli, whilst on its way to Portugal carrying 2,394 containers, of which 158 were classed as hazardous substances, had to be abandoned in the English Channel on the 18th. The crew of 26 were picked up by British and French rescue services. The next day the Napoli was under tow for repair at Portland Harbour in Dorset, but with forecasts of further high winds it was taken to shelter in Lyme Bay. The ship had suffered structural damage, including a 1 by 0.5 m (3.3 by 1.6 ft) hole on the starboard side and water flooding and had to be beached in the bay 1 mi (1.6 km) off the East Devon coast at Branscombe The ship leaked oil, sparking a clean-up operation, and widespread reporting in the national news led to the wreck temporarily becoming a tourist attraction and subject to scavenging from the containers which washed up on the beach. The wreck was subject to a complex break-up operation which was not complete until July 2009.

The ferry services between Fishguard and Rosslare were cancelled, as well as the ferries to Heligoland and most West Frisian Islands, East Frisian and North Frisian islands. In Ireland, Dublin Port was forced to completely close for a time—the first time in history the port has closed. Two fishing vessels sank at sea, with a total loss of seven lives. A third vessel engaged in the rescue attempts also sank but the crew were rescued. A storm tide with sea levels of up to 3.5 metres (11 ft) above mean tide was announced for the coastal areas of Lower Saxony and Schleswig-Holstein by the state governments; however, the storm had already passed those areas before high tide had set in, so there was less damage than expected.

The Cypriot-flagged freighter Golden Sky, carrying a load of fertiliser and fuel oil, ran aground near Ventspils, off the coast of Latvia; the ship's crew were rescued in a joint Latvian and Swedish operation.

=== Road transport ===
Many countries suffered from road and motorway closures. In the United Kingdom, the major motorways M1, M6 and M18 were closed in several places, as well as the M25 ring road around London and a number of other motorways. Bridges including the M6 Thelwall Viaduct in Warrington, the M25 Dartford Crossing in London and the M1 Tinsley Viaduct in Sheffield were closed due to high winds. All Pennine Passes were closed. Closures were largely due to the toppling of multiple high-sided vehicles. Other motorways were affected by significant delays. Long queues developed around blackspots, in particular replacement crossings of the Manchester Ship Canal including routes through Warrington and over the Runcorn Bridge. In Germany, a number of motorways, especially those with bridges over the Rhine or those with valley bridges, also faced closures due to high winds. The Dutch police advised drivers of empty lorries not to enter the Netherlands. Many roads were also closed in Ireland due to fallen trees and overturned lorries.

=== Air transport ===
More than 280 flights were cancelled at Heathrow Airport, over 120 flights were cancelled at Doncaster Sheffield Airport and 80 more flights were cancelled due to health and safety reasons at Manchester Airport. Many flights were delayed at Ireland's airports on the morning of 19 January due to the high winds in Ireland; however, by afternoon they were delayed because of high winds elsewhere in Europe. Several flights at Frankfurt Airport were cancelled due to the bad weather. Overall, during 18 and 19 January Swiss International Air Lines announced the cancellation of at least 88 flights, British Airways cancelled 180 flights and Lufthansa cut 329 flights and warned of more delays before the service began to return to normal.

=== Railways ===
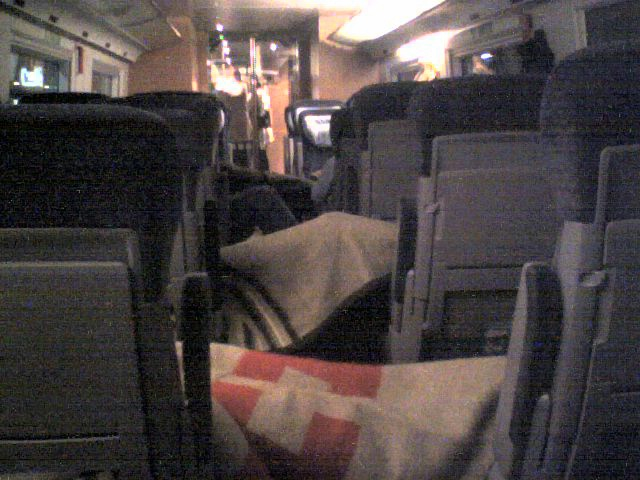
Stranded travellers sleeping in an ICE train stopped at Würzburg station

The storm seriously affected the 18 January rush hour all over Great Britain, with heavy snowfalls in Scotland adding to the unpleasant situation. A general 50 mph (80 km/h) speed restriction was put in place by Network Rail to minimise possible damages. First Great Western services between London Paddington and Cardiff were cancelled with the line from London to Reading closed, and the East Coast Main Line was operating on a reduced timetable. Virgin Trains West Coast services were cancelled from London to Scotland. London Bridge station was closed after glass panels came loose from the roof.

In the Netherlands, all train services ceased operating on the evening of 18 January. The station in Delft and the central station in Amsterdam were evacuated due to roof damages. A train driver sustained minor injuries when his train hit a tree that had fallen onto the railway near Venlo.

German railway operator Deutsche Bahn at first limited the maximum speed of its trains to 200 km/h (120 mph), then all services on the domestic InterCity/InterCityExpress network as well as the local services in Northern and Western Germany were discontinued from 17:15 on 18 January onwards, as major main lines (Bremen-Hannover, Hamburg-Hanover, Bremen-Osnabrück) and many branch lines were affected by the storm. In an unprecedented move, Deutsche Bahn discontinued virtually all train services in Germany at 19:30 CET until further notice, with only very limited local services running on a per-line decision basis. Trains currently on the lines would stop at the next station and stay there, leaving passengers stranded all over Germany in the tens of thousands. Later, as the situation was worsening, trains were left open for those passengers unable to find a hotel to sleep in. In major affected stations, such as Münster and Hanover, air raid shelters in the stations were opened up for the night, with the Red Cross issuing blankets to stranded passengers. Train services were resumed on the morning of 19 January, but cancellations and delays continued during the weekend as 34,000 kilometres (21,000 mi) of track needed to be checked and cleared. The DB was faced by the massive challenge of getting its network into working order again after coming to a full stop during the night, the first such event ever to happen on the German railway network in peacetime. On 18 January, an InterCity train ran into a tree that had fallen onto the tracks between Elmshorn and Westerland. One of the locomotives was damaged, no casualties were reported. An InterCity train with 450 passengers on board was stuck near Diepholz and had to be evacuated, Duisburg Hauptbahnhof station was suffering from a power outage as the result of a grid failure.

==== Berlin Hauptbahnhof ====
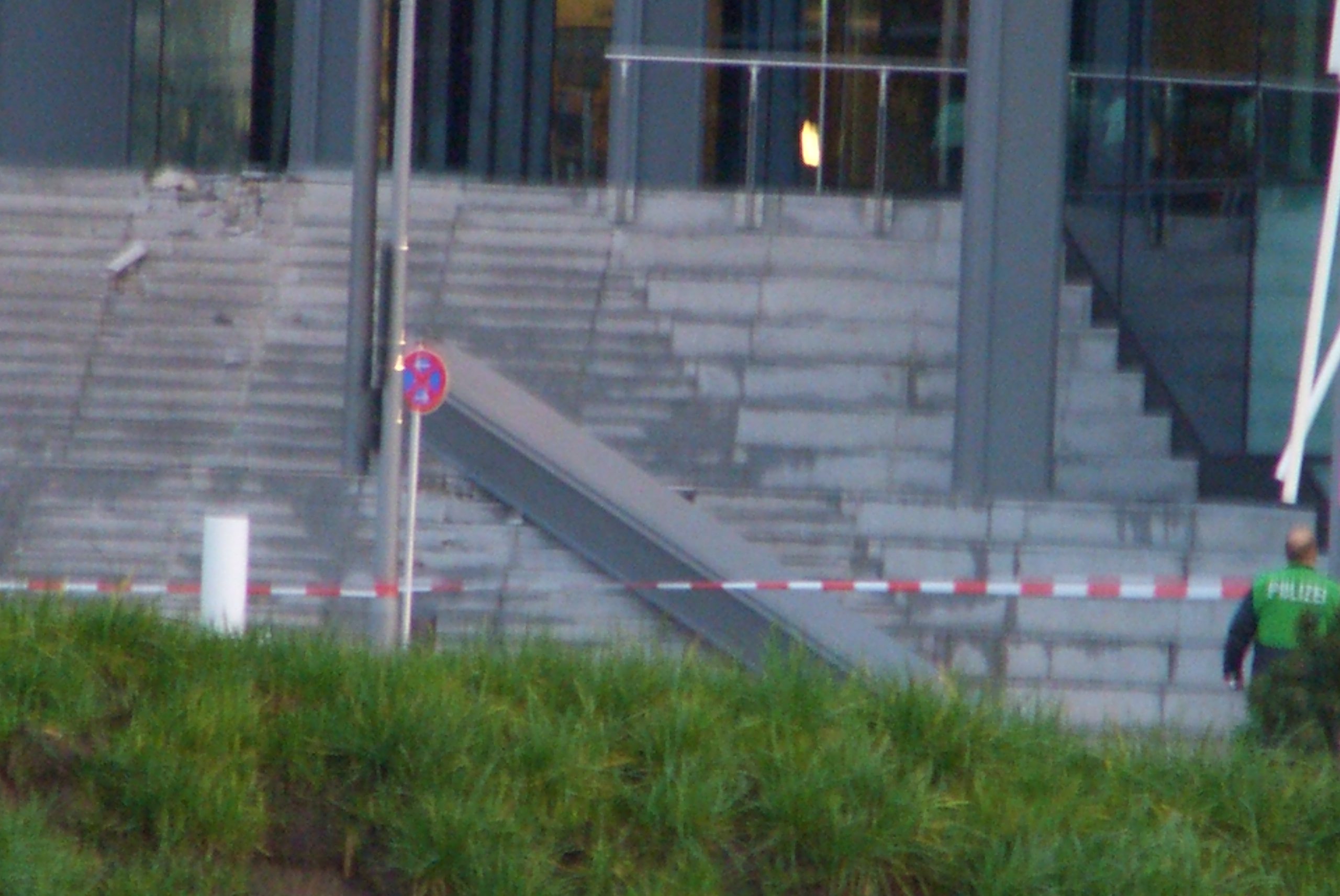
Fallen girder at Berlin Hauptbahnhof

Late on 18 January, the central railway station in Berlin suffered from major structural damage. A two-ton girder fell from a height of 40 metres (130 ft), damaging an outside stairwell. The station was completely evacuated, as glass plates from the façade were coming loose and falling to the pavement below. On the early afternoon of 19 January, the station was opened to the public again. Discussion started as to whether the eight-month-old station was suffering from design failures, but these claims were rejected by both Deutsche Bahn and the architect. The girders provide no means of structural support and are, for architectural reasons, only lying on small supports similar to a shelf and not permanently fixed in place. The DB claimed that it will address the problem by welding additional supports in front of the girders, and that they would close the station at winds exceeding 8 bft (> 75 km/h or 47 mph) until the problem was resolved. On the afternoon of 21 January 2007, the station was closed again to the public due to heavy winds at the time. and remained closed until 20:00 CET.

=== Storm Worm ===
One of the quickest-spreading computer worms of all time appears to have been named for this event. The Storm Worm causes massive amounts of spam to appear on a user's computer. Some of the emails that appear reference Kyrill in them.

=== Casualties and fatalities ===
According to the BBC News, at least 43 people were killed by the evening of 19 January.

The casualties were distributed as follows:

| Fatalities | Country |
|---|---|
| 13 | Germany |
| 11 | United Kingdom |
| 7 | Ireland |
| 7 | Netherlands |
| 6 | Poland |
| 4 | Czech Republic |
| 3 | France |
| 3 | Belgium |
| 1 | Austria |

==== Western Europe ====
===== United Kingdom =====
In the United Kingdom the storm caused thirteen deaths:

- The first casualty of the storm was the managing director of Birmingham Airport, who was killed around 05:45 GMT when his car collided with a tree uprooted by high winds in Shropshire; a branch penetrated the windscreen and impaled him.
- In the London district of Kentish Town, a two-year-old boy died in hospital after receiving severe head injuries when a wall fell on him while he was walking with his childminder in the afternoon of 18 January.
- A female lorry driver was killed on the A629 in Yorkshire when her lorry overturned and was blown into a canal.
- A male lorry driver, who was a German national, was killed on the A55 near Chester when his lorry overturned.
- The front-seat male passenger of a car on the A329 was killed when a branch hit the car near Streatley, Berkshire; the driver was injured.
- A man was blown into metal shutters at an industrial estate in Manchester and died.
- In Byley, Cheshire, a man was hit by a tree while working on a construction site.
- An elderly man was killed in North Lincolnshire by a collapsing shed.
- A woman in Stockport was killed when a wall she tried to shelter behind fell onto her.
- In Lancashire, a man was hit by a falling canopy at a petrol station whilst refuelling and later died in hospital.
- In Woofferton, Shropshire, a lorry driver collided with another vehicle and died on the scene.

===== Netherlands =====
Seven people in the Netherlands were killed as a result of the weather.

- Two people died when a falling tree hit their car between Arnhem and Ede.
- A man near Oosterhout was killed in a collision with a truck.
- A motorcyclist died near Leersum after a collision with a tree, as well as a 17-year-old boy on a moped in Sint Oedenrode.
- An 11-year-old boy in Riel was blown in front of a car, which drove over him. The boy died on the scene.
- A 59-year-old man in Staphorst was blown off of the roof of his barn, as he was repairing the damage caused by the storm.
- Six people were injured when a crane fell through the roof of a Utrecht University building. The National Crisis Centre advised people to stay indoors, the first time such a warning has been issued.

===== France =====
In France, a driving instructor in Roubaix was killed when an electricity pole fell on top of her car. The student was severely injured. A 30-year-old man died near Abbeville, when a swerving truck crashed into his car. A woman in Lille was reported missing after the roof of a store collapsed. There was significant damage to the cathedral at Saint-Omer.

===== Belgium =====
Three people in Belgium fell victim to the storm; a 16-year-old girl in Halle died when a wall she was standing by collapsed and a man died in the province of Liège after a tree fell on top of his car. In Antwerp a 12-year-old boy was hit and seriously injured by a falling beam, and later died of his injuries.

==== Central Europe ====
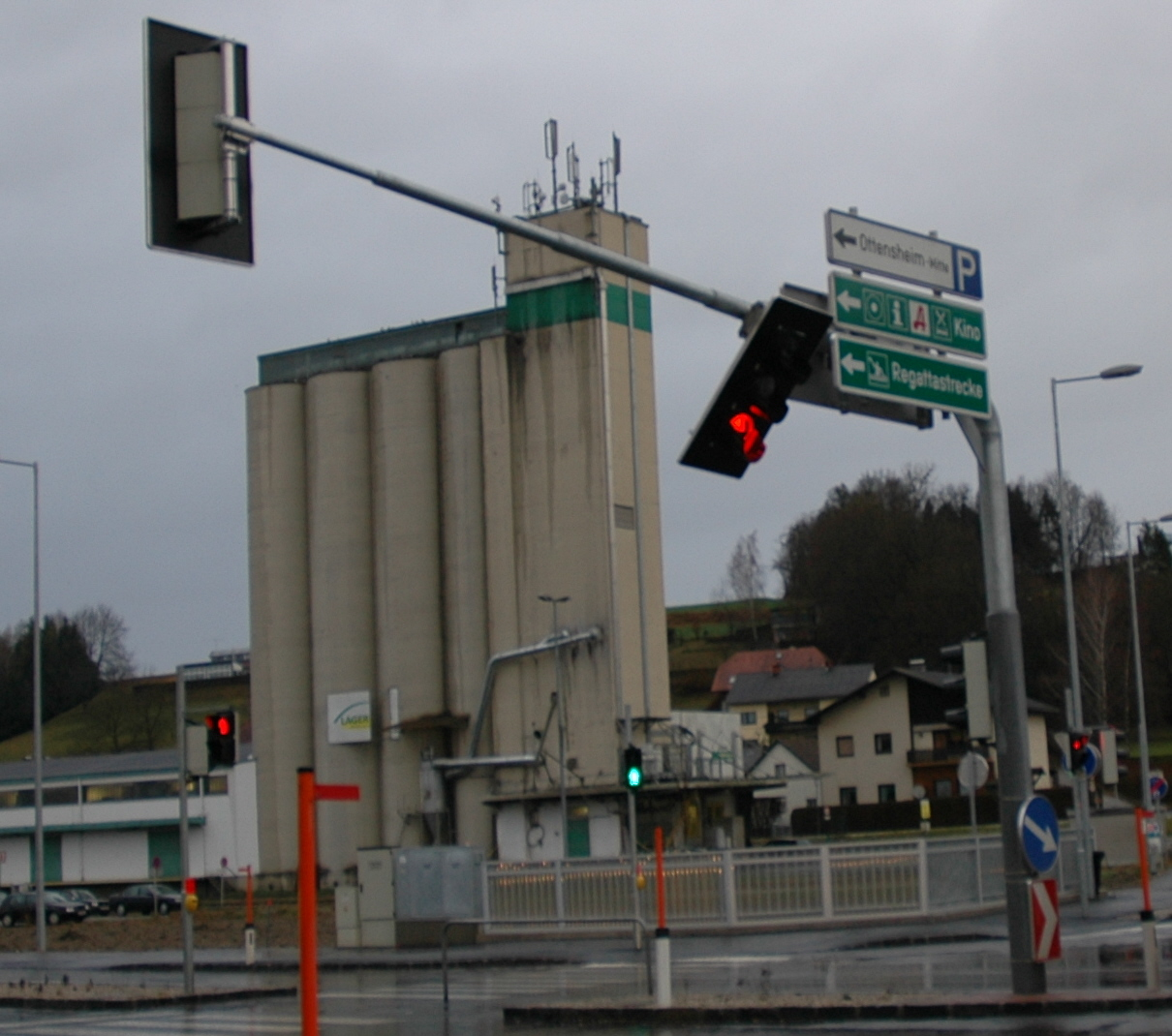
Twisted traffic light in the Danube area in Upper Austria

===== Germany =====
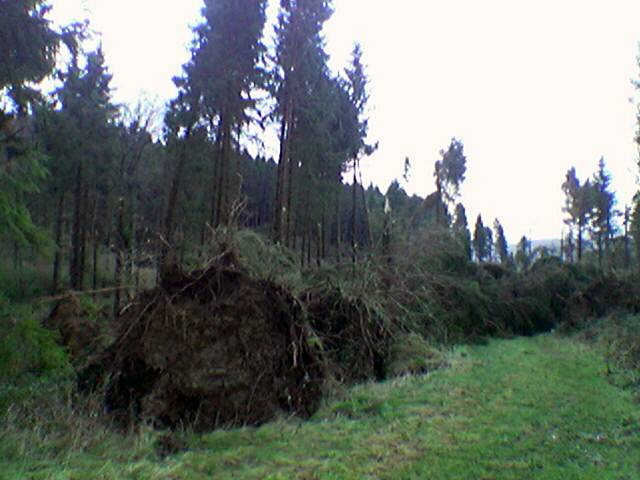
Forest in Balve

Germany was the country most severely hit by the storm, with 13 casualties as of 21 January 2007. Most deaths occurred on 18 and 19 January, though some victims were only injured at first and later died in hospital.

- In the Munich borough of Milbertshofen, an 18-month-old child was severely injured by a patio door that had broken out of its hinges. The child later died in hospital.
- Near Kirrlach in the state of Baden-Württemberg, a motorist tried to avoid a tree that had fallen onto the road and crashed into an oncoming vehicle. He was pronounced dead on the scene.
- A 73-year-old man was crushed by a barn door in Gersthofen in the district of Augsburg.
- A fireman was killed in Tönisvorst in North Rhine-Westphalia while cleaning up after the storm.
- A 36-year-old motorist was killed in Hildesheim by a fallen tree.
- A motorcycle driver slid under a tree in Essen, dying in hospital on 21 January.
- On the "Wiedenbrücker Straße" in Lippstadt, a 23-year-old woman was killed when her car was hit by a falling birch tree.
- A man was killed when a gable of a nearby building collapsed in Groß Rodensleben in the state of Saxony-Anhalt.
- In Strausberg in Brandenburg, a 25-year-old man crashed into a fallen tree with his car.
- Near Finnentrop, a man died after not noticing a tree that had fallen onto the road and crashing into it.
- A man in Mülheim an der Ruhr was killed by a falling tree.

===== Poland =====
- A crane operator was killed in Katowice when a 25-metre-high (82 ft) crane broke in half.
- 6 m (20 ft) electrical signs were torn off the hotel Wyspianski building in Kraków, causing widespread damage.
- In Elbląg between 17th and 19 January temperatures reached between 4 and 9 °C (39 and 48 °F), causing severe thunderstorm with heavy rain, winds up to 100 km/h and sub-1000-mbar pressure.
- By 19 January a total of 6 casualties and 19 people wounded have been reported, nearly 800 thousand households lacked electricity due to the damage done by the storm, about 500 were damaged.

===== Czech Republic =====
- A fireman died in Slunečná (Liberec Region) when the wind threw a tree trunk on him while he and his colleagues were clearing the road.
- Two young men died in Vestec near Prague when a tree fell on their car.

== Highest wind gust per country ==
| Country | Highest gust | Location |
|---|---|---|
| Austria | 201 km/h | Zugspitze |
| Belarus | 162 km/h | Rechytsa |
| Belgium | 142 km/h | Bredene |
| Czech Republic | 205 km/h | Harrachov |
| Denmark | 156 km/h | Rømø |
| Estonia | 145 km/h | Vilsandi |
| France | 167 km/h | Ouessant |
| Germany | 202 km/h | Chiemgau |
| Ireland | 145 km/h | Dunmore Head |
| Latvia | 144 km/h | Liepāja |
| Lithuania | 146 km/h | Klaipėda |
| Luxembourg | 130 km/h | Wincrange |
| Netherlands | 140 km/h | Burgh-Haamstede |
| Norway | 135 km/h | Spangereid |
| Poland | 250 km/h | Sněžka |
| Russia | 175 km/h | Baltiysk |
| Slovakia | 161 km/h | Lesnica & Zuberec |
| Sweden | 144 km/h | Karlskrona |
| Ukraine | 164 km/h | Kamianets-Podilskyi |
| United Kingdom | 160 km/h | The Needles |

== Gallery ==
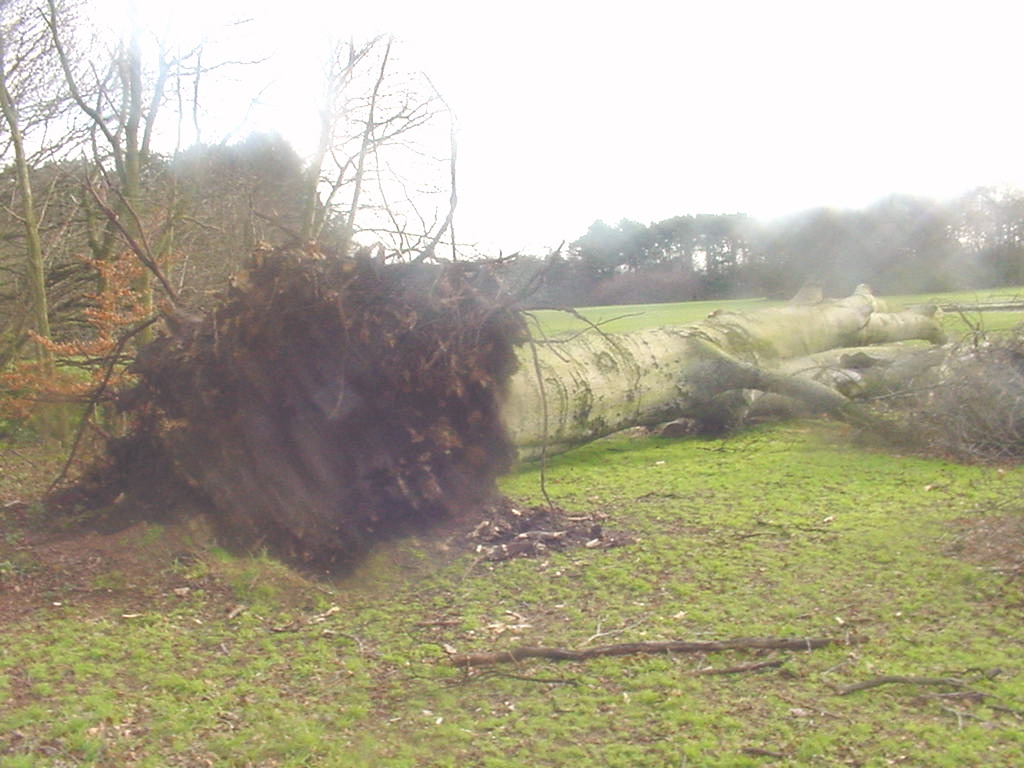
Windthrown tree in Wythenshawe Park, Manchester, England

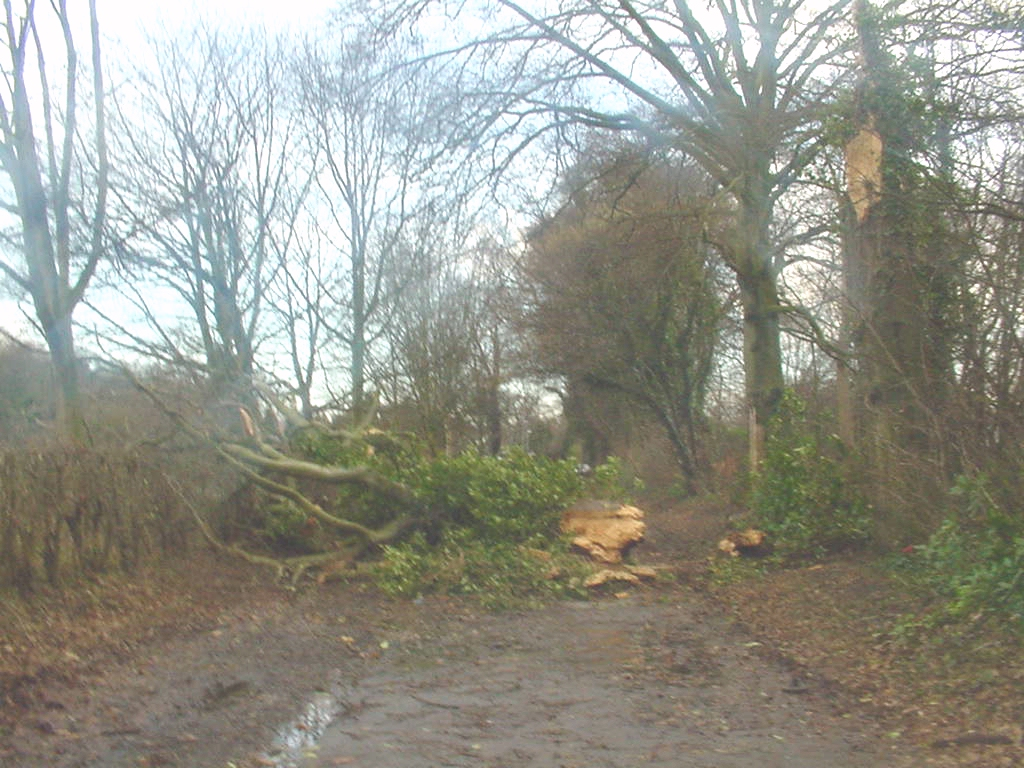
Windthrown part of tree, Wythenshawe Park, Manchester, England

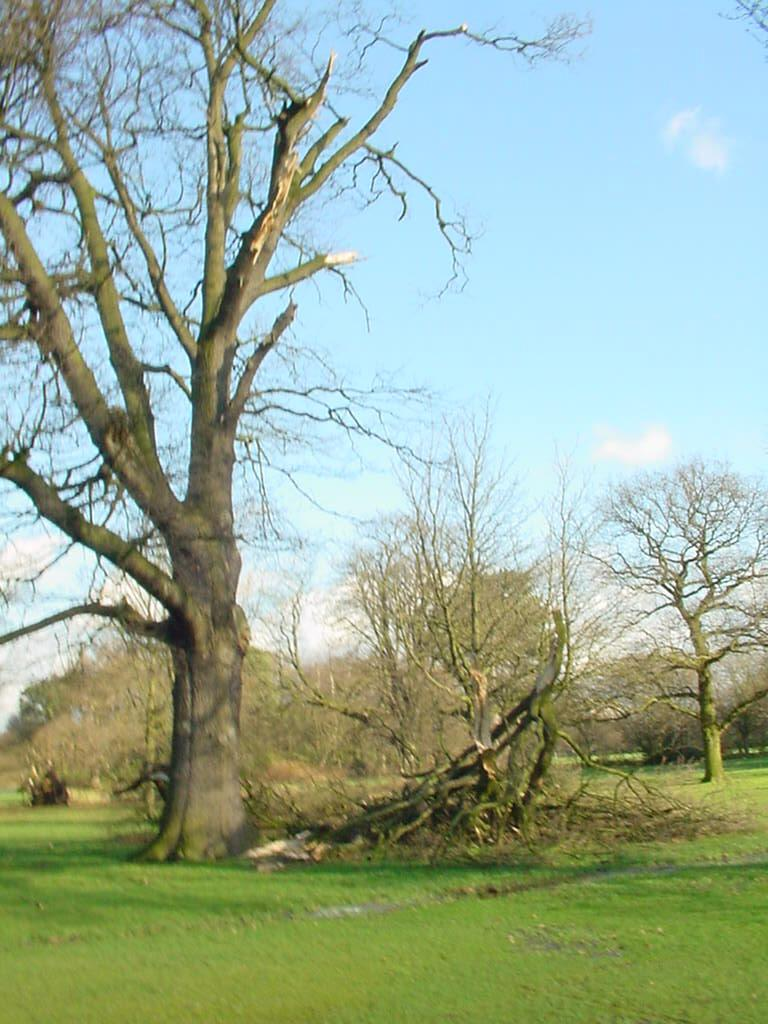
Branches broken off a tree in Wythenshawe Park, Manchester, England. Windthrown tree in background.

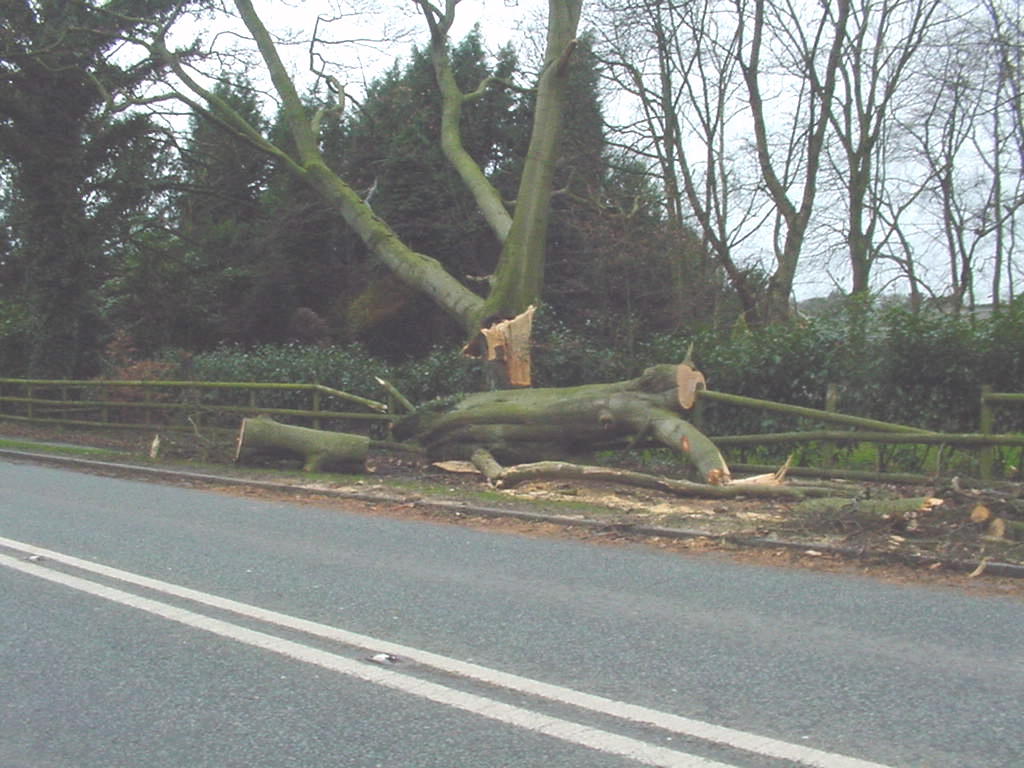
Windthrown tree after first-stage clearing up, Hale, Greater Manchester, England

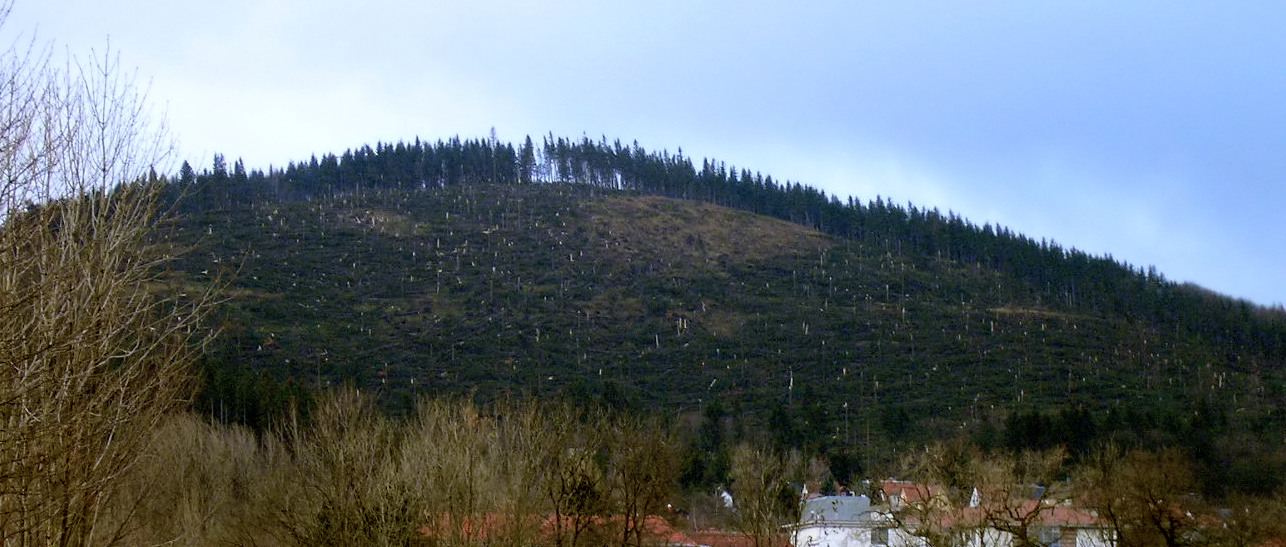
The forest on the Lindenberg mountain above Ilmenau, Germany was heavily damaged.

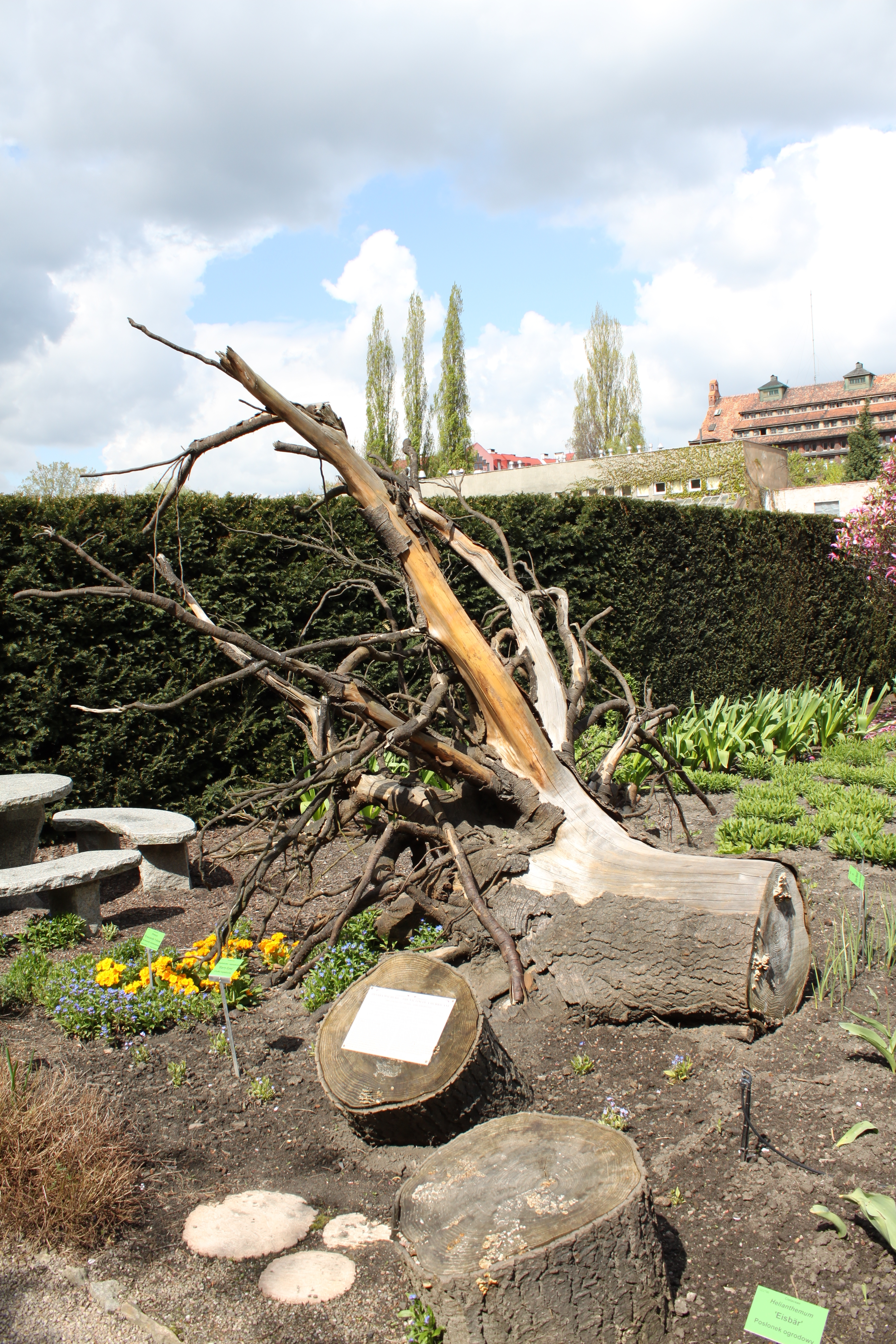
Abies concolor subsp. lowiana roots in Botanical Garden in Wrocław. This tree was overthrown by hurricane Kyrill at night on 18 January 2007. The age of this tree is ca. 65–70 years.

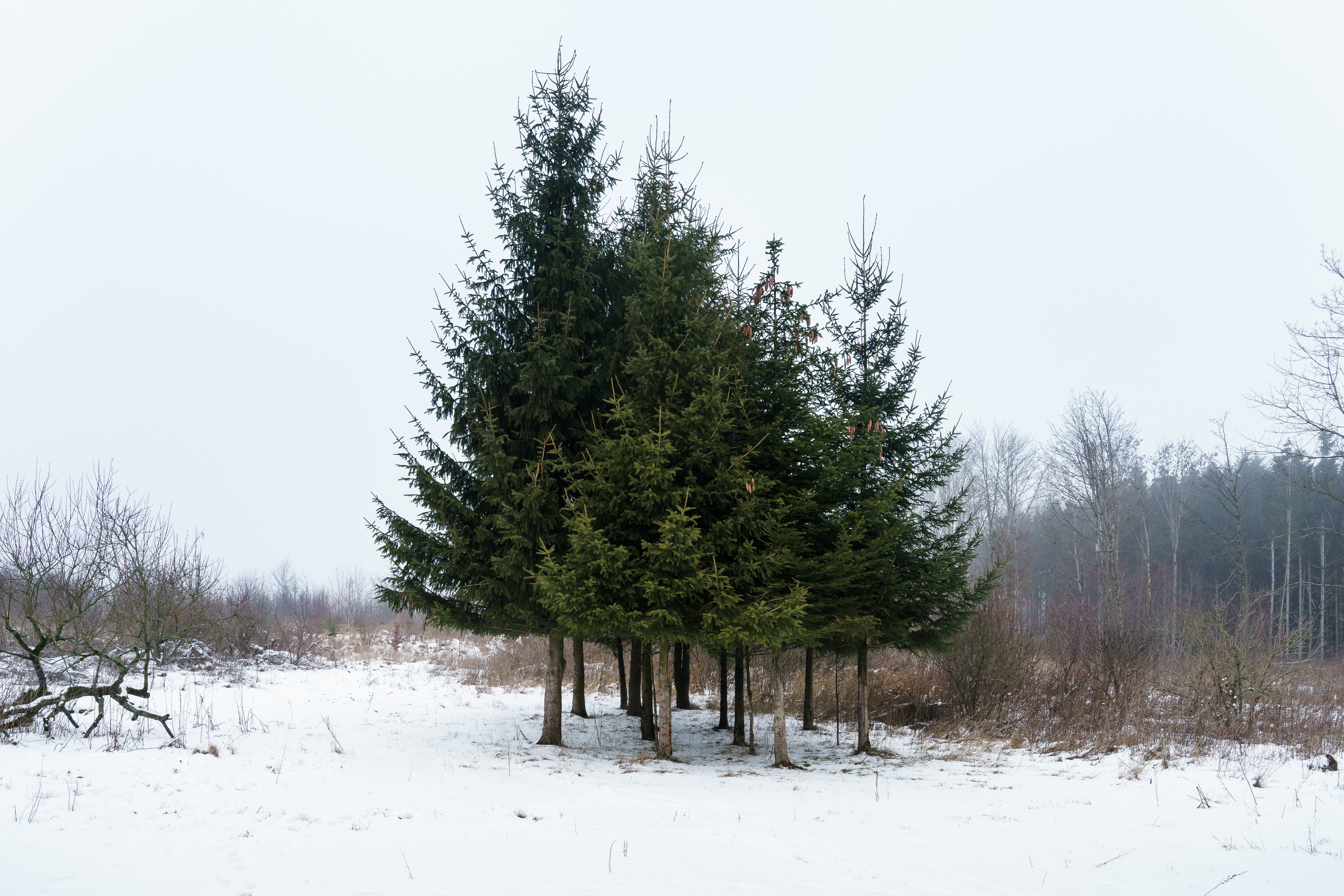
Young spruce group (Picea abies) marginal windthrow area twelve years after Kyrill / Vogelsberg, Germany

== See also ==
- Global storm activity of 2007
- January 2007 North American Ice Storm
