= Louis Abeille =

Louis Abeille may refer to:

- Louis Paul Abeille (1719–1807), French economist
- Ludwig Abeille (1761–1838), German pianist and composer
