= Sigmund Borgundvåg =

Norwegian naval architect

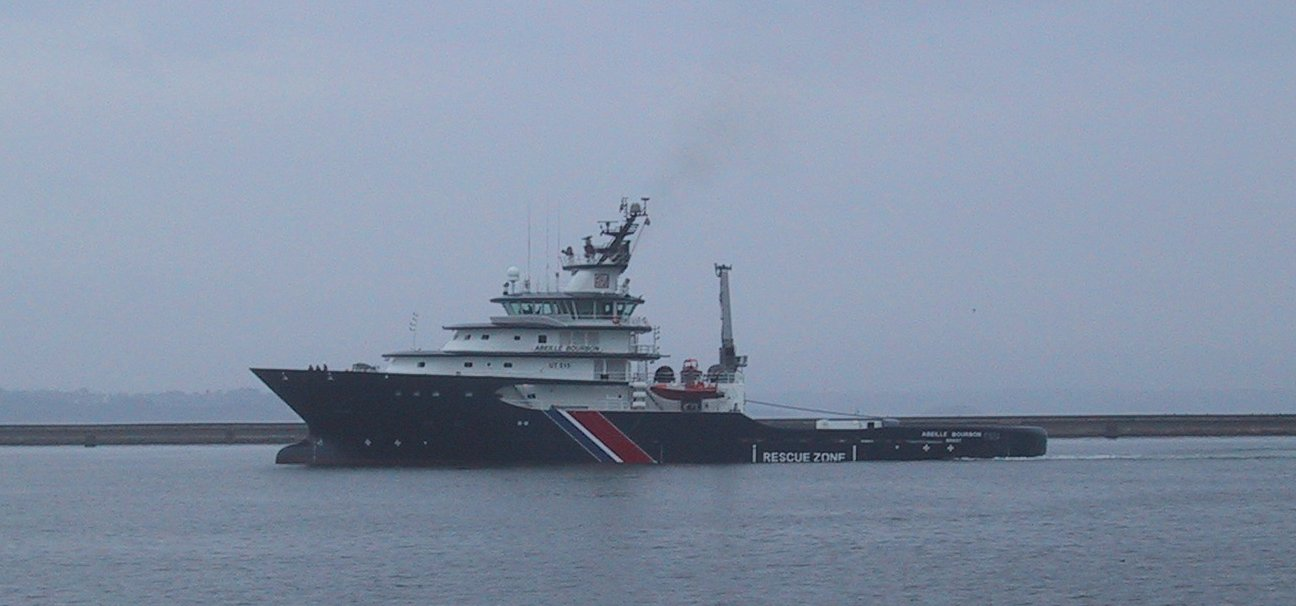
Abeille Bourbon at Brest

Sigmund Borgundvåg (born 16 February 1939, in Selje) is a Norwegian naval architect of offshore vessels including platform supply ships and deep-sea tugs.

== Biography ==
He worked as a naval architect for Ulstein Group (beginning in 1964) and then after its acquisition for Rolls-Royce, where he was chief naval architect from 1970 to 2006. In 1974 he designed one of the first Norwegian offshore supply ships. He is known for the concept of UT-Design, the basis of numerous off-shore vessels of varying sub-types. He was responsible for the construction of more than 600 vessels, of which 500 used UT-Design, including the Abeille Bourbon salvage tug.

He lives in Ulsteinvik.
