= MV YM Uranus =

History
- Name: YM Uranus
- Operator: V Ships
- Port of registry: (Malta) Valletta
- Builder: Marmara Shipyard
- Launched: 5 November 2008
- Identification: IMO number: 9452763; MMSI number: 249462000; Callsign: 9HSQ9

General characteristics
- Class & type: Chemical tanker
- Tonnage: 4,829 GT; 2,297 NT; 7,000 DWT
- Length: 119.10 m (390 ft 9 in) (overall); 111.60 m (366 ft 2 in) (between perpendiculars)
- Beam: 16.90 m (55 ft 5 in)
- Draught: 6.80 m (22 ft 4 in)
- Depth: 8.40 m (27 ft 7 in)
- Ice class: 1C
- Propulsion: MAN diesel engine
- Speed: 14 knots (26 km/h)
- Crew: 13

YM Uranus is a tanker registered under the Maltese flag. It was involved in a collision on 8 October 2010 off the coast of Brittany, France.

== Description ==
YM Uranus is 119.60 metres (392 ft 5 in) long overall, with a beam of 16.90 metres (55 ft 5 in) and a depth of 8.40 metres (27 ft 7 in), with a draught of 6.80 metres (22 ft 4 in). She is assessed as 4,829 GT, 2,297 NT and 7,000 DWT.

The ship is propelled by a 3,000 kilowatts (4,000 hp) MAN diesel engine which was built by STX Corporation of Korea. The engine has six cylinders of 32 centimetres (13 in) diameter by 40 centimetres (16 in) stroke. It drives a single screw propeller which can propel the ship at 14 knots (26 km/h).

== History ==
YM Uranus was built by Marmara Shipyards, Istanbul, Turkey. She was launched on 5 November 2008. Her port of registry is Valletta, Malta. YM Uranus is operated under the management of V Ships UK Ltd, Glasgow. At 03:27 UTC on 8 October 2010, YM Uranus was involved in a collision with the Panamanian bulk carrier Hanjin Rizhao, 50 nautical miles (93 km) south west of Ouessant off the Brittany coast. All 13 crew took to the lifeboats at around 03:30 UTC, from where they were rescued by a French helicopter and taken to Brest. The ship was taken under tow by French tug Abeille Bourbon. Making 4 knots (7.4 km/h), it took about 13 hours to reach Brest. YM Uranus was on a voyage from Porto Marghera, Italy to Amsterdam, Netherlands. Hanjin Rizhao was on a voyage from Las Palmas, Spain to Rotterdam, Netherlands.
