= MSC Napoli =

UK-flagged container ship (1991–2007)

History
- Name: MSC Napoli
- Owner: Metvale Limited
- Operator: Zodiac Maritime Agencies Ltd
- Port of registry: United Kingdom, London 1995-2007; France 1991-1995
- Builder: Samsung Heavy Industries; Geoje, South Korea
- Yard number: 1082
- Launched: 24 August 1991
- Out of service: January 2007
- Renamed: 2004-2007 MSC Napoli; 2001-2004 CMA CGM Normandie; 1995-2001 Nedlloyd Normandie; 1991-1995 CGM Normandie
- Identification: Call sign: VQBX7; DNV ID: 24568; IMO number: 9000601; MMSI no.: 235004790
- Fate: Damaged in storm on 18 January 2007; beached on 20 January 2007; broken up on 20 July 2007. Finally removed in July 2009.

General characteristics
- Tonnage: 53,409 GT; 21,088 NT; 62,277 DWT
- Length: 275.66 m (904.4 ft)
- Beam: 37.10 m (121.7 ft)
- Draught: 13.8 m (45 ft 3 in)
- Installed power: 34,480 KW
- Speed: 24 kn (44 km/h; 28 mph)
- Capacity: 4,734 TEU; 2,684 TEU on deck; 2,050 TEU below
- Crew: 31

MSC Napoli was a United Kingdom-flagged container ship that developed a hull breach due to rough seas and slamming in the English Channel on 18 January 2007. She was deliberately run aground at Lyme Bay to avoid an environmental disaster and broken up by salvors.

== Early history ==
The ship was built in 1991 and had a capacity of 4,419 TEU (62,000 tons). She was built by Samsung Heavy Industries, Kŏje, South Korea; owned by Metvale Ltd., a British Virgin Islands Brass Plate single entity company; managed by Zodiac Maritime; and was under charter to Mediterranean Shipping Company.

On 27 March 2001, then named CMA CGM Normandie, she was en route from Port Klang in Malaysia to the Indonesian capital, Jakarta when she ran aground on a reef in the Singapore Strait and remained stuck for several weeks. She was repaired by the Hyundai-Vinashin Shipyard in Khánh Hòa Province, Vietnam, which included the welding of more than 3,000 tonnes of metal onto the hull.

== Kyrill ==
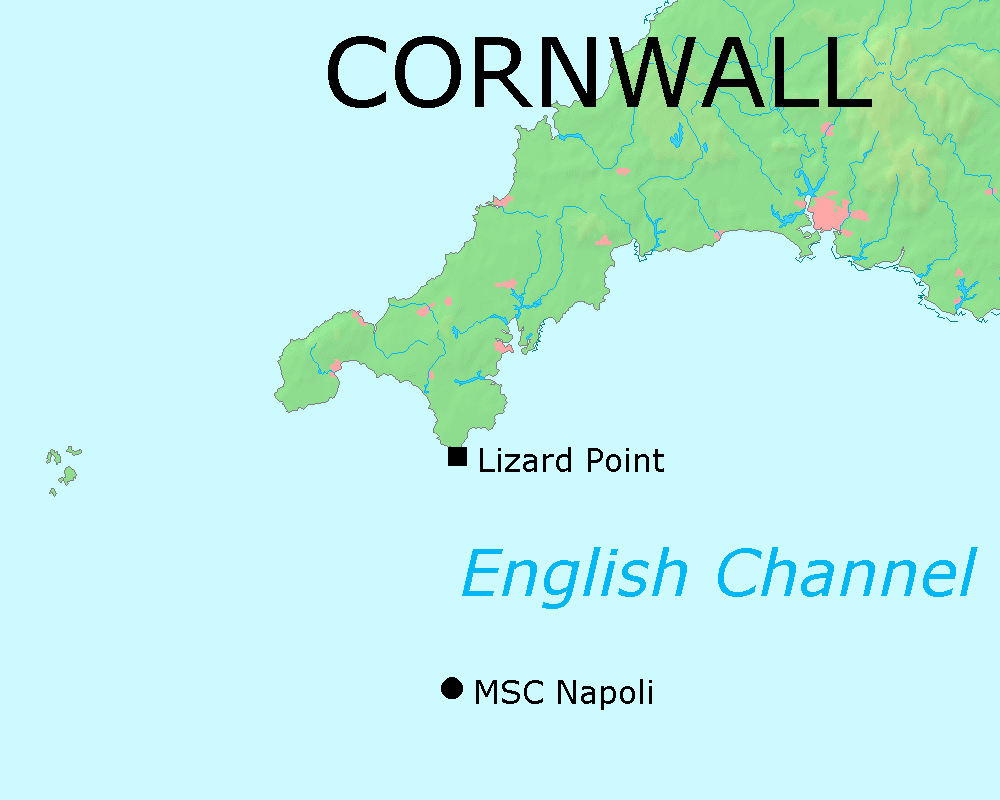
Position of MSC Napoli when she was abandoned

While en route from Belgium to Portugal on 18 January 2007, during European windstorm Kyrill, severe gale-force winds and huge waves caused serious damage to MSC Napoli's hull, including a crack in one side and a flooded engine room. The ship was then 50 miles (80 km) off the coast of The Lizard, Cornwall.

At approximately 10:30 UTC, the crew sent out a distress call. Not long afterwards, the captain ordered the crew to abandon ship into one of the lifeboats. They were out at sea for several hours before all 26 crew were picked up from their lifeboat by Sea King helicopters of the Royal Navy's Fleet Air Arm and taken to Royal Naval Air Station Culdrose in Cornwall. During the difficult rescue, one helicopter broke two winch lines, making it even harder to rescue the seamen. The rough seas and gale-force winds gave the men acute seasickness, and in some cases dehydration due to overheating.

== Beached at Lyme Bay ==
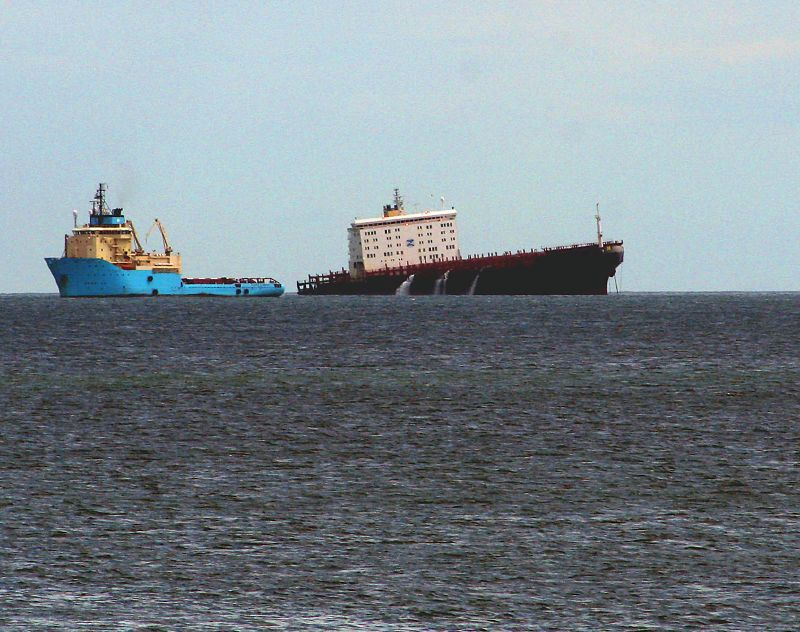
MSC Napoli beached off Branscombe with its containers removed.

On 19 January 2007, the ship was taken under tow by the salvage tug Abeille Bourbon, later joined by Abeille Liberté. The vessel was to be towed to Portland Harbour in Dorset, 140 miles (230 km) distant; the closer ports of Falmouth, Cornwall and Plymouth, Devon were rejected in addition to others in France, although the Falmouth harbour master Captain Mark Sansom said he had confirmed that MSC Napoli could have been accommodated in Falmouth Bay. Adrian Sanders, MP for the parliamentary constituency of Torbay raised questions about why MSC Napoli was not taken to Falmouth or France.

The flotilla proceeded up the English Channel; with MSC Napoli increasing its list and with strong winds forecast refuge was taken in Lyme Bay. Lyme Bay is sheltered from northwest, west and southwest winds, common at that time of year. The ship’s deteriorating condition raised doubts about its ability to withstand the rigours of the journey to Portland. Robin Middleton, the Secretary of State's Representative in Maritime Salvage and Intervention who was leading the MCA's salvage response team, decided to beach the ship in Lyme Bay. Middleton said that the environmental sensitivities in the Lyme Bay area were fully assessed before the decision to beach MSC Napoli was made. He said, "The beaching location was selected based on minimising the impact of any spillage and enabling salvage work to remove the vessel and cargo to take place. The local authorities and environmental groups have been notified and all agencies are working together to ensure that pollution is minimised”. Julian Wardlaw, who spoke for the Environment Group, an umbrella organisation for local green agencies, said Middleton had contacted it and asked where in Lyme Bay was the best place to beach MSC Napoli. Wardlaw said: "We told them: 'Nowhere in Lyme Bay'. It is too important an environment." However, at a subsequent public enquiry Wardlaw said he supported the decision to deliberately ground the stricken container ship off the East Devon coastline describing it as the ‘least worst option.’

The beaching location was at Branscombe around 1 mile (1.6 km) off the Devon coast, near the coastal town of Sidmouth on 20 January. This area of the coastline where MSC Napoli was beached is a part of Britain's first natural World Heritage Site, the Jurassic Coast. In winter Lyme Bay hosts large numbers of wintering sea birds whilst the sea bed was habitat for endangered species such as the pink sea fan and sunset cup coral.

Devon county councillor Stuart Hughes said, "So many questions need to be answered there has got to be a public enquiry". Brian Greenslade, leader of Devon County Council, confirmed that the council would be holding a public inquiry into the beaching. The move came amid questions about the decision to take MSC Napoli to an area of protected World Heritage Site coastline.

== Pollution risk ==
Of the 41,773 tonnes of cargo on board, "1,684 tonnes are of products classified as dangerous by the International Maritime Organization". 103 containers fell into the sea. Oil spilled 5 miles (8.0 km) to the north-east, which affected some sea birds. More than 420 were taken to the nearby West Hatch RSPCA Wildlife Centre, though most of the affected animals faced permanent injury or death. The specialised oil spill response vessel (French: bâtiment de soutien, d’assistance et de dépollution) BSAD Argonaute proceeded to the spill area with anti-pollution personnel and equipment.

== Scavenging ==
After containers from the wreck began washing up at Branscombe, around two hundred people went onto the beach to scavenge the flotsam, despite warnings from the police that those failing to notify the Receiver of Wreck of goods salvaged risked fines. Scavenged goods include 17 BMW R1200RT motorcycles, empty wine casks, nappies, perfume, and car parts. After initially tolerating a "salvage" free-for-all, by 23 January 2007 the police branded the activity of scavengers "despicable", closed the beach, and announced that they would use powers not used for 100 years under the Merchant Shipping Act 1854 to force people to return goods they had salvaged without informing the authorities, pointing out that under the Merchant Shipping Act 1995 such actions constituted an offence equivalent to theft. In October 2007, salvagers who had reported their finds to the Receiver of Wreck were told they could keep what they found.

== Salvage and cleanup operation ==
Over the course of the next week, from 22 January, an attempt to remove the oil and other hazardous materials from MSC Napoli was made. The oil was very viscous in cold weather and needed to be warmed up before it could be pumped onto the tugs. On 23 January 2007 further details of the forthcoming salvage operation of both the ship and its cargo were released. The main point of concern was the threat of an oil spill; some seabirds were already affected and recovered along the Jurassic Coast.

Aside from the main salvage operation of MSC Napoli, a local salvage firm was appointed to clear up the beach and remove the containers and flotsam. The earlier scavenging of the washed-up containers and cargo created a difference of opinion among people, some claiming it made the cleanup of the beach harder as wreckers forced open some sealed containers and sifted through the contents, leaving the unwanted items strewn across the beach. Others claimed that removing the flotsam contributed to the cleanup of Branscombe beach.

Items from MSC Napoli began to make landfall all along the south coast of England as far east as the Isle of Wight.

The issue of wrecking or collecting the flotsam from the beach caused much discussion and gained media attention as the locals and the authorities became more concerned at the level of scavenging taking place from Branscombe beach and elsewhere along the coast. Eventually, the Maritime and Coastguard Agency invoked powers under the Merchant Shipping Act 1995. The agency said people taking goods would now be asked to deliver the items to the acting Receiver of Wreck on the beach. This effectively meant that no further items could legally be removed from the beach.

Following this announcement, and for safety reasons whilst the beach cleanup operation got under way, the Police (Devon and Cornwall Constabulary) together with the support of the National Trust (the owners of the beach) and the coastguard set up road blocks to close the beach. At the same time the salvage firm erected fences on the beach to prevent public access.

== Breaking-up of wreck ==
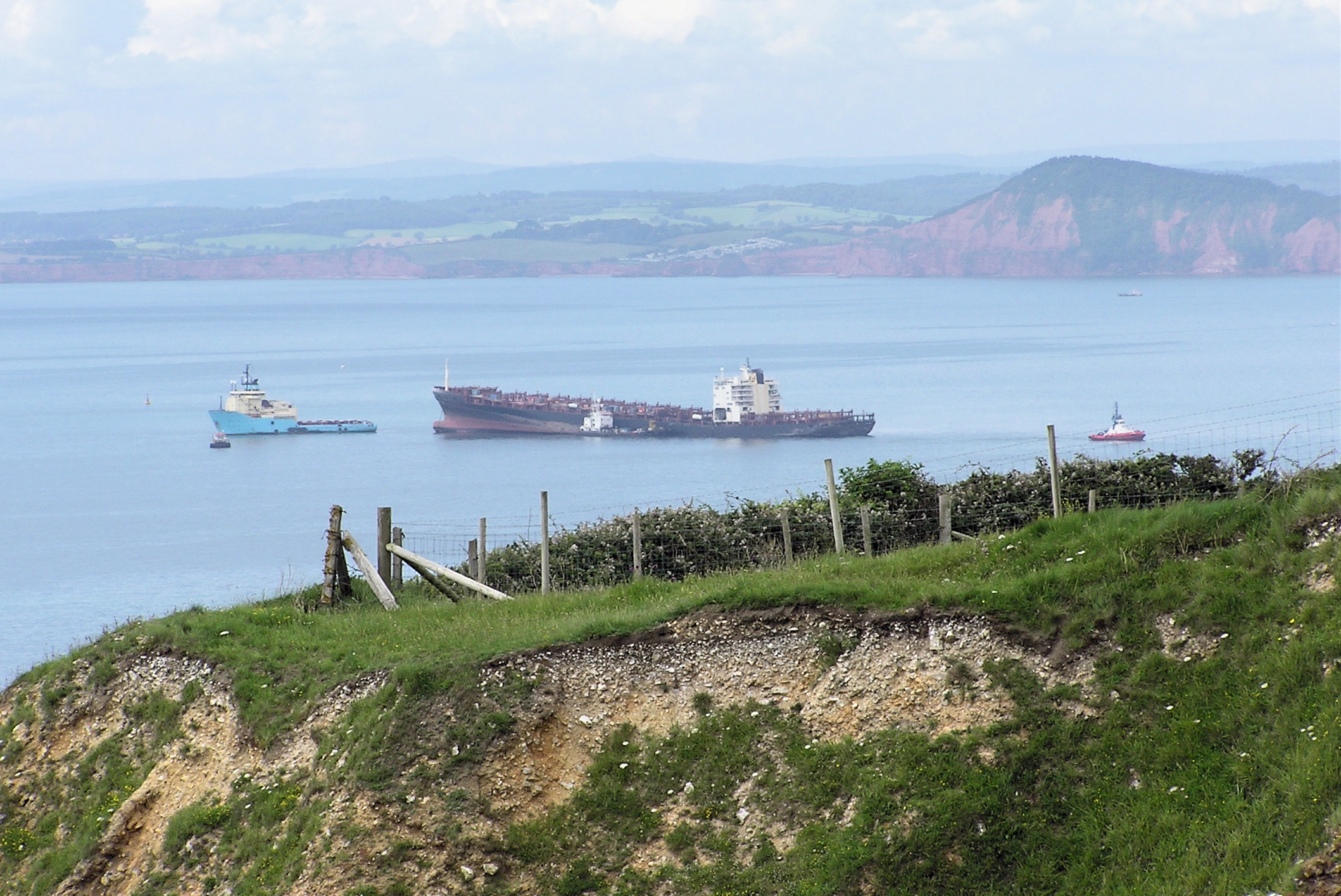
MSC Napoli on 20 July 2007, seen from the cliffs between Beer and Branscombe.

On 9 July 2007 MSC Napoli was refloated, but was re-beached on 12 July as a crack measuring 3 metres (9.8 ft) was found in the vessel's hull, running down both sides and through the keel. The decision was made to break the ship up near Branscombe beach; this was attempted using explosives after a previous attempt to use the spring tides failed to break the ship apart.

With MSC Napoli remaining in one piece a first controlled explosion blew holes in the deck plating in order to expose the structural beams below using shaped charges with a second cutting punch charge timed 50 milliseconds later than the first. That job successfully exposed the beams, so more charges were planted across the beams which were ultimately severed. With only her deck plates on the main deck holding the vessel together around the bridge structure of the vessel, two tugs at either end of the ship tried to pull the ship apart.

On 20 July 2007 a third controlled explosion finally split the ship in two.

== Disposal ==
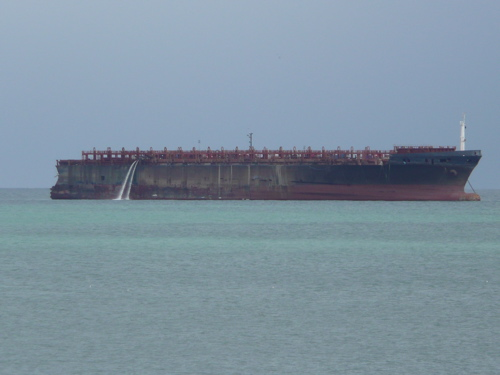
Bow section of MSC Napoli in Belfast Lough on 16 August 2007

In August 2007 the bow section of the ship's hull was taken to the Harland and Wolff shipyard in Belfast, Northern Ireland for disposal and recycling. HM Coastguard placed a 500 metres (1,600 ft) exclusion zone around the wreckage while it was anchored in Belfast Lough, while awaiting entry to the yard.

A plan to tow the stern section as well to Harland and Wolff was abandoned in March 2008 in favour of cutting it up in situ in the English Channel and removing the pieces. Work started in May 2008. Following a parbuckling operation to correct the stern's list and trim, work completed in July 2009.

The 13,500 kilograms (29,800 lb) anchor from the vessel was presented to the people of Branscombe and East Devon by the ship's owners Metvale Ltd and was unveiled at Branscombe Mouth on 16 July 2008.

== Investigation and report ==
The Marine Accident Investigation Branch conducted an investigation into the accident, and a report on the investigation was published at the end of April 2008. Det Norske Veritas, the classification society responsible for the ship, also submitted its report at the same time. The accident was found to be the result of structural failure of the vessel hull skin and girders at the interface between the transverse stiffening of the engine room and the longitudinal stiffening of the cargo area. This was due to the loading on the structure due to the ship, containers and the rare sea state exceeding the capacity of the hull girders in this area. No deficiencies were found in material or construction and the earlier grounding in 2001 did not contribute to the loss.

== Legacy ==
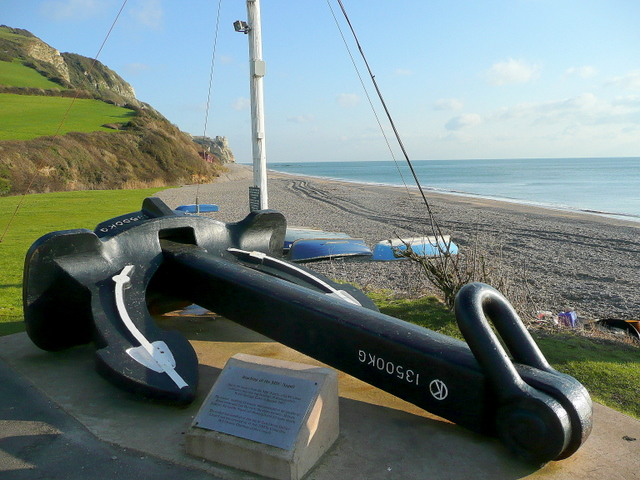
The anchor of MSC Napoli at Branscombe, 2009

The 2009 album Arrogance Ignorance and Greed by West Country folk duo Show of Hands features the track "The Napoli" which comments on the subsequent looting of the wreckage. A Doctor Who episode, titled "The Power of Three", was partially inspired by the story of MSC Napoli.

One of the BMW motorcycles salvaged from the wreck became part of a 2018 public artwork by Christian Kosmas Mayer, sited on the bank of the River Danube in Austria.
