= Ievoli Sun =

Chemical tanker

History
- Name: Ievoli Sun
- Builder: Esercizio Cantieri
- Completed: 1989
- Identification: IMO number: 8708634
- Fate: Sank on 31 October 2000

General characteristics
- Type: Chemical tanker
- Tonnage: 4,189 GT; 7,308 DWT
- Length: 115.65 m (379 ft 5 in)
- Beam: 17.51 m (57 ft 5 in)
- Draught: 6.29 m (20 ft 8 in)
- Speed: 13.8 knots (25.6 km/h; 15.9 mph)
- Crew: 14

Ievoli Sun was a chemical tanker chartered by Napolitan ship-owner Domenico Ievoli. On 31 October 2000, she sank at 49°52′00″N 02°24′00″W, approximately nine nautical miles (17 km; 10 mi) off the Casquets in the English Channel, with a 6,000-ton load, including 4,000 tons of styrene, 1,000 tons of methyl ethyl ketone and 1,000 tons of isopropyl alcohol.

== History ==
The wreckage was caused by bad weather, and water intake at the bow, which filled the forward storage area and the bow thruster bay. The increase in weight caused a negative pitch, which worsened while more compartments filled.

A distress call was received by the CROSS at 04:30. At 07:17, a Super Frelon of the French Navy departed to evacuate the 14-man crew of the tanker, amid 65-knot (120 km/h; 75 mph) winds. An hour later, the helicopter arrived on the scene, and evacuated the crew in 40 minutes. The tugboat Abeille Flandre arrived and started tugging the tanker at four knots (7.4 km/h; 4.6 mph) toward Normandy.

The next day in the morning, Ievoli Sun sank. The D'Estienne d'Orves-class aviso Lieutenant de vaisseau Lavallée and the Tripartite-class minehunter Céphée were sent on the scene to reinforce Abeille Flandre and monitor pollution. Only small traces of chemicals were noticed.
