= Gaspard Abeille =

French poet (1648–1718)

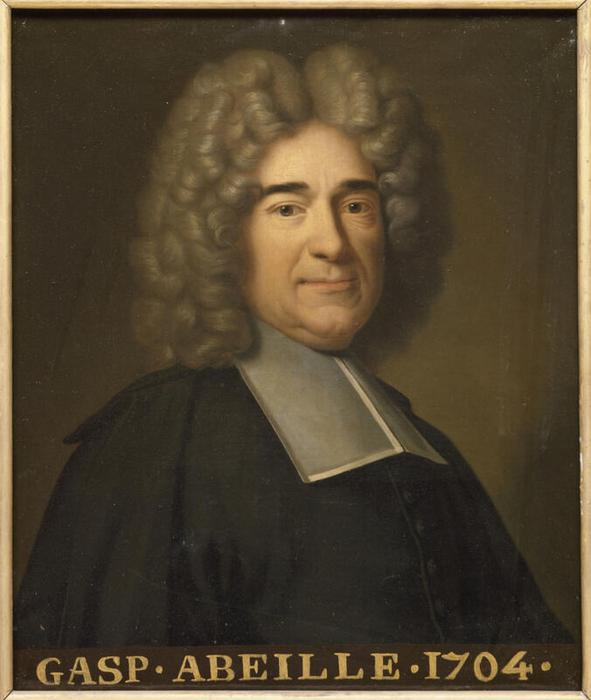
Abeille portrait, anonymous artist, circa 1704

Gaspard Abeille (French pronunciation: [ɡaspaʁ abɛj]; Riez, 1648 – Paris, 22 May 1718) was a French lyric and tragic poetry poet. He received the title of Abbé and in 1704 was elected a member of the Académie française. His brother Scipion was also a poet and a surgeon.

== Biography ==
He came to Paris as a young man, and was Duke of Piney-Luxembourg, the List of counts and dukes of Vendôme and the Prince de Conti. L'abbé Abeille,” writes Jean le Rond d'Alembert, ‘was admitted to this brilliant society, and made a name for himself by the pleasures of his wit, by his natural gaiety, by jokes to which he knew how to give a piquant form, and yet measured enough never to leave the bounds of circumspection and decency’. He wrote tragedies, first under his own name, then [When?], because he was criticized for lacking the dignity of his ecclesiastical state, under the name of the actor La Thuillerie, who played the lead role in several of his plays. His Coriolan ran for almost twenty performances, bringing him to the attention of Pierre Corneille and Jean Racine. But his tragedy Lyncée was a failure, and nasty epigrams were circulated about its author.

A member of the Académie d'Arles since 1670, he became a member of the Académie Française in 1704. He presented verse odes and epistles at public sessions of the Académie, but these were judged to be just as mediocre as his plays. D'Alembert nevertheless paid him this tribute: “Benevolent and disinterested, he never used his credit except to oblige those who had recourse to him; all who suffered had a right to his heart; and although his position offered him frequent opportunities to increase his fortune, he died in that honest mediocrity which gives so much lustre to virtue.”

He was the brother of Scipion Abeille, who was born in Riez and died in Paris on December 9, 1697. He was a poet, but his main interest was in the art of healing, and he wrote a number of works.

== Plays ==
- Argélie, reine de Thessalie, five-act tragedy, in verse, Paris, Théâtre de l'Hôtel de Bourgogne, novembre 1673
- Coriolan, five-act tragedy, in verse, Paris, Théâtre de l'Hôtel Guénégaud, 24 janvier 1676
- Lyncée, five-act tragedy, in verse, Paris, Théâtre de l'Hôtel de Bourgogne, 25 février 1678
- Soliman, five-act tragedy, in verse, Paris, Théâtre de l'Hôtel de Bourgogne, 11 octobre 1680
- Crispin bel esprit, one-act comedy, in verse, Paris, Théâtre de l'Hôtel Guénégaud, 11 juillet 1681
- Hercule, five-act tragedy, in verse, Paris, Théâtre de l'Hôtel Guénégaud, 7 novembre 1681
