= Scipion Abeille =

French surgeon and poet

Scipion Abeille (French pronunciation: [sipjɔ̃ abɛj]; died 9 December 1697) was a French surgeon and poet.

Abeille was born at Riez in the French province Provence, (now in Alpes-de-Haute-Provence), and was the brother of Gaspard Abeille.

Abeille's most famous work was Histoire des Os ("Description of the Bones"), which was published in 1685. He also wrote Le parfait chirurgien d'armée, le traité des playes d'arquebusade, le chapitre singulier tiré de Guidon, l'anatomie de la teste, Paris, 1696.
