= Abeille Flandre =

French emergency tow vessel

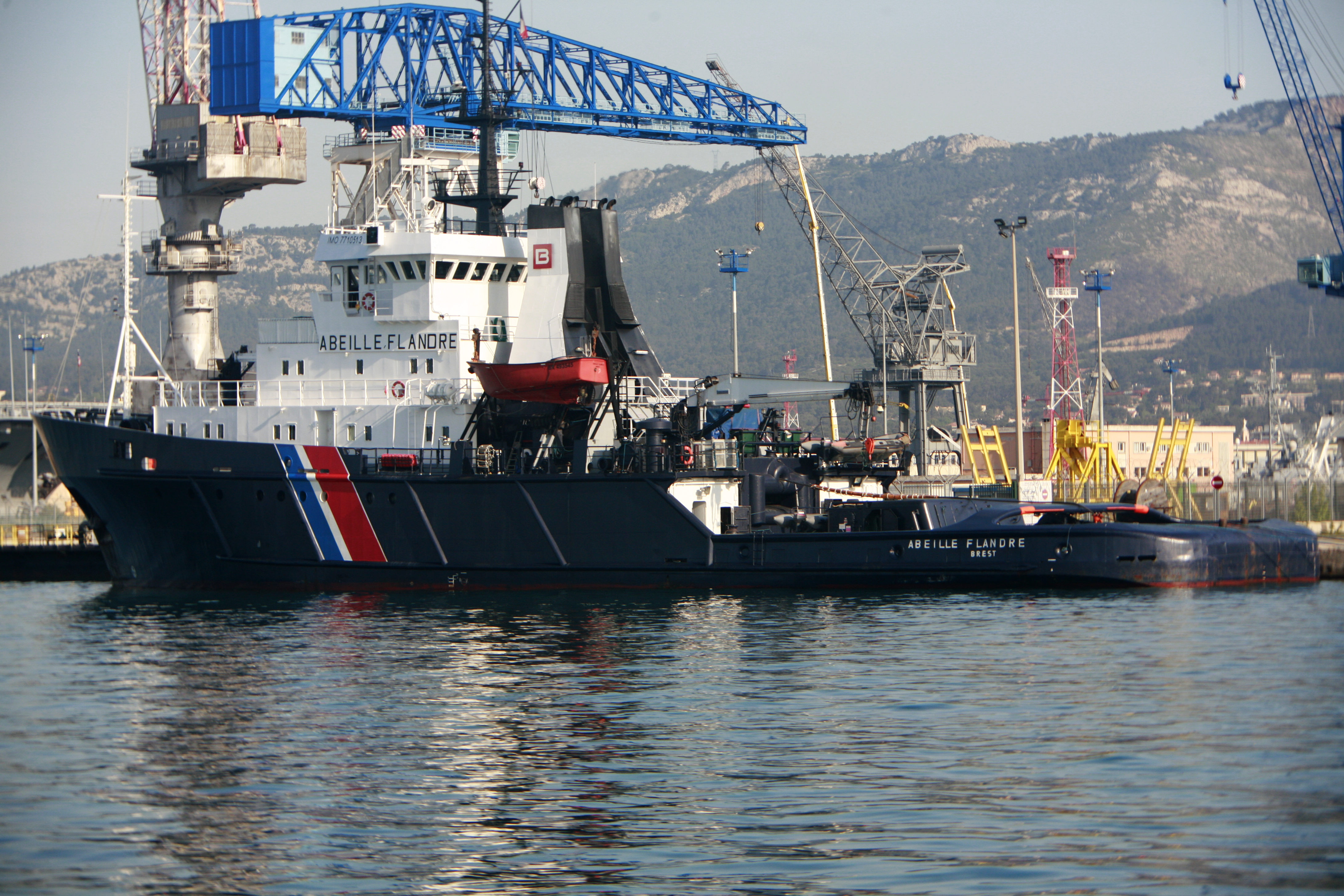
- Abeille Flandre

History

France
- Name: Abeille Flandre
- Owner: Abeilles International
- Operator: French Navy
- Port of registry: Brest
- Builder: Ulstein Hatlø A/S
- Yard number: 157
- Commissioned: 1978
- Decommissioned: 30 September 2022
- Home port: Toulon
- Identification: IMO number: 7710513; MMSI number: 227067000; Callsign: FNPB
- Fate: Scrapped in Brest, 2023

General characteristics
- Tonnage: 2,220 tonnes
- Length: 63.45 m (208.2 ft)
- Beam: 14.74 m (48.4 ft)
- Draught: 6.90 m (22.6 ft)
- Propulsion: 4 Atlas-MaK K 8 M453 AK diesels, 4 × 2,350 kilowatts (3,150 hp)
- Speed: 17 knots (31 km/h; 20 mph)
- Crew: 10
- Sensors & processing systems: 2 Racal Decca radars

The Abeille Flandre (French pronunciation: [abɛj flɑ̃dʁ]) was an ocean tug, in service with the French Navy from December 1979 until 2022. She was owned by the French private company Abeilles International.

== History ==
She was based at Toulon on the Mediterranean coast. Before she was replaced by Abeille Bourbon, she was based at Brest, where she assisted maritime traffic off the coast of Brittany. She was able to go to sea at 20 minutes' notice, and would also go to sea whenever winds in excess of 25 knots (46 km/h) were recorded at Ouessant. She was replaced on this station in April 2005 by the more powerful, 80-metre Abeille Bourbon.

French rescue tugs on government contracts operate under the authority of a préfet maritime. If a salvage is successful, the French state earns half the value of the salvaged cargo. When the vessel is not required for government service, its operator can request the préfet to release it to perform private salvage and rescue missions. Rates for private salvages are negotiated on a case-by-case basis. Fees are never charged to rescue people.

Following her salvage role in the sinkings of the Erika and the Ievoli Sun, the Abeille Flandre gained recognition and public popularity in France. Hervé Hamon's book L'Abeille d'Ouessant is a homage to the ship.

== Livery ==
The Abeille Flandre's livery includes the angled blue-white-red stripes of a French ship in public service. She was featured in the Discovery Channel documentary Wild and Angry Seas, released in August 2003.

== Retirement ==
In the autumn of 2022, the Abeille Flandre returned to the port of Brest in order to be dismantled by the Breton company Navaléo. Scrapping commenced on 25 August 2023, the propeller and part of the stern were saved for the city of Brest. They are on display at Quai Malbert, its former home.
