= Abeille Bretagne =

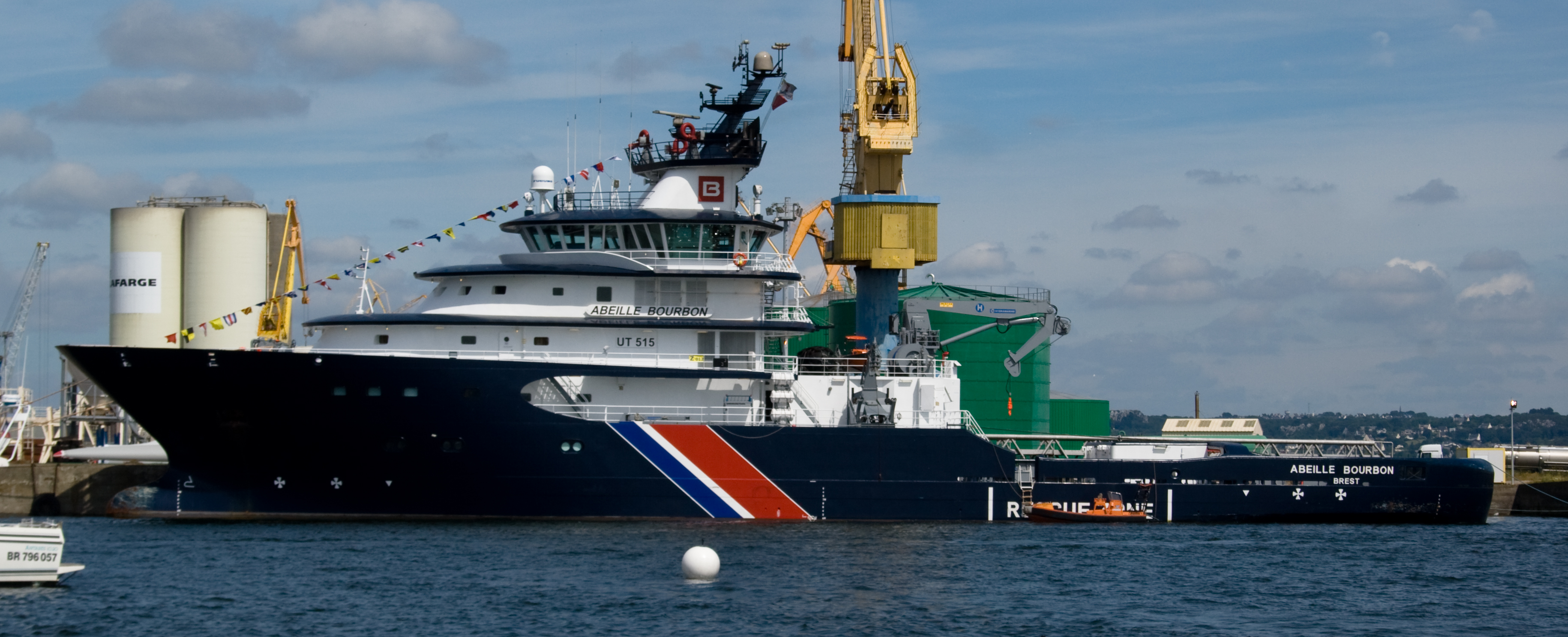
- Abeille Bourbon (now Abeille Bretagne) at Brest, France

History

France
- Name: Abeille Bourbon
- Owner: Boluda Towage Europe
- Builder: Myklebust Verft AS, Gursken, Norway
- Yard number: 39
- Sponsored by: Jacques de Chateauvieux
- Christened: Bernadette Chirac, 13 April 2005, as Abeille Bourbon
- Renamed: May 2025, to Abeille Bretagne
- Home port: Brest, France
- Identification: Call sign: FZTC; IMO number: 9308687; MMSI number: 226263000
- Status: Active

General characteristics
- Type: Salvage tug
- Tonnage: 3,249 GT; 974 NT; 1,813 DWT
- Length: 80 m (262.5 ft)
- Beam: 16.5 m (54.1 ft)
- Draught: 6 m (19.7 ft)
- Propulsion: Main engine: 4 × 4,000 kW (5,400 hp); Auxiliary engine: 3 × 615 kW (825 hp); Bow thruster: 2 × 883 kW (1,184 hp); Stern thruster: 2 × 515 kW (691 hp)
- Speed: approx 19.8 knots (36.7 km/h; 22.8 mph)
- Crew: 12

Abeille Bretagne is a high seas emergency tow vessel (salvage tug), 80 metres (260 ft) long with a tractive power of 200 tonnes-force (2.0 MN), a crew of 12, designed by Norwegian naval architect Sigmund Borgundvåg. She was originally christened Abeille Bourbon (French pronunciation: [abɛj buʁbɔ̃]), by Bernadette Chirac on 13 April 2005 in the presence of sponsor Jacques de Chateauvieux. She is based in Brest, France.

Abeille Bourbon was owned by Abeilles International, a unit of Groupe Bourbon. She has been chartered to the French government since 2005 and can be called upon by the Maritime Prefect of Brest at any time. She was commissioned to replace the older Abeille Flandre, which was reassigned to the French Mediterranean coast. In 2024, the Spanish group Boluda Towage acquired Abeilles International resulting in the name change for the ship in the following year.

Abeille Bretagne is a sister ship of Abeille Liberté. Abeille means bee in French. Tow vessels are traditionally named according to their activities around the ships they assist; in this case, like a bee around a flower.

== Notable operations ==
- Towing Modern Express, in 2016;
- Lightening Rokia Delmas in October 2006
- Towing MSC Napoli in January 2007
- Towing YM Uranus in October 2010

== Gallery ==
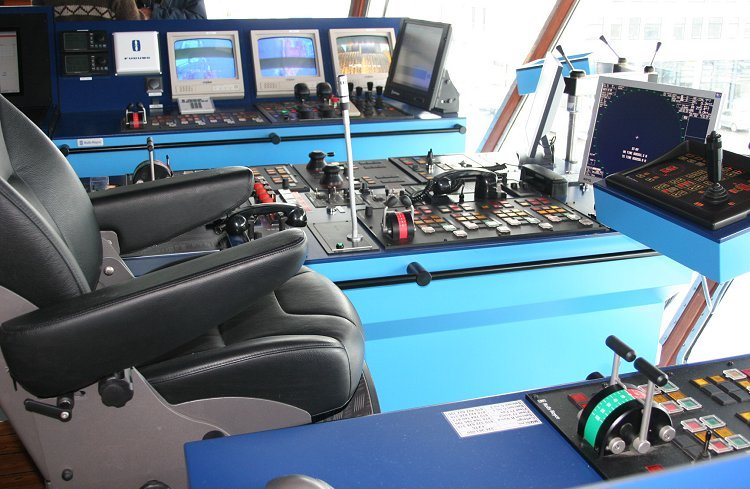
Bridge of Abeille Bourbon

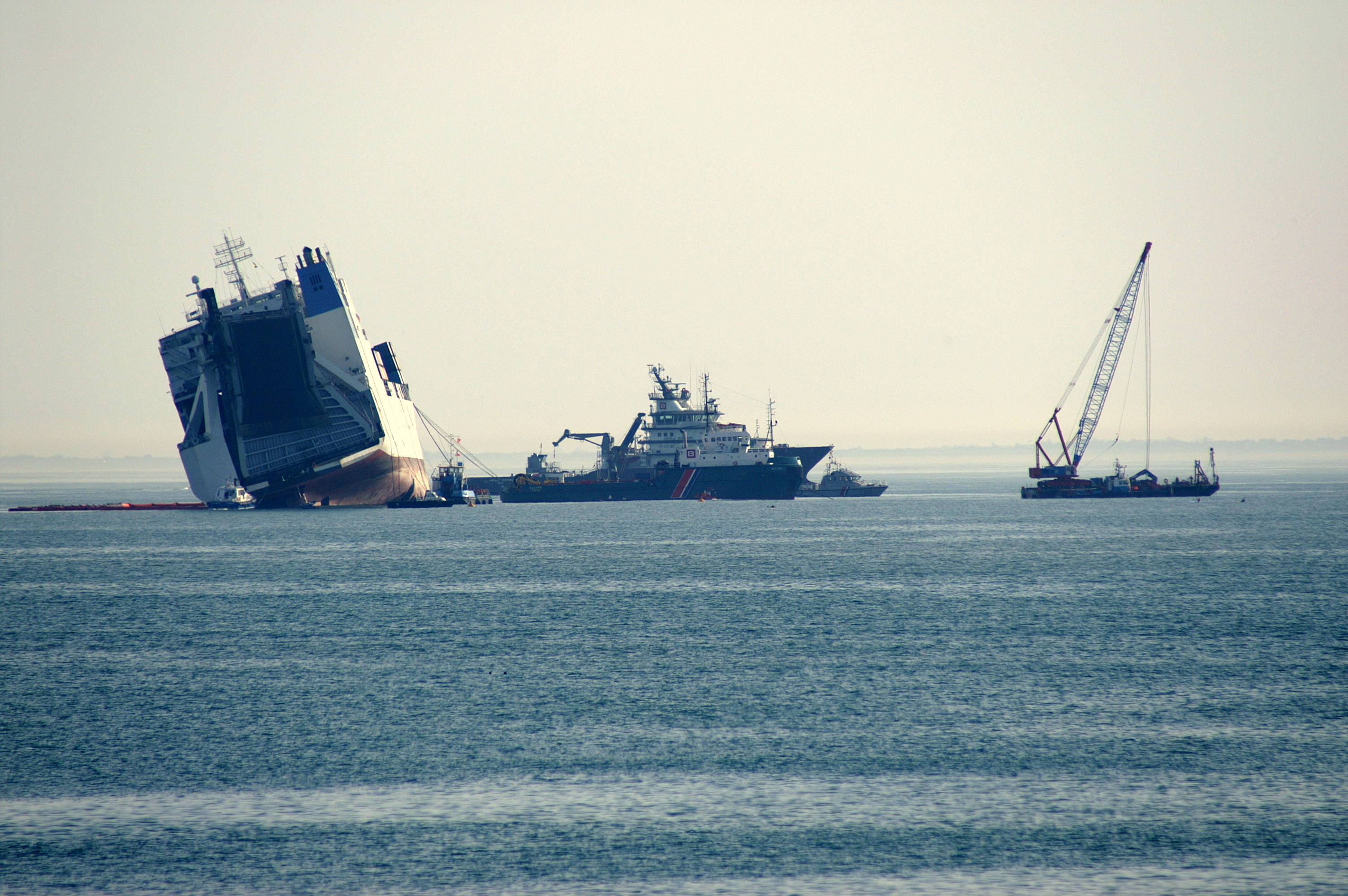
Towing the Panama-registered ConRo Rokia Delmas near the Île de Ré in 2006

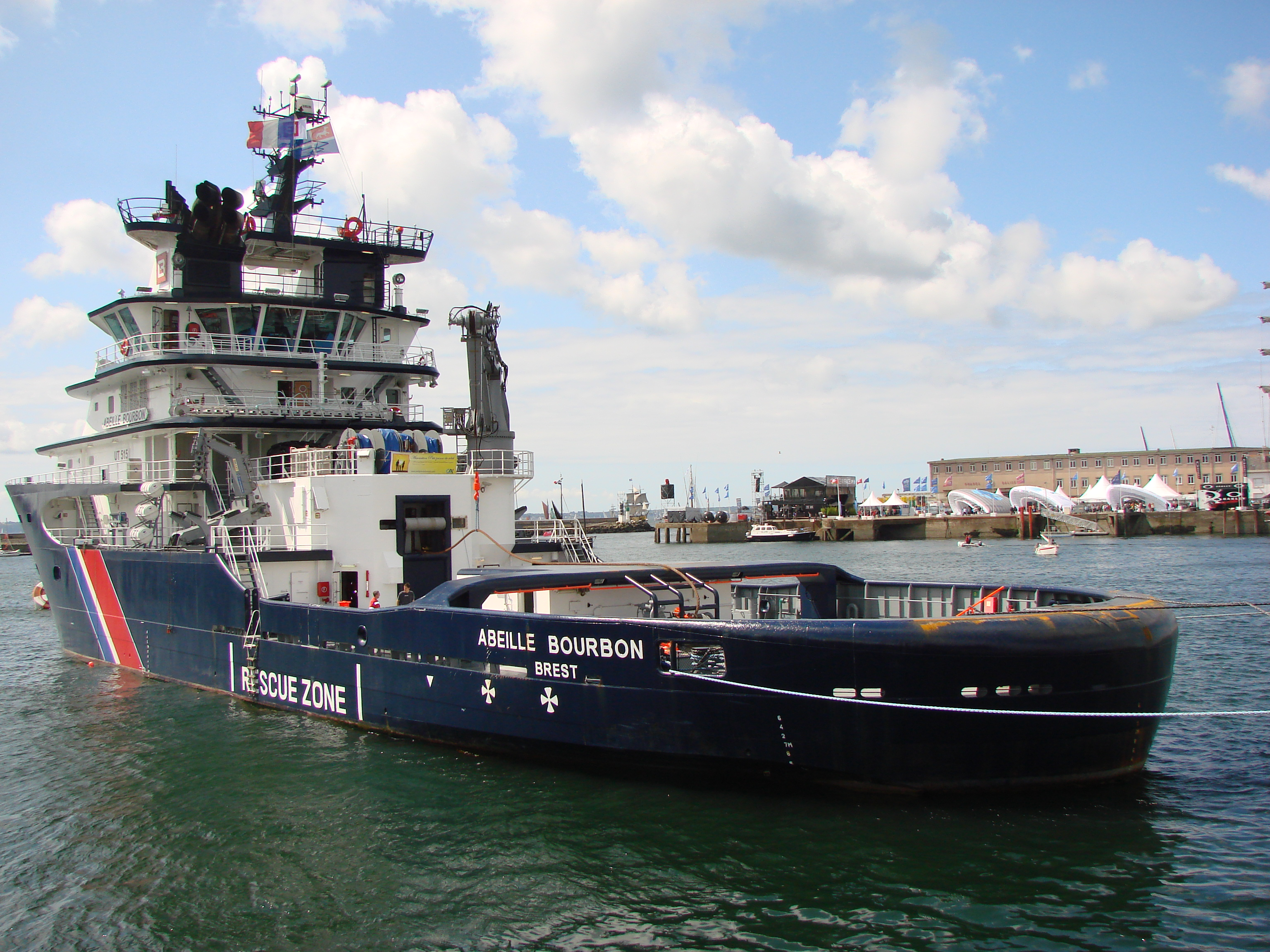
Abeille Bourbon in Brest during Les Tonnerres de Brest 2012.
