= Lesnica (Slovakia) =

- Municipality
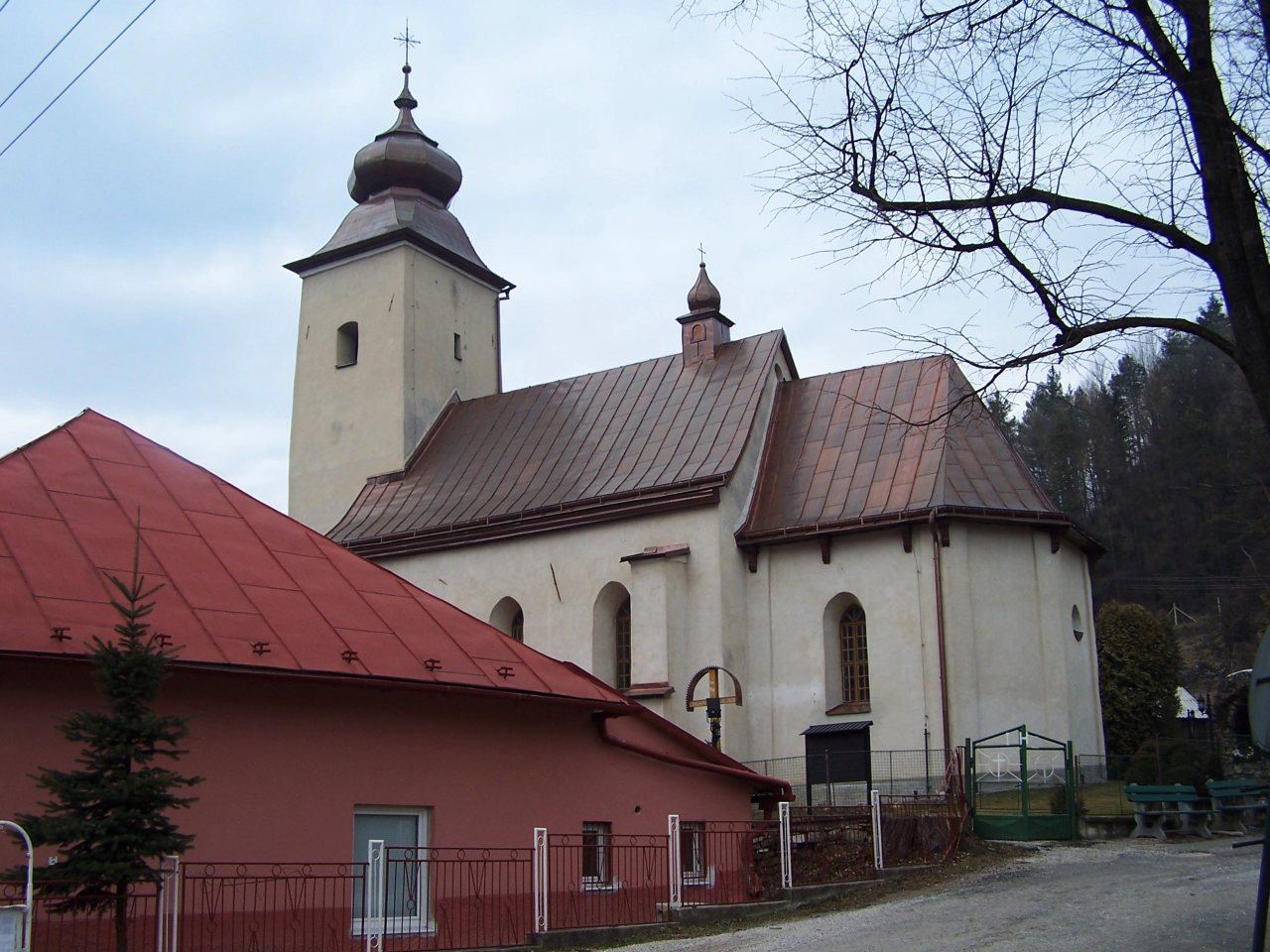

- Flag

- Location of Lesnica in the Prešov Region Location of Lesnica in Slovakia
- Coordinates: 49.40°N 20.47°E
- Country: Slovakia
- Region: Prešov Region
- District: Stará Ľubovňa District
- First mentioned: 1297

Area
  - Total: 14.57 km^{2} (5.63 sq mi)
- Elevation: 490 m (1,610 ft)

Population (2025)
  - Total: 490
- Time zone: UTC+1 (CET)
  - Summer (DST): UTC+2 (CEST)
- Postal code: 653 3
- Area code: +421 52
- Vehicle registration plate (until 2022): SL
- Website: lesnica.eu

Lesnica (Hungarian: Erdős, until 1899: Lesnicz, German: Leschnitz) is a large village and municipality in the Stará Ľubovňa District in the Prešov Region of northern Slovakia.

== History ==
In historical records the village was first mentioned in 1297. Before the establishment of independent Czechoslovakia in 1918, Lesnica was part of Szepes County within the Kingdom of Hungary. From 1939 to 1945, it was part of the Slovak Republic. On 25 January 1945, the Red Army dislodged the Wehrmacht from Lesnica and it was once again part of Czechoslovakia.

== Geography ==
The municipality lies at an altitude of 490 metres (1,610 ft) and covers an area of 14.57 km^{2} (5.63 sq mi) (2025).

== Population ==
Population statistic (10 years)
Year	1995	2005	2015	2025
Count	483	541	498	490
Difference		+12.00%	−7.94%	−1.60%

Population statistic
Year	2024	2025
Count	494	490
Difference		−0.80%

It has a population of 490 people (31 December 2025).

=== Ethnicity ===
Census 2021 (1+ %)
Ethnicity	Number	Fraction
Slovak	482	98.77%
Not found out	116	23.77%
Total	488	

In year 2021 was 488 people by ethnicity 482 as Slovak, 116 as Not found out, 2 as Rusyn, 2 as Polish, 1 as Czech, 1 as German and 1 as Hungarian.

Note on population: The difference values of population numbers in the table "Population statistic" and in the sections "Ethnicity" & "Religion" is caused by the use of various statistical methods.

=== Religion ===
Census 2021 (1+ %)
Religion	Number	Fraction
Roman Catholic Church	479	98.16%
Not found out	5	1.02%
Total	488	

In year 2021 was 488 people by religion 479 from Roman Catholic Church, 5 from Not found out, 3 from None and 1 from Eastern Orthodox Church.
