= Abeille Liberté =

Ship built in 2005

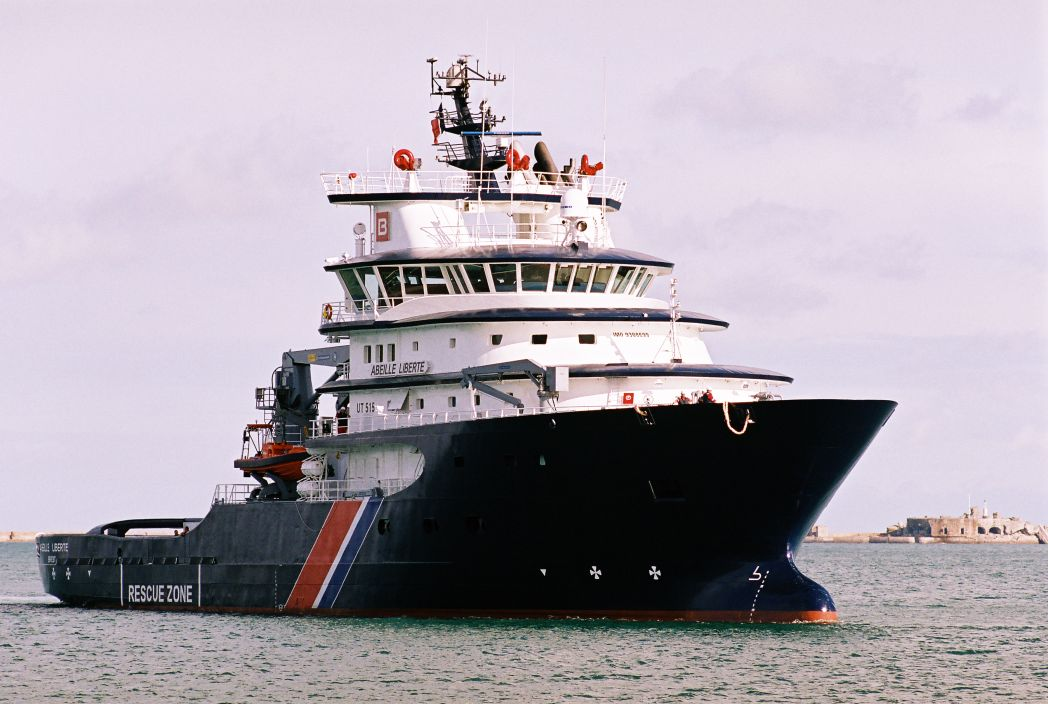
- The Abeille Liberté arriving at Cherbourg

History

France
- Owner: GIE Abeille Bourbon, Marseilles, France (Groupe Bourbon)
- Operator: Les Abeilles International, Le Havre, France (Groupe Bourbon)
- Builder: Myklebust Verft AS, Gursken, Norway
- Yard number: 40
- Christened: Annie Blanchet, 17 November 2005
- Home port: Cherbourg Harbour, France
- Identification: Call sign: FMDI; IMO number: 9308699; MMSI number: 226265000
- Status: Active

General characteristics
- Type: Rolls-Royce Marine "UT 515" - Multi Purpose Salvage Tug / Coast Guard and Stand By Safety Vessel
- Tonnage: 3,249 GT, 974 NT, 1,811 DWT
- Length: 80 m (262 ft 6 in)
- Beam: 16.5 m (54 ft 2 in)
- Draught: 6 m (19 ft 8 in)
- Propulsion: Main engine: 4 × 4,000 kW (5,400 hp); Auxiliary engine: 3 × 615 kW (825 hp); Bow thruster: 2 × 883 kW (1,184 hp); Stern thruster: 2 × 515 kW (691 hp)
- Speed: approx 19.9 knots (36.9 km/h; 22.9 mph)
- Crew: 12

Abeille Liberté (French pronunciation: [abɛj libɛʁte]) is an emergency tow vessel (salvage tug) based in Cherbourg Harbour, France. It is a sister ship of Abeille Bourbon. It was built at the Myklebust Verft shipyard in Gursken, Norway, which is part of the Kleven Maritime group. It was delivered in October 2005 and officially inaugurated on 17 November 2005.

Abeille Liberté is owned by Abeilles International, a unit of Groupe Bourbon. The crew is made up of sailors of the merchant marine. It is chartered to the French government and can be called upon by the Maritime Prefect of the English Channel and North Sea at any time.

== Notable operations ==
It was one of two French tugs called upon to tow the damaged container ship MSC Napoli in January 2007.

In March 2018, the Abeille Liberté was one of several vessels which towed the cargo ship Britannica Hav to the Port of Le Havre after it collided with a Belgian fishing vessel.
