= Pierre-César Abeille =

French composer

Pierre-César Abeille (French pronunciation: [pjɛʁ sezaʁ abɛj]; 1674 - after 1733) was a French composer. Born in the Salon-de-Provence of southern France, he was baptized on 24 February 1674. He was the son of Jean Abeille, a royal notary.

From 1699 to 1700, Abeille was maître de chapelle of the primate's Church of St. Trophime, Arles. When he was succeeded by Fançois Pétouille, he was vicaire de choeur and maitre de musique at the royal parish church of Saint-Germain l'Auxerrois in Paris.

== Music ==
Abeille's best known work is the two volume set Psalms of David, dedicated to Madame de Maintenon. It is a set of 150 psalms that alternate among airs, duets, and ritornellos. The pieces are generally performed in a concertante style.
