= Louis Paul Abeille =

French economist

Louis Paul Abeille FRS
- Born: 3 June 1719
- Died: 28 July 1807 (aged 88); Paris, France
- Occupation: Economist

Louis Paul Abeille FRS (French pronunciation: [lwi pɔl abɛj]; 3 June 1719 – 28 July 1807 Paris) was a French economist.

He was Inspector General of Manufactures and Commerce in 1765, and secretary of commerce from 1769 to 1783, when he was replaced by his son, Jean Louis.

He was also a member of the Agricultural Society of Paris.

== Works ==
- Réflexions sur la police des grains en France et en Angleterre, 1764
- Principes sur la liberté du commerce des grains, Desaint, 1768
- Faits qui ont influé sur la cherté des grains en France et en Angleterre, 1768
- Observations de la société royale d'agriculture, sur l'uniformité des poids et mesures, Louis-Paul Abeille, Mathieu Tillet, 1790
