= United Kingdom's emergency towing vessel fleet =

National ships for towing disabled vessels

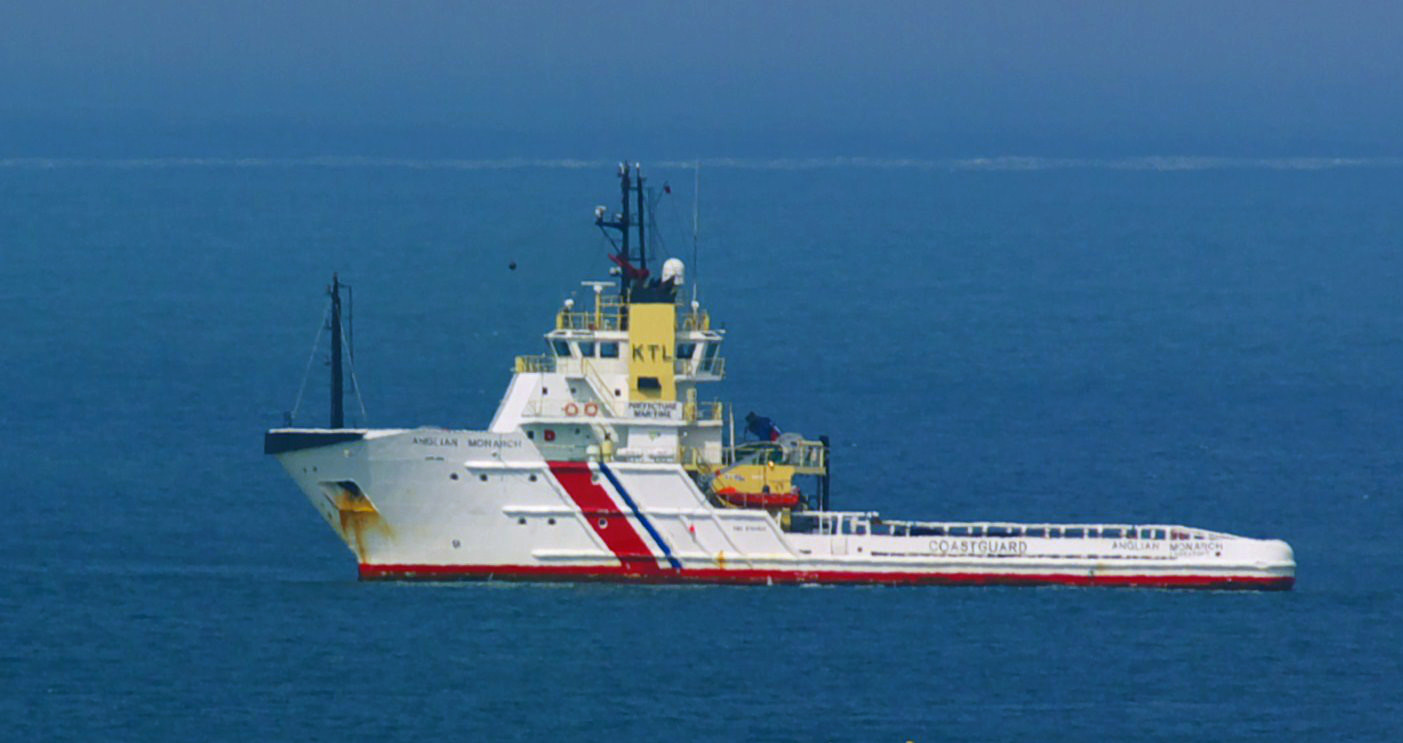
ETV Anglian Monarch

The United Kingdom's emergency towing vessel fleet were a maintained fleet of emergency tow vessels (ETV) from 1993 through 2011. The vessels were privately owned and operated for Her Majesty's Coastguard. Four vessels were stationed around the UK coastline, while a fifth was held in reserve.

== History ==
The first vessels of the UK's ETV fleet were introduced in 1994 following the recommendations of Lord Donaldson's report 'Safer Ships, Cleaner Seas' published in May 1994 following the MV Braer oil spill of off the coast of Shetland, Scotland. Klyne Tugs Ltd of Lowestoft took over the ETV contract in 1999, and in February 2001 signed an eight-year contract to own and operate a four ETV vessel fleet, which in 2006 was extended by two years, to run until September 2011. Sovereign, entering service in 2003, and here near identical Princess, entering service in 2002, were both built for Kline's in China, being sailed to Britain to join Monarch and Prince. Monarch was built in 1999 in Japan.

Klyne Tugs was taken over in 2007 by the JP Knight Group, Britain’s oldest tug and barge company, becoming JP Knight (Lowestoft) Ltd. The tugs wear the red and white livery of the MCA, with the black and white funnel colours of JP Knight.

In 2010, the Government announced as part of the Department for Transport's share of cuts in the Comprehensive Spending Review, that the ETV fleet would be no longer be funded by the MCA from September 2011, saving £32.5m over the Spending Review period. The Department stated that "state provision of ETVs does not represent a correct use of taxpayers money and that ship salvage should be a commercial matter between a ship's operator and the salvor".

Two days after the announcement that the fleet was to be disbanded, Anglian Prince was sent to the aid of the UK's newest nuclear submarine HMS Astute, which ran aground off the Isle of Skye in Scotland during sea trials.

As part of the spending review, it was also announced that the status of the Maritime Incident Response Group (MIRG), comprising specialist teams of firefighters formed in 2006 from fifteen UK Fire and Rescue Services set up to respond to incidents at sea, would be reviewed, stating that "ships' crews are trained in basic firefighting techniques and there is little evidence that MIRG has changed the outcome of ship fires", and had not been involved in any significant incidents in its existence. A full cessation of the MIRG would save the Department £340,000 annually.

On 30 September 2011 it was announced that the two ETVs operating in the Minch and the Shetland Islands received a moratorium of three months with an interim funding by the United Kingdom's government.

== Fleet ==
As of 2010, four ETVs, Anglian Prince, Anglian Princess, Anglian Sovereign and Anglian Monarch, were based in strategic locations around the UK, with two covering the south coast of England, at Falmouth in Cornwall and Dover in Kent, and two in Scottish waters, at Stornoway the Western Isles (the Outer Hebrides), and Lerwick in the Northern Isles (Shetland and Orkney). The four strong ETV fleet is intended to be operational 24 hours a day 365 days a year and maintained at 30 minutes readiness to sail, with one tug allocated to each of the four operating areas on a rotational basis, worked around maintenance schedules. The Dover station is funded jointly with French maritime authorities.

Monarch, Sovereign and Prince are purpose built offshore tugs, while Prince is a converted salvage tug. A fifth tug, the Anglian Earl, is an anchorhandling and salvage tug regularly used on commercial work, but also fits the ETV criteria, and acts as cover for any of the four ETV stations as and when required.

The bollard pull capability of the fleet is as follows:

- Anglian Monarch: 152 tonnes
- Anglian Prince: 170 t
- Anglian Princess: over 180 t
- Anglian Sovereign: over 180 t

ETV vessels can be temporarily relieved of station duties as required, such as when Prince was despatched on a four-day voyage to come to the aid of the Canadian submarine HMCS Chicoutimi, stranded in the Atlantic after a fire broke out during a delivery voyage from Scotland to Canada. In that instance, Prince was contracted commercially by the Royal Navy, with another ETV capable vessel quickly arranged to take her place in Stornoway.
