= Nordic (tug) =

German emergency tow vessel

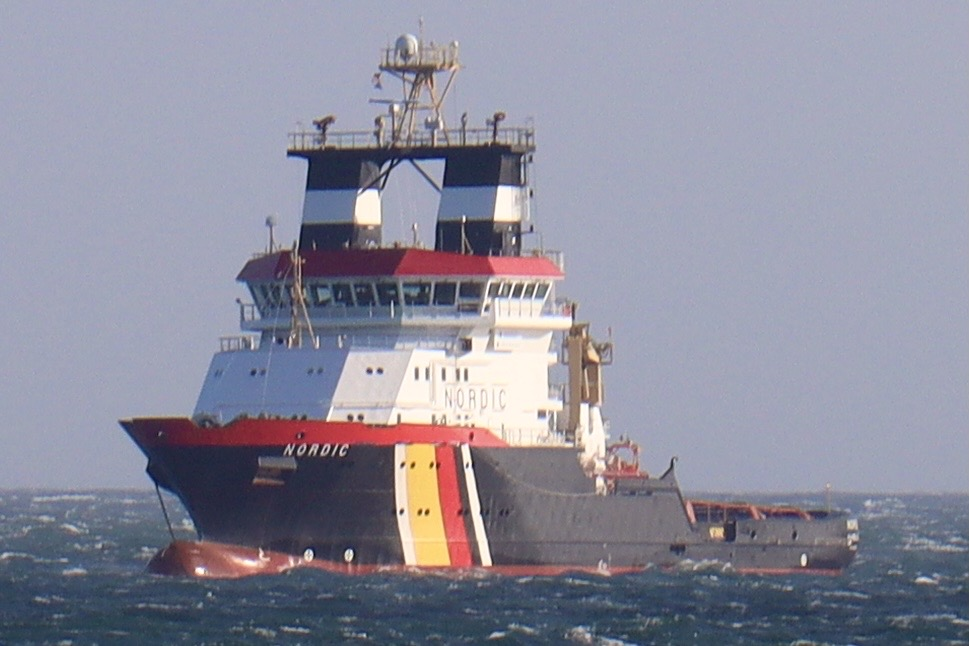
- Nordic 2020

History

Germany
- Name: Nordic
- Owner: NORTUG Bereederungs GmbH & Co. KG
- Operator: Fairplay, formerly Bugsier-, Reederei- und Bergungsgesellschaft
- Builder: P+S Werften, Wolgast, Germany
- Cost: ca. € 50 mil.
- Yard number: 563
- Launched: 2 June 2010
- Christened: 8 December 2010
- Completed: 15 November 2010
- Commissioned: 1 January 2011
- Home port: Hamburg
- Identification: IMO number: 9525962; MMSI number: 211574000; Call sign: DIBL
- Status: Active

General characteristics
- Tonnage: 3,374 GT
- Length: 78 m (256 ft) (overall)
- Beam: 16.4 m (54 ft)
- Draught: max. 6.6 m (22 ft)
- Installed power: 2 × MTU 20V8000M71L, 8,600 kW
- Propulsion: 2 × controllable-pitch propeller in a Kort nozzle
- Speed: 19.9 knots (36.9 km/h; 22.9 mph)
- Complement: 12 crew + 4 boarding team
- Sensors & processing systems: Radar

The Nordic is a German emergency tow vessel (ETV) stationed on an offshore position north of the East Frisian island of Norderney on halfway to Heligoland. It is the most powerful tugboat in German waters, operated by Fairplay Towage Group.

== History ==
=== Construction and commissioning ===
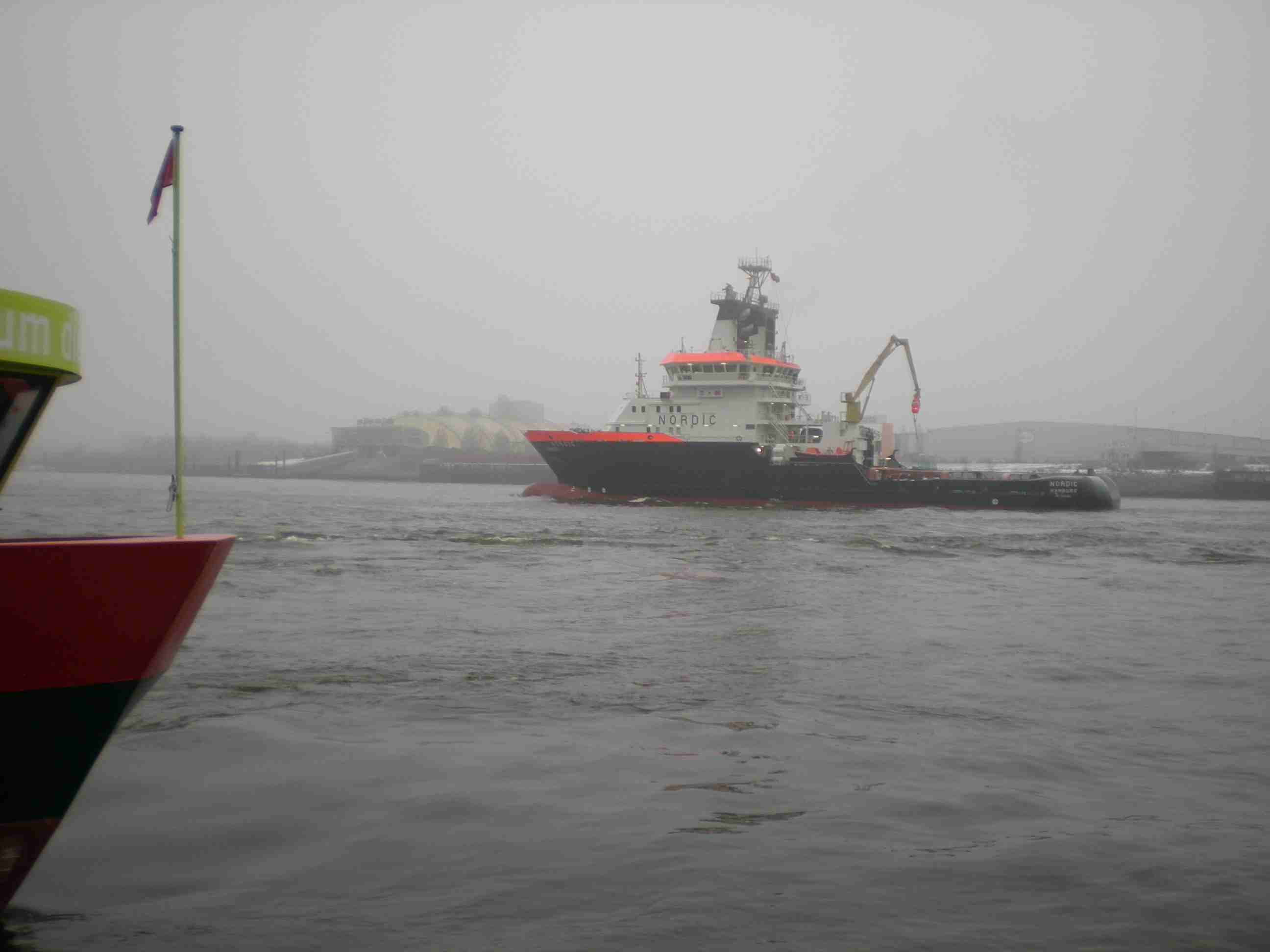
Emergency tow vessel Nordic entering the port of Hamburg on 7 December 2010 after its transfer from Wolgast

The construction and commissioning of the Nordic were a consequence of the Pallas accident off Amrum island in 1998 when the cargo vessel ran aground and lost a substantial amount of oil. Especially the Schutzgemeinschaft Deutsche Nordsee association and many other non-governmental organisations for the protection of the environment had worked towards the commissioning of a new emergency tow vessel on the German North Sea coast.

Constructions began on 27 October 2009 on the P+S Werften yards, formerly known as Peene-Werft, in Wolgast, Mecklenburg-Western Pomerania, with yard number 563. Sea trials were held in October 2010. In the course of these trials, the Nordic delivered a bollard pull of 207 tons (ca. 2,030 kN). After its completion on 15 November 2010 and the christening on 8 December 2010 by Susanne Ramsauer, the wife of Federal German Minister of Transport Peter Ramsauer, the ship replaced the salvage tug Oceanic which was decommissioned after 41 years in service on New Year's Day 2011. Unofficially, the construction costs of the Nordic were said to have been about € 50 million.

=== Operation ===
The Nordic is owned by NORTUG Bereederungs GmbH & Co. KG which is partially held by the members of the German consortium Arbeitsgemeinschaft Küstenschutz. The ship is operated by Fairplay (after merger with the former operatior Bugsier-, Reederei- und Bergungsgesellschaft) who charter the tow vessel to the Federal Ministry of Transport, Building and Urban Development for an initial time of ten years and a fee of €114 million. The operational base is Cuxhaven on the mouth of the river Elbe. With a maximum speed of 19.9 knots (36.9 km/h; 22.9 mph) the Nordic is able to reach any stricken vessel in German North Sea waters within two hours.

In order to be able to operate in a contaminated atmosphere, the ship has been fitted with superstructures that can be sealed tight and are explosion-proof.

The crew of 16 includes a four people boarding team. In addition, up to 10 ship’s mechanic trainees and a training officer can be taken on board. Every three weeks the two regular crews take turns at the homeport Cuxhaven and take provisions, fuel etc. on board for the next three-weeks of readiness at sea.

In 2017, the Nordic was deployed to the “Glory Amsterdam” accident. The Chinese captain of the damaged ship initially did not recognize the Nordic as an emergency vehicle of the Federal Republic of Germany. In 2019 the ship was given a black, red and gold identification on the side.

== Engine and propulsion ==
The ship is fitted with two MTU 20V8000M71L plants in an anti-gas operational mode, two MTU 12V4000 auxiliary engines for driving the two main electrical generators and another Diesel engine by MAN which powers the emergency generator.

The Nordic has been prepared to operate in a flammable or harmful atmosphere, e.g. after a tanker accident. Among other safety measures, such cases involve the shutting down of the turbochargers so that compressed air inside them may not be ignited. However, this reduces the engine power. A seawater cooling of the exhaust system reduces the temperature of the exhaust fumes to 135 °C (275 °F).

The propulsion is diesel-mechanical via a gearbox and shaft device by Flender AG onto two controllable-pitch propellers by Berg Propulsion which are mounted inside Kort nozzle frames.

== Fairplay Towage ==
Fairplay Towage is a towing shipping company headquartered in Hamburg. It is also the parent company of the Fairplay Towage Group, which is active in several European countries through subsidiaries and investments. The Fairplay Group includes, among others, the Hamburg shipyard Theodor Buschmann GmbH & Co. (ship repairs and special steel construction for the offshore industry), the Rostock-based BBB Schlepp- und Hafendienst GmbH (port and short-sea towing services) and Borchard Schiffahrts GmbH (administration of real estate). The former main competitor, the Bugsier shipping company, has been part of the group since 2017.

The Baltic the main emergency tuck boat of the German Baltic Fleet was built at the Spanish Astilleros Armon dockyard in Vigo and is also owned and operated by Faiplay.

== See also ==
- Baltic, the Nordic's equivalent in the Baltic Sea.
