= Max Neuburger =

Max Neuburger (1928)

Max Neuburger (8 December 1868 in Vienna – 15 March 1955 in Vienna) was an Austrian physician and historian of medicine.

Born in Vienna on 8 December 1868, he "descended from Jewish families which had long been resident in Munich and Hamburg", his father, a linguist, moving out of Munich and becoming an Austrian subject in 1859, while his mother, an invalid, prompted the young Max to become a doctor, the future historian of medicine, during his youth, being well-versed in Greek, Latin and German literature, and particularly fond of philosophy.

In 1893 he received his medical doctorate at the University of Vienna, followed by clinical training at the Rudolfspital and work as an assistant to neurologist Moritz Benedikt at the Allgemeinen Poliklinik. In 1898 he qualified as a lecturer at the university under the supervision of Theodor Puschmann, who was also an important influence to his career. In 1917 he became a full professor in the field of history of medicine. Because of Nazi persecution, he emigrated to London in 1939, where he worked at the Wellcome Historical Medical Museum. In 1948 he moved to Buffalo, New York, to live with his son, and several years later returned to Vienna, where he died in 1955.

From 1901, in collaboration with Julius Leopold Pagel, he produced a revision of Puschmann's textbook on the history of medicine. He also published his own "Geschichte der Medizin", an acclaimed two volume work on the history of medicine of ancient and medieval times. In 1919, at the Josephinum in Vienna, he established a history of medicine institute (Instituts für Geschichte der Medizin) with an impressive library and museum that grew in importance during the ensuing years.

== Selected works ==
- Historische Entwicklung der experimentellen Gehirn- und Rückenmarksphysiologie vor Flourens, 1897; edited and translated into English by Edwin Clarke with the title "The historical development of experimental brain and spinal cord physiology before Flourens", 1981.
- Handbuch der Geschichte der Medizin, (original author Theodor Puschmann, edited with Julius Leopold Pagel); 3 volumes, 1901–06 – Handbook of the history of medicine.
- Abhandlungen zur Geschichte der Medicin (with Karl Sudhoff, Hugo Magnus), 1902 – Essays on the history of medicine.
- Schillers Beziehungen zur Medizin, 1905 – Friedrich Schiller's relationship with medicine.
- Geschichte der Medizin (2 volumes, 1906–11); translated into English by Ernest Playfair and published as "History of medicine" 1910–15.
- Die Medizin im Flavius Josephus, 1919 – The medicine of Flavius Josephus.
- Hermann Nothnagel, Leben und Wirken eines deutschen Klinikers, 1922 – Hermann Nothnagel, life and work of a German clinician.
- British Medicine and the Vienna School; Contacts and Parallels, 1943.
- "British and German Psychiatry in the Second Half of the Eighteenth and the Early Nineteenth Century", Bulletin of the History of Medicine. 18 (2): 121–145. ISSN 0007-5140. 1945.

== Bibliography ==
- Arturo Castiglioni, "Omaggio a Max Neuburger"(in Italian), Rivista di Storia delle Scienze Mediche e Naturali, Anno XXXIX, n. 2 (Luglio-Dicembre 1948), pp. 121-127
