= Hugo Magnus =

Hugo Magnus (31 May 1842 in Neumarkt in Schlesien – 15 April 1907 in Breslau) was a German ophthalmologist and historian of medicine. He was of Jewish ancestry.

He studied medicine at the University of Breslau, where he was a pupil of Albrecht Theodor Middeldorpf and Hermann Lebert. In 1867 he received his medical doctorate, and in 1873 qualified as a lecturer in ophthalmology. In 1883 he became an associate professor at the University of Breslau.

He is remembered for his intensive studies of color blindness and color sense. He also conducted research of eye diseases; in 1874 he made an early observation of what would be later known as Von Hippel–Lindau syndrome, and in 1878 he provided an early clinical description of proptosis in infantile scurvy. He was the author of numerous works with history of medicine themes (including ophthalmology).

== Selected works ==
- Das Auge in seinen ästhetischen und cultur-geschichtlichen Beziehungen, 1876 – The eye in its aesthetic and cultural-historical relationships.
- Die geschichtliche Entwickelung des Farbensinnes, 1877 – The historical development of color perception.
- Die Anatomie des Auges bei den Griechen und Römern, 1878 – The anatomy of the eye in reference to the Greeks and Romans.
- Die Farbenblindheit; ihr Wesen und ihre Bedeutung, dargestellt für Behörden, praktische Aerzte, Bahnärzte, Lehrer, 1878 – treatise on color blindness.
- Untersuchungen über den Farbensinn der Naturvölker, 1880 – Studies involving the color sense of primitive peoples.
- Die Augenheilkunde der Alten, 1901 – translated into English by Richey L. Waugh, Jr. in 1998 as "Ophthalmology of the ancients".
- Die methodische Erziehung des Farbensinnes, 1902 – Methodical education involving color perception.
- Abhandlungen zur Geschichte der Medicin (with Karl Sudhoff, Max Neuburger), 1902 – Essays on the history of medicine.
- Medicin und religion in ihren gegenseitigen beziehungen; geschichtliche untersuchungen, 1902 – Medicine and religion in their mutual relationships; historical analysis.
- "Visual economics, with rules for estimation of the earning ability after injuries to the eyes", 1902 (published in English, with Henry Würdemann).
- Kritik der medicinischen Erkenntnis; eine medicin-geschichtliche Untersuchung, 1904 – Review of medical knowledge; a history of medicine investigation.
- Die volksmedizin, ihre geschichtliche entwickelung und ihre beziehungen zur kultur, 1905 – Folk medicine, its historical development and its relationship to culture.
- Der Aberglauben in der Medicin; translated into English, edited by Julius L. Salinger as "Superstition in medicine", 1905.
