= Maritime Rescue Coordination Centre Bremen =

German air-sea rescue authority

Maritime Rescue Coordination Centre Bremen (MRCC Bremen)

MRCC overview
- Formed: 1982
- Jurisdiction: Marine Rescue Coordination Centre Bremen
- Headquarters: Free Hanseatic City of Bremen, North-Germany; 53°04′15″N 8°48′26″E
- Parent department: German Maritime Search and Rescue Service (DGzRS)

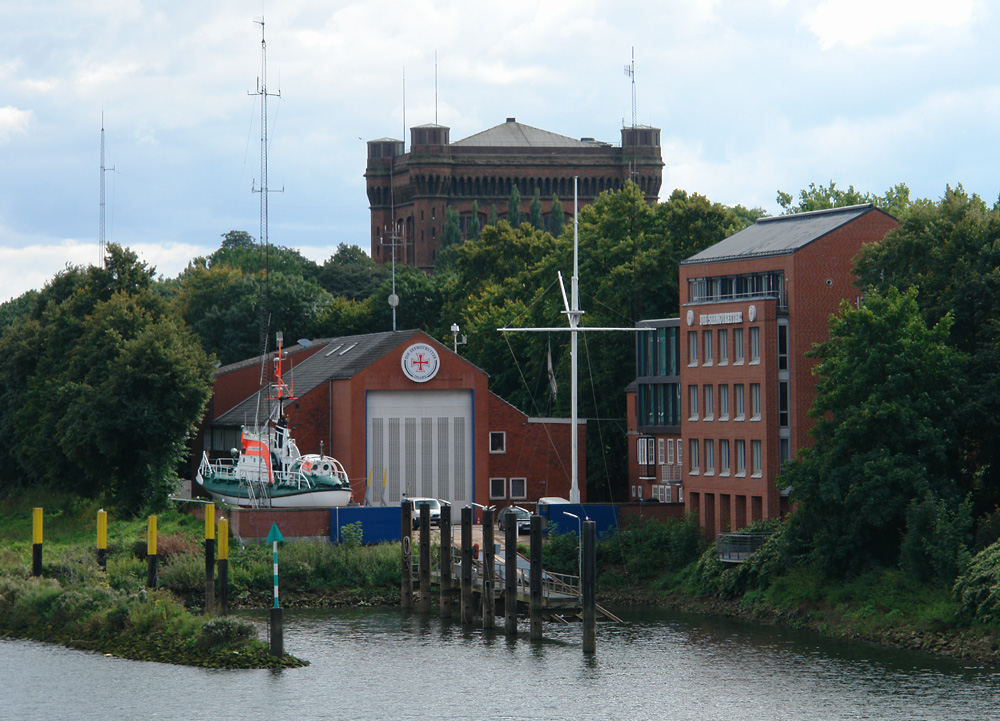
Marine Rescue Coordination Centre Bremen at the Weser

The Maritime Rescue Coordination Centre Bremen (MRCC, German: Seenotleitstelle Bremen) is responsible for coordinating air-sea rescue for the German sea-area of North Sea and Baltic Sea. It covers a shoreline of 3,660 kilometres (2,270 mi) length, and is owned and operated by German Maritime Search and Rescue Service at their headquarters in the Hanseatic city of Bremen. The MRCC works with the Central Command for Maritime Emergencies (CCME) in Cuxhaven.

== Description ==
The centre receives emergency calls and coordinates search and rescue (SAR) activities in its area of responsibility. It also leads and coordinates about 60 German SAR-boats, run by the search and rescue service.

Maritime Rescue Coordination Centre Bremen runs Bremen Rescue Radio (call sign: "Bremen Rescue"), which listens on VHF channels 16 and 70 (Digital Selective Calling or DSC) and on shortwave channel 2187.5 kHz (DSC).

After the omission of the regular coastal radio stations it was necessary within the framework of the Global Maritime Distress and Safety System to have a station for the German sea areas A1 and A2. The Danish Lyngby Radio covers sea area A2 by medium frequencies, while Bremen Rescue Radio covers sea area A1 for the North Sea and the Baltic Sea, operating at VHF with a network of repeaters along the coastline. The official handover of coastal radio service took place on 12 January 1999.
