= MSC Flaminia =

German container ship

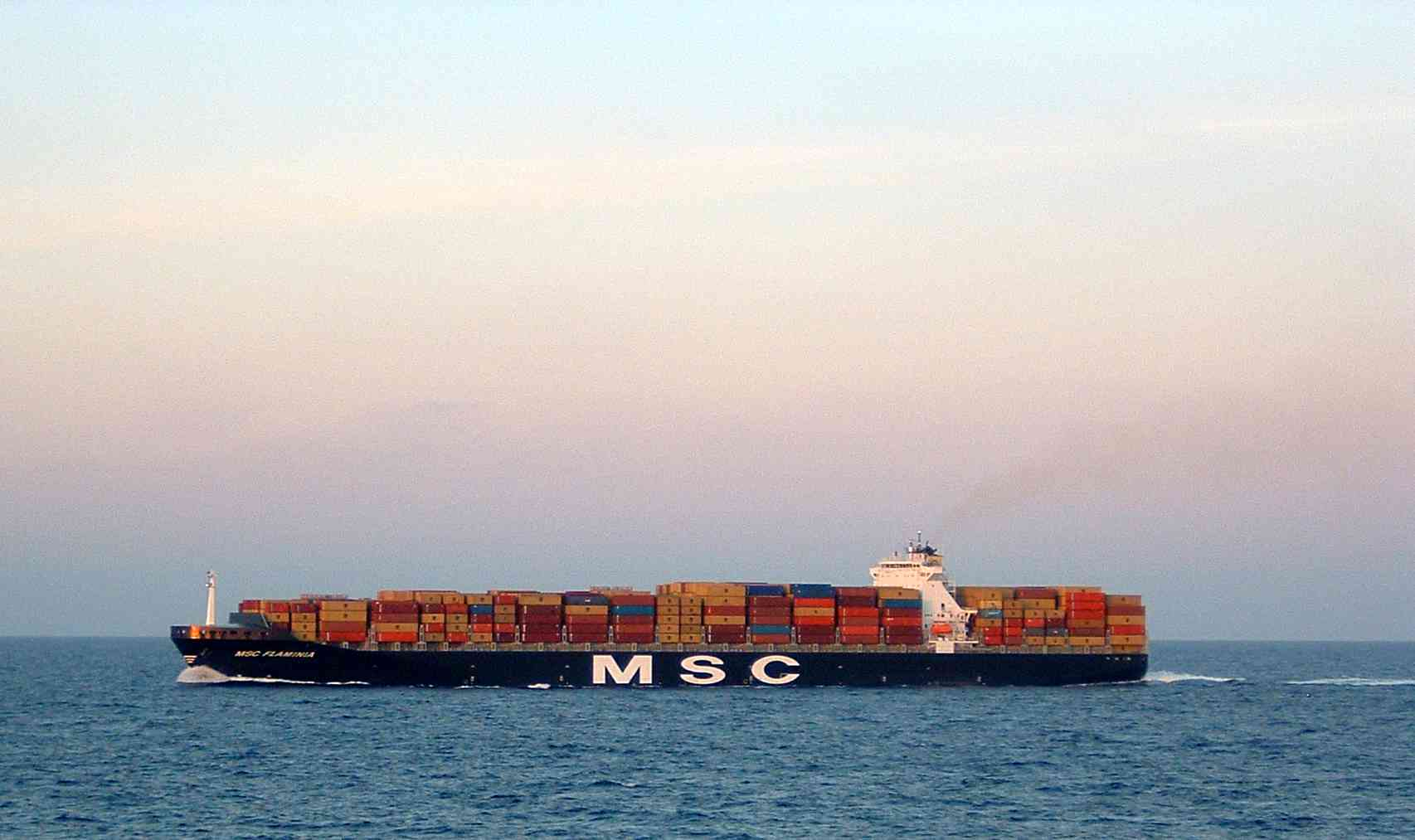

History
- Name: MSC Flaminia
- Owner: Conti Reederei
- Operator: NSB Niederelbe
- Port of registry: Hamburg, Germany
- Builder: Daewoo Shipbuilding & Marine Engineering
- Yard number: 4073
- Laid down: 5 March 2001
- Launched: 26 May 2001
- Sponsored by: Flaminia Manghina
- Completed: 20 August 2001
- In service: 2001–2012; 2014–
- Identification: Call sign: DHZR; IMO number: 9225615; MMSI number: 211378120
- Status: In service
- Notes: current ship name: CMA CGM San Francisco

General characteristics
- Type: Container ship
- Tonnage: 75,590 GT; 42,233 NT; 85,823 DWT
- Length: 299.99 m (984 ft 3 in)
- Beam: 40 m (131 ft 3 in)
- Draft: 14.5 m (47 ft 7 in)
- Depth: 24.2 m (79 ft 5 in)
- Installed power: Hyundai-MAN B&W 10K98 MC-C (57,100 kW)
- Propulsion: Single shaft, fixed-pitch propeller; Bow thruster (1,500 kW)
- Speed: 25 knots (46 km/h; 29 mph)
- Capacity: 6,750 TEU
- Crew: 23

MSC Flaminia is a German container ship which caught fire on 14 July 2012, claiming three lives (only two of which could be recovered) and forcing the crew to abandon ship in the middle of the Atlantic Ocean. After the fire had been brought under control, the stricken container ship was towed to Europe and arrived at Wilhelmshaven, Germany, on 9 September 2012. In March 2013, she departed Wilhelmshaven for Mangalia, Romania for repairs which were finished in July 2014. The ship is currently sailing under the name CMA CGM San Francisco.

== Description ==
MSC Flaminia is a post-Panamax container ship with a capacity of 6,750 TEUs and deadweight tonnage of 85,823 tons. She is nearly 300 metres (984 ft 3 in) long and 40 metres (131 ft 3 in) wide, and fully laden draws 14.5 metres (47 ft 7 in) of water. Like most large container ships, MSC Flaminia is powered by a single low-speed two-stroke crosshead diesel engine coupled to a fixed-pitch propeller. Her main engine, a 10-cylinder Hyundai-MAN B&W 10K98 MC-C, is rated at 57,100 kW (76,600 hp) and is capable of propelling the ship at 25 knots (46 km/h; 29 mph). She also has a 1,500 kW bow thruster for manoeuvering at ports. Power for onboard consumers and reefer containers is generated by four Wärtsilä 6R32LND auxiliary generators.

== History ==
MSC Flaminia was built in 2001 by South Korean shipbuilder Daewoo Shipbuilding & Marine Engineering, commonly abbreviated as DSME. Laid down on 5 March 2001 and launched on 26 May, she was completed and entered service on 20 August 2001 with Hamburg, Germany, as her port of registry. The ship, owned by Conti Reederei and managed by NSB Niederelbe, has been chartered to Mediterranean Shipping Company (MSC) for 16 years.

=== 2012 fire ===
On 14 July 2012, a fire in hold 4 caused an explosion aboard MSC Flaminia while the ship was underway from Charleston, South Carolina US to Antwerp, Belgium, forcing the crew to abandon the ship some 1,000 nautical miles (1,900 km; 1,200 mi) from nearest land in the middle of the Atlantic Ocean. Her Majesty's Coastguard received a distress signal at 10:07 (UTC (GMT)) and broadcast an alert to all vessels in the area. DS Crown, a German-owned, Bahamas-flagged oil tanker en route from Halifax, Nova Scotia, Canada to Falmouth, Cornwall, United Kingdom, was the first to arrive at the scene and rescue 22 crew members and two passengers from a lifeboat and a liferaft. One crewman remains missing and is presumed dead. The ship's first officer died on DS Crown shortly after being taken aboard from burns he had sustained while fighting the fire. On 8 October, another seriously injured crew member of MSC Flaminia died in a specialist hospital for burn wounds in Portugal. A number of containers were also lost overboard.

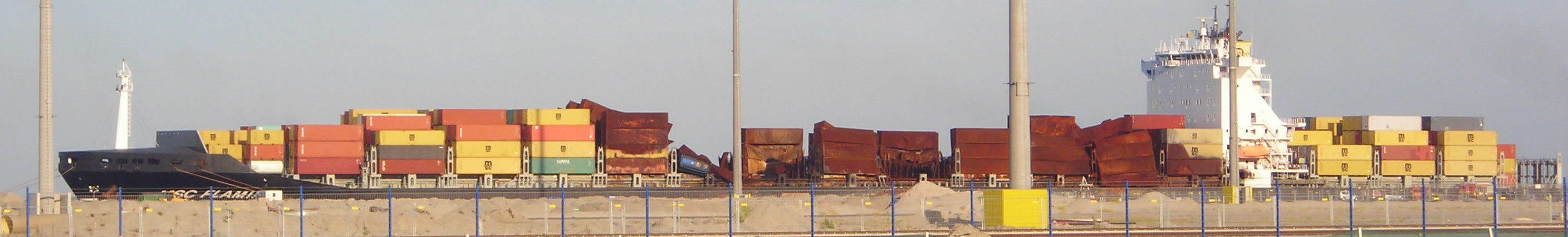
The damaged MSC Flaminia at JadeWeserPort in Wilhelmshaven, Germany.

After the crew and passengers had abandoned the ship, MSC Flaminia was left drifting in mid-Atlantic. Dutch salvage company Smit International signed a salvage contract for the stricken vessel, but the extent of the fire was not known until the first salvage tug, Fairmount Expedition, arrived at the scene on 17 July. According to the first reports, the fire was still burning in holds 4, 5 and 6, and the ship had developed a list of about 8.5 degrees as a result of the firefighting operations, but the engine room, superstructure and aftship were not seriously damaged. A second explosion occurred on the ship on 18 July, but the salvage efforts soon continued. The ship's own firefighting system was also started and the salvage personnel attempted to find the missing crewman. On 20 July, Fairmount Expedition began to tow MSC Flaminia towards Europe while Anglian Sovereign, another salvage tug with specialized firefighting equipment, continued to cool down the fire. On 24 July, it was announced that the fire on board MSC Flaminia was under control and an aerial high definition video, recorded by a helicopter on 26 July, showed the damage to the ship and its containers. By 29 July, the ship had arrived within 100 nautical miles (190 km; 120 mi) of the British coast. However, the deteriorating weather prevented the salvage crew from entering the ship, then listing at 10 degrees, on 31 July and she was moved away from the coast. Although the fires had been put out in holds 4, 5 and 6, temperatures in hold 7 were still rising. On 13 August, the salvage efforts restarted but, as no European country had given the ship a permission to enter its coastal waters, MSC Flaminia remained at her waiting position approximately 240 nautical miles (440 km; 280 mi) offshore. In addition to extinguishing individual containers, the salvage crew had pumped water from the cargo holds to stabilize the vessel, reducing the list to around 2.5 degrees.

On 20 August 2012, five weeks after the crew abandoned the vessel, MSC Flaminia was given permission to enter German waters. After the ship had been towed to a sheltered anchorage off Land's End, a team of experts entered the vessel and identified the possible hazards on board. After the ship had been deemed safe, she was allowed to pass through the English Channel and proceed to Heligoland and later to JadeWeserPort in Wilhelmshaven, Germany, where she arrived on 9 September 2012.

The fire aboard the MSC Flaminia was due to the auto-polymerization and ignition of the chemical DVB80 (Divinylbenzene 80%), which is used in making plastic resins. The chemical was stored incorrectly while on shore, and loaded incorrectly on the vessel for the transatlantic crossing. The chemical was incorrectly loaded because the container was labelled as a marine toxin rather than an explosive hazard. Marine toxins are stored in the cargo hold to reduce the risk of spills in the ocean. Explosive hazards are stored on deck to reduce risk of structure damage due to explosions.

In 2018, the United States District Court for the Southern District of New York found MSC was not liable for the loss. MSC was found to be following industry practices given the information they possessed on the cargo. The court said that two parties bear the responsibility for the incident, those being Deltech, and Stolt Tank Containers B.V. The New York court found Deltech 55% strictly liable and Stolt Tank Containers 45% strictly liable for the fire and explosion. The vessel owner Conti and its operator NSB were also cleared from responsibility for losses as the vessel was in sound condition when provided and the crew was properly trained.

The fire onboard MSC Flaminia has again raised concerns about misdeclared cargo. Containers containing explosive or flammable materials are normally carried on the decks for safety, but if the cargo manifest is incorrect or falsified, they might be stowed inside the cargo holds where they create a potential hazard. The shipping company has confirmed that, according to the cargo manifest, the ship was not carrying calcium hypochlorite, a chemical compound responsible for several container ship fires in the 1990s, in any of the 2,876 containers on board the ship. Furthermore, the reluctance of any country to give permission for the ship to enter its coastal areas raised concerns about the vessel sinking or being intentionally scuttled in deep water. A similar situation resulted in a major oil spill in 2002 when the oil tanker Prestige broke in two and sank after French, Portuguese and Spanish governments refused to allow the ship to dock in their ports.

In March 2013, MSC Flaminia departed Wilhelmshave for Mangalia, Romania, where she underwent extensive repairs. The repairs concluded with sea trials in July 2014.

== See also ==
- Hyundai Fortune, a 5,551 TEU container ship that was seriously damaged in a similar fire in 2006.
