= MV Pallas =

Wrecked cargo ship

Coordinates: 54°32′30″N 8°17′12″E

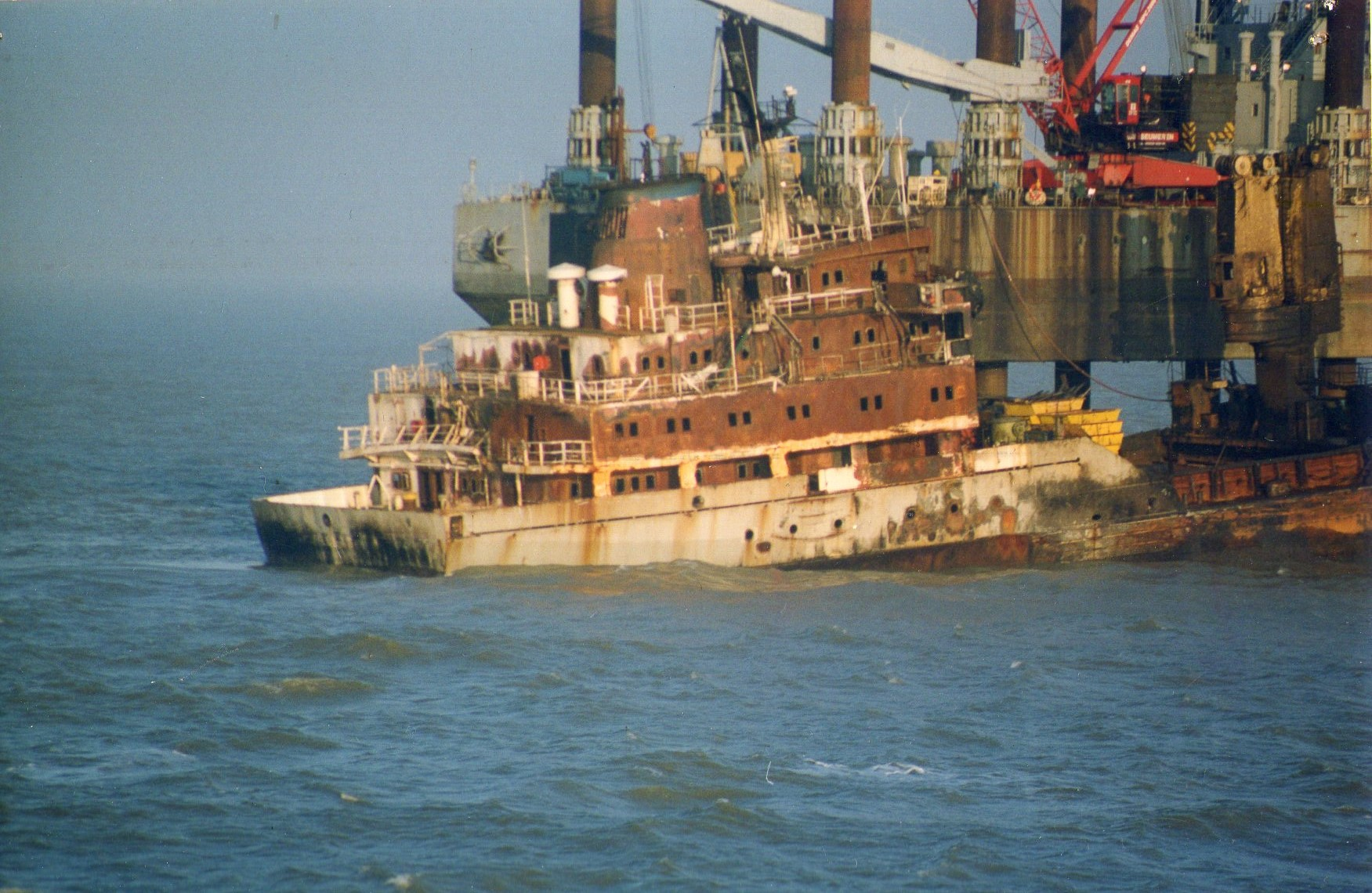
Wreck of the Pallas in 1999

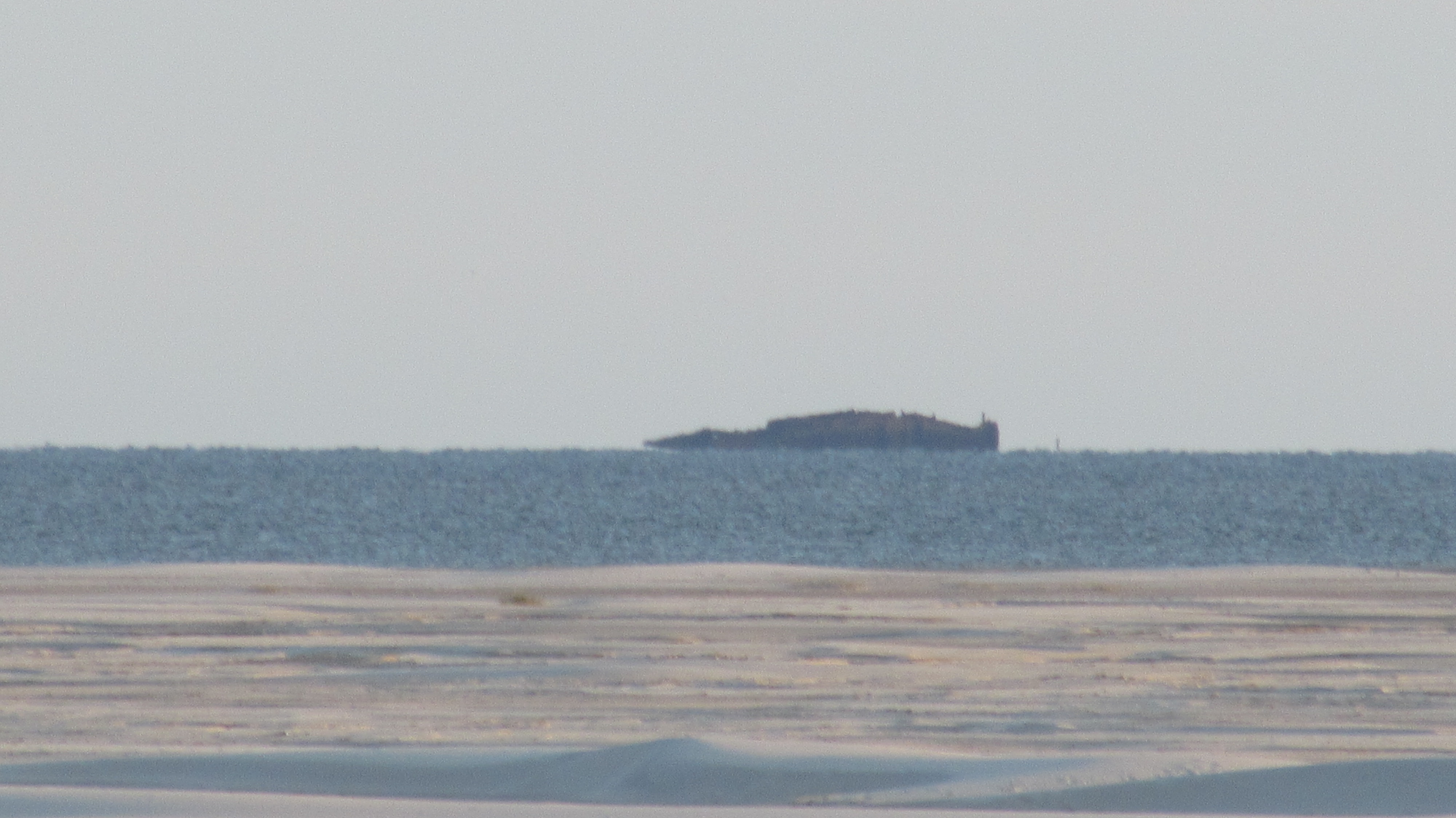
Wreck of the Pallas off Amrum as seen in 2015

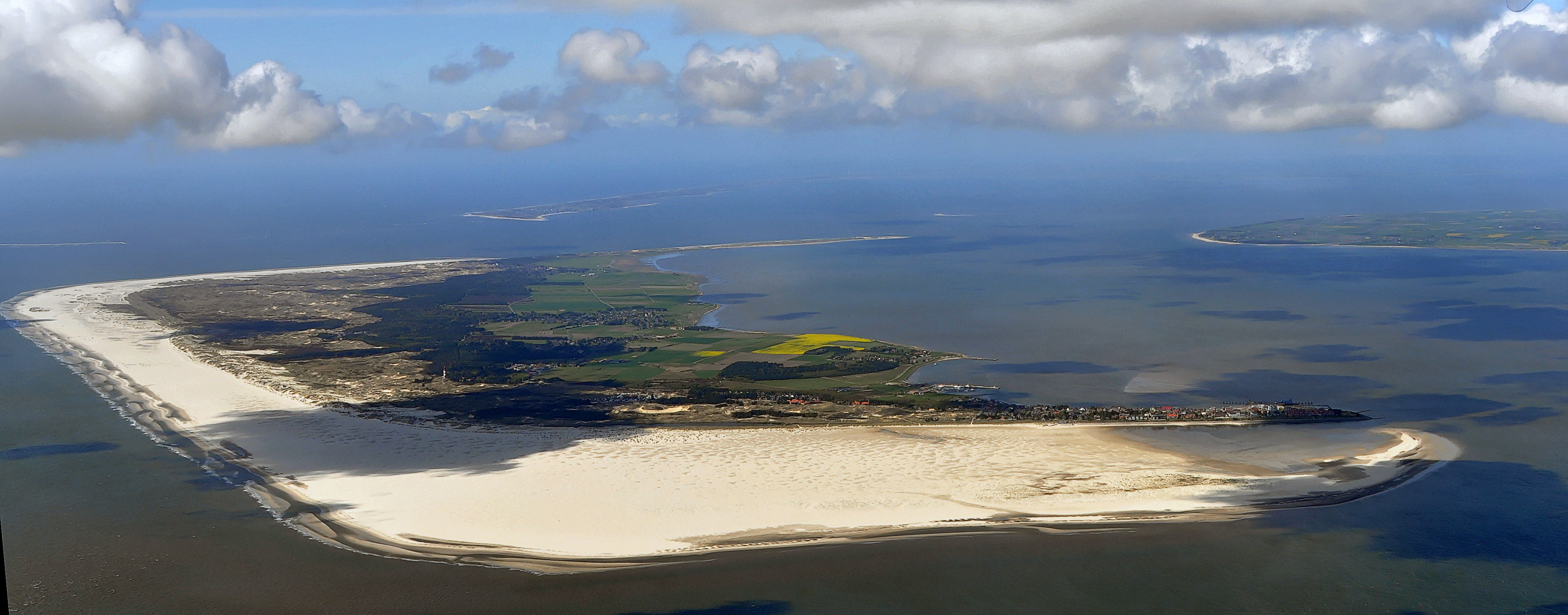
The accident affected the entire Wadden Sea, especially around the island of Amrum

M/V Pallas, callsign C6LO9, IMO number 7039206, was a 147-metre (482 ft) cargo ship built in 1971. On 25 October 1998, her cargo of lumber caught fire while traveling the North Sea off the west coast of Jutland. The ship ran aground on 29 October off the German island of Amrum, in the Schleswig-Holstein Wadden Sea National Park. Around 200–300 tons of fuel oil was lost overboard and caused Germany's most notable maritime environmental disaster.

Parts of the wreck still lie off the island of Amrum and are visible at low tide.

== Fire and sinking ==
At the time of the sinking, the ship was owned by the Italian company Bogazzi Servizi Naval and running under the flag of Bahamas.

On 20 October 1998, the Pallas started in the Swedish port of Hudiksvall north of Stockholm. She was to bring 2,500 tons of sawn timber from Sweden to Morocco. The captain first tried unsuccessfully to smother the fire. At 11:54 p.m., the ship broadcast a "Mayday". A Danish and a German rescue helicopter subsequently made their way to the blazing freighter.

The fire could not be contained and the crew was evacuated; one crew member died in the process.

Several attempts to get the ship under tow were unsuccessful, and it ran aground on 29 October off the German island of Amrum, in the Schleswig-Holstein Wadden Sea National Park.

The smoldering fire in the cargo could only be fully extinguished a month after it broke out. Parts of the wreck of the Pallas still lie off Amrum and are visible at low tide.

== Environmental disaster ==
Around 200–300 tons of fuel oil were lost overboard, killing approximately 16,000 sea birds, predominantly common eiders. Only parts of the wreck could be salvaged to date, and the hull is still visible off Amrum.

== Political consequences ==
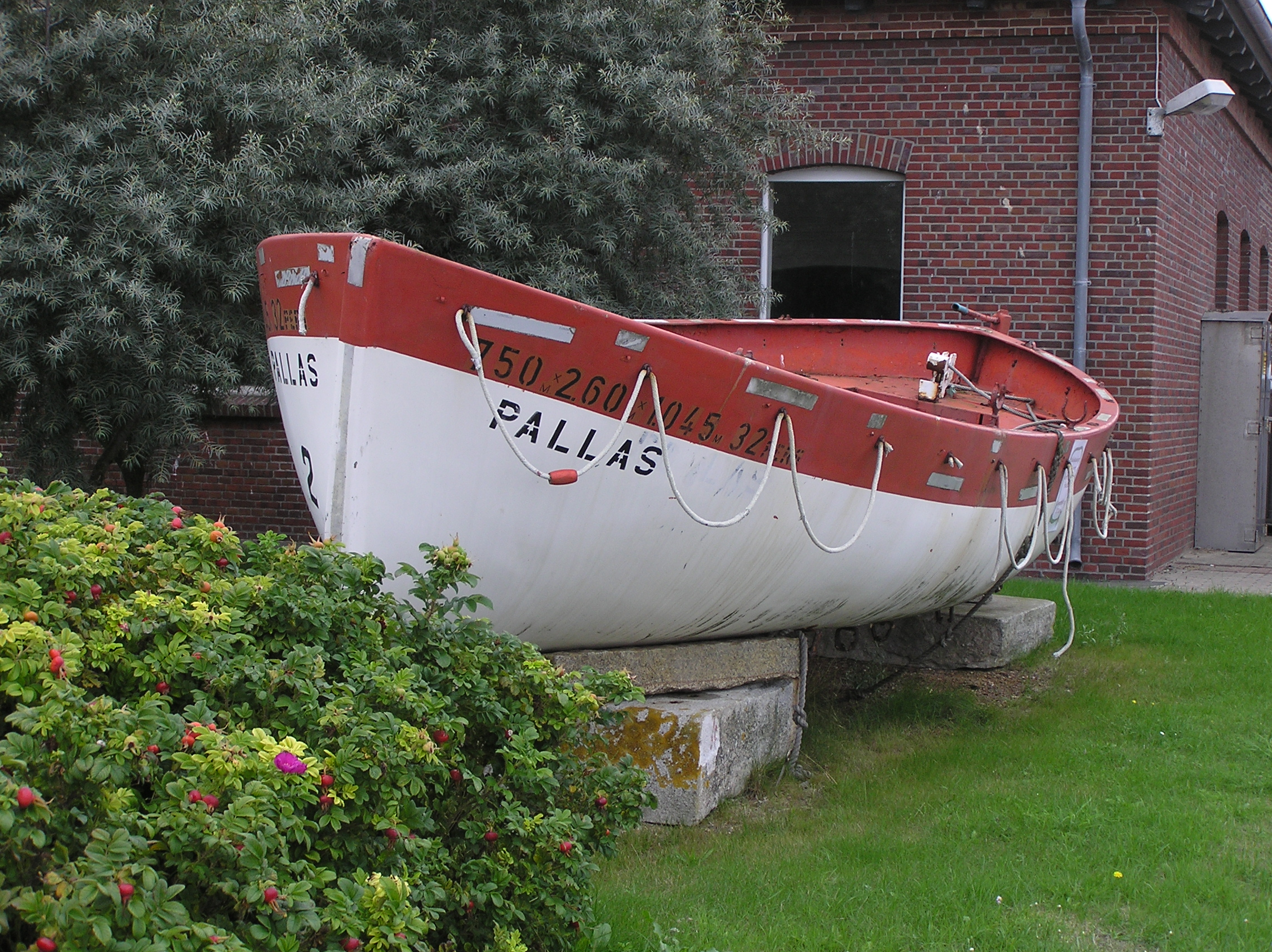
Rescue boat of Pallas at WSA-station on Amrum

The case led to political discontent over a lack of coordinated emergency tow capabilities on the German coast, and contributed to the establishment of the Central Command for Maritime Emergencies (German: Havariekommando).

The Minister for Environment of Schleswig-Holstein Rainder Steenblock (Alliance 90/The Greens) was criticized many times for his refusal to take responsibility. Steenblock only traveled to the disaster site under pressure from Prime Minister Heide Simonis (SPD). Not only the Greens-friendly environmental protection associations NABU and BUND suggested that he resign in the month after the incident, also the MP Adelheid Winking-Nikolay from his own parliamentary group, Der Spiegel wrote in 1999.

== Links ==
- Lars Clausen: Schwachstellenanalyse aus Anlass der Havarie der PALLAS. Bundesverwaltungsamt – Zentralstelle für Zivilschutz, Bonn 2003, ISSN 0343-5164
- Abschlussbericht des Untersuchungsausschusses Pallas des Landtags Schleswig-Holstein auf Landtags-Drucksache 14/2650 vom 18. Januar 2000 (pdf; 28,8 MB)
