= Baltic (tug) =

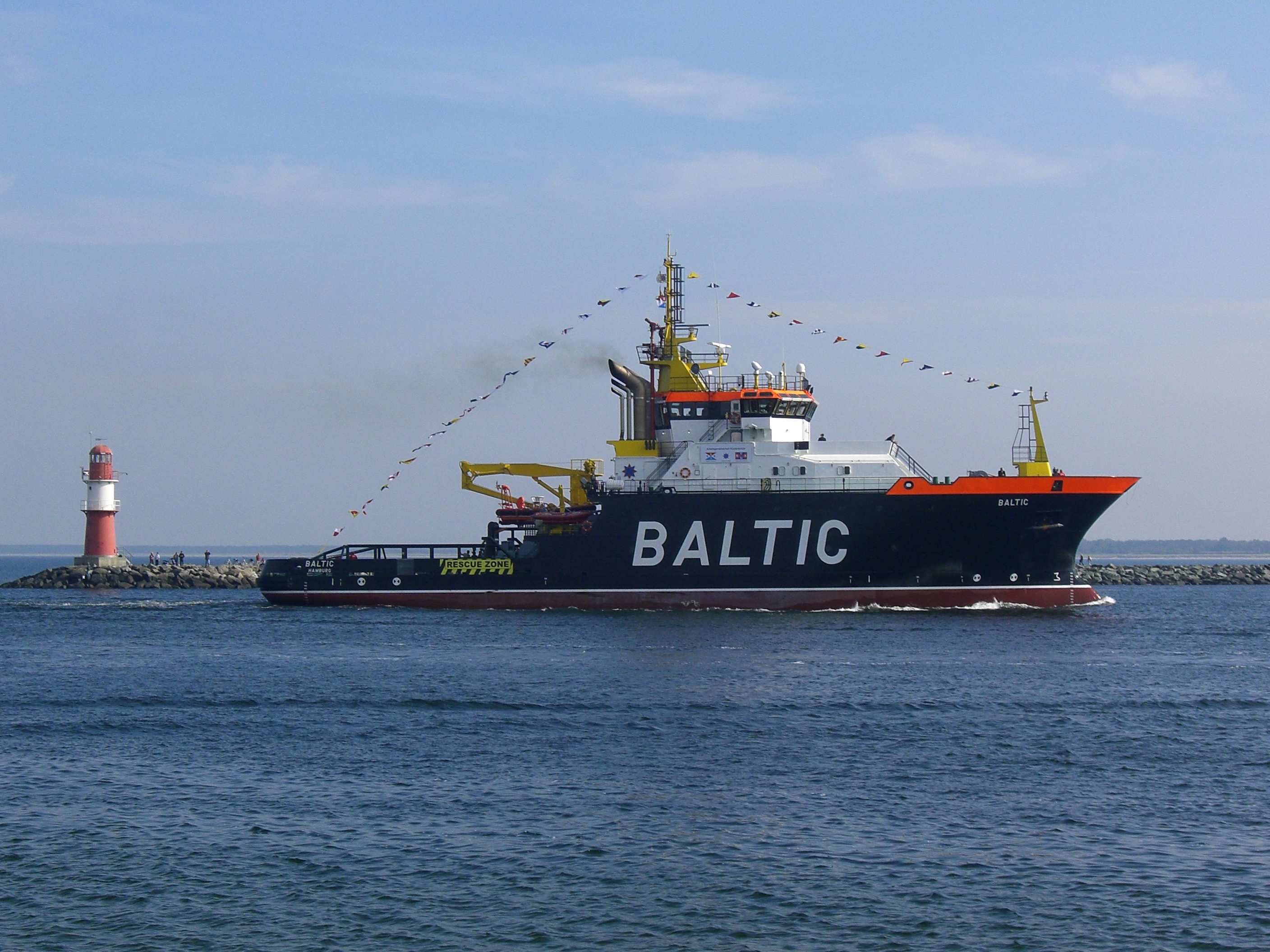
- Baltic sailing into the port of Warnemünde

History

Germany
- Name: Baltic
- Owner: ARGE Küstenschutz
- Builder: Astilleros Armon, Vigo, Spain
- Commissioned: 24 September 2010
- Homeport: Hamburg
- Identification: IMO number: 9556026; MMSI number: 218413000; Call sign: DGWJ2
- Status: Active

General characteristics
- Class & type: Luz de Mar salvage tug
- Tonnage: 2,068 GT
- Length: 61.36 m (201 ft 4 in) (overall)
- Beam: 15 m (49 ft 3 in)
- Draught: max. 6 m (19 ft 8 in)
- Installed power: 2 × GE 16V 250MDB4, 8,479 kW (11,371 hp)
- Propulsion: 2 × Schottel SCP 100/4XG
- Speed: 17 knots (31 km/h; 20 mph)
- Complement: 8
- Sensors & processing systems: Radar

Baltic is a German emergency tow vessel (ETV) commissioned in 2010.

The vessel which was built in Spain by Astilleros Armon is owned by Arbeitsgemeinschaft Küstenschutz of Germany, a consortium of tugboat companies. The Federal Ministry of Transport, Building and Urban Development of Germany has chartered the vessel to protect the German coastline. The Baltic replaced the tugboat Fairplay 26 as an ETV and operates from Warnemünde in the western Baltic Sea. She was commissioned on 24 September 2010.

The Baltic features a bollard pull of 127 tons and a maximum speed of 17 knots (31 km/h; 20 mph).

In October 2010, only a few days after commissioning, Baltic was deployed to assist during the fire on the ferry Lisco Gloria off the island of Fehmarn.

== Technical dates ==
=== Engine ===
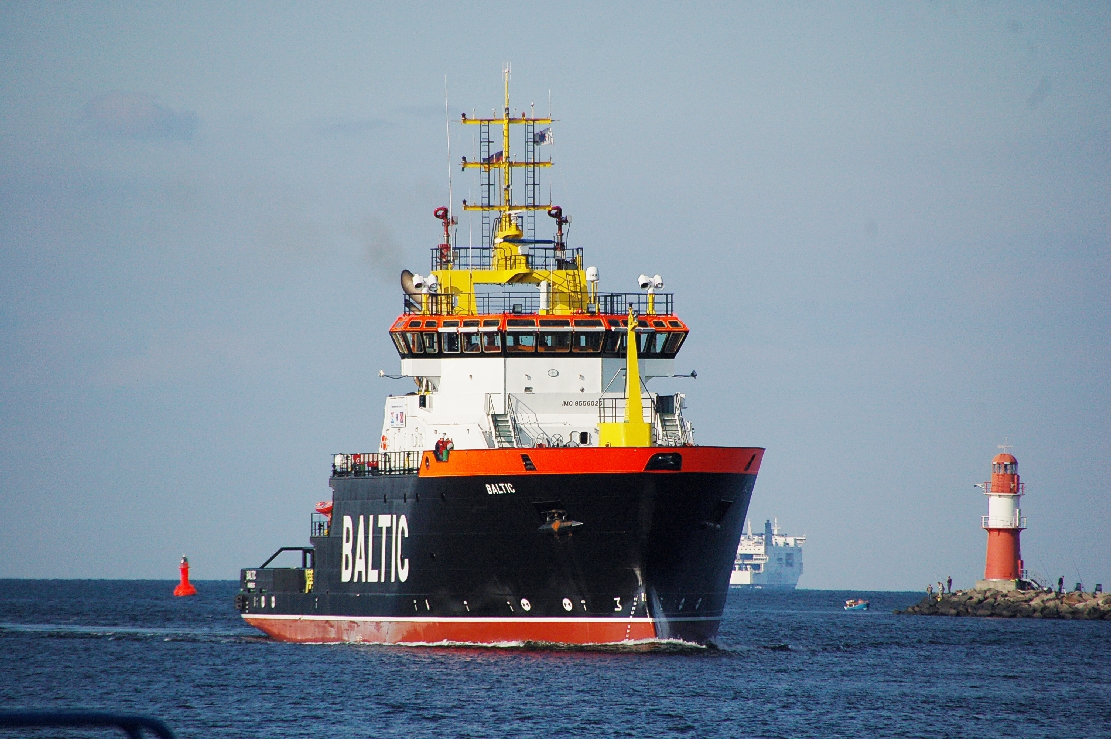
Front view

The Baltic is driven by two main engines of the General Electric 16V250MDB3 type which are connected to two Schottel controllable pitch propellers via transmissions and drive shafts. The engines are 16-cylinder Diesel units which can provide 4,239 kilowatts (5,685 hp) each at a nominal 1,050 revolutions per minute. The propellers are encased in Kort nozzles and have a maximum revolution speed of 170 rpm. Two thrusters are installed in the bow and the stern section respectively to improve the ship's manoeuvrability.

To provide electrical power, two generators with a power of 1,500 kVA each are coupled to the drive shafts. Additionally two main generators of 500 kVA and an emergency power unit (150 kVA) are installed on board.

=== Equipment ===
When commissioned, the Baltic was the most powerful tugboat along the German Baltic Sea coast. For towing tasks, the ship is equipped with two hydraulic winches. The towline has a diameter of 62 mm and a length of 500 m. Two fire monitors are installed on board.

== See also ==
- Nordic, the Baltic's equivalent in the North Sea
