= Albrecht Theodor Middeldorpf =

German surgeon (1824–1868)

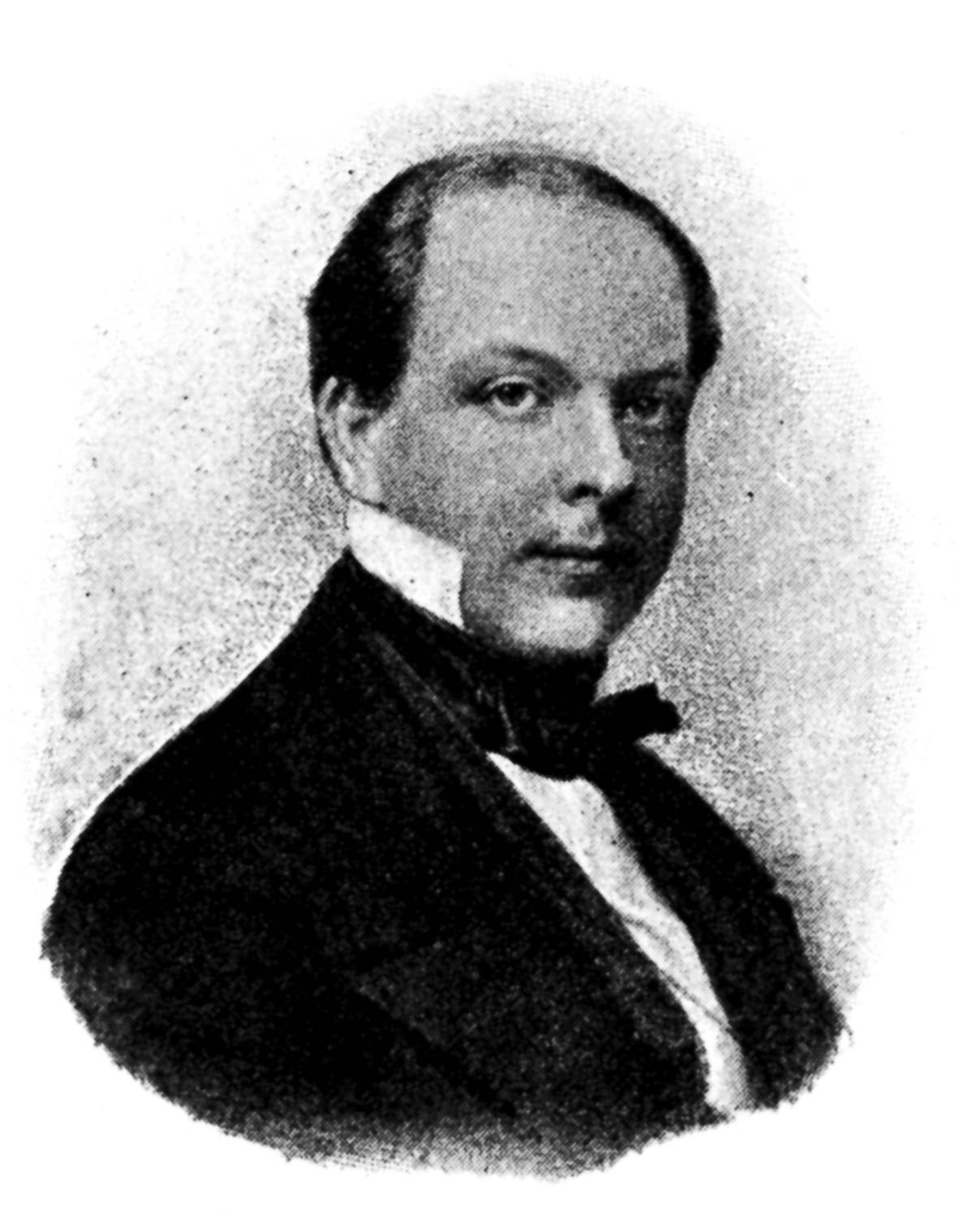
Albrecht Theodor Middeldorpf

Albrecht Theodor Middeldorpf (3 July 1824, Breslau – 29 July 1868, Breslau) was a German surgeon.

He studied medicine at the universities of Breslau and Berlin, receiving his medical doctorate in 1846. As a student, his instructors included Jan Evangelista Purkyně, Johannes Peter Müller and Johann Friedrich Dieffenbach. Following graduation, he worked as assistant under Purkyně at Breslau for a year, then embarked on a study trip to Vienna and Paris. In 1853 he became an associate professor of surgery and ophthalmology at Breslau, and soon afterwards, was named head surgeon of the Allerheiligen-Hospital. In 1856 he became a full professor and director of the surgical-ophthalmologic clinic. During the Second Schleswig War (1864) and Austro-Prussian War (1864), he distinguished himself in the treatment of battle-related injuries.

He is best remembered for his pioneer work in galvanocautery, being credited with the standardization of its surgical techniques. In 1854 he published the first monograph in regards to the application of electrical current in surgery. In September 1856 he demonstrated his galvano-surgical methods in Paris, of which, he was awarded the Montyon Prize by the Paris Academy of Sciences.

== Selected works ==
- Beiträge zur Lehre von den Knochenbrüchen, 1853 – Contributions to the education of fractures.
- Die Galvanokaustik, ein Beitrag zur operativen Medizin, 1854 – Galvanocautery, a contribution to operational medicine.
- Überblick über die Akidopeirastik, eine neue Untersuchungsmethode mit Hülfe spitziger Werkzeuge, 1856 – Survey of acupuncture: a new examination method using pointed tools.
- Abrégé de la galvanocaustie (in French), 1864 – Summary of galvanocautery.
