= Anglian Sovereign =

Belgian tugboat

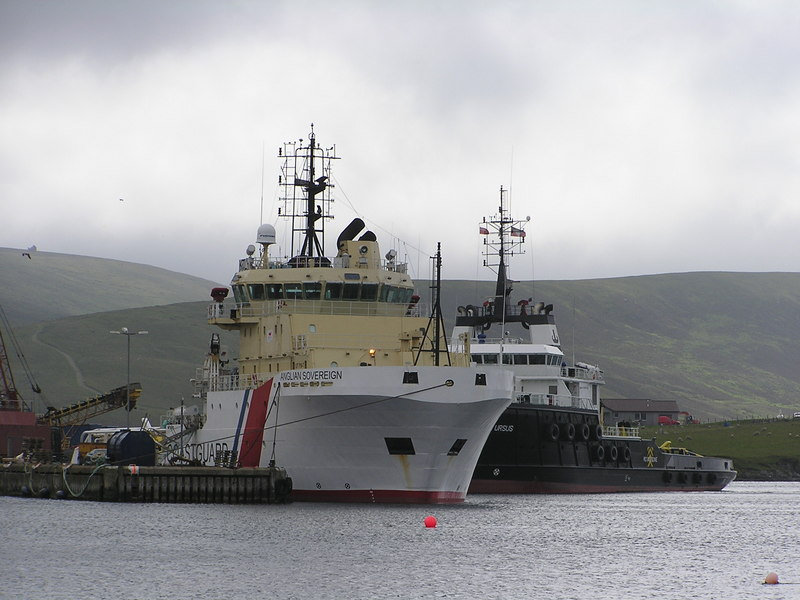
- Union Sovereign at Scalloway in 2008

History

Belgium
- Name: Union Sovereign
- Owner: Royal Boskalis Westminster N.V
- Operator: Royal Boskalis Westminster N.V
- Port of registry: Antwerp
- Yard number: wa
- Christened: 27 August 2003
- Homeport: Antwerp
- Identification: IMO number: 9262742; MMSI number: 205644000; Call sign: ORQW
- Status: Active

General characteristics
- Tonnage: 2,258 GT
- Length: 67.4 metres (221 ft)
- Beam: 15.5 metres (51 ft)
- Draught: 6.2 metres (20 ft)
- Installed power: 2 × Wärtsilä 16V32LND, 16,400 horsepower (12,200 kW) total
- Speed: 17 knots (31 km/h; 20 mph)
- Notes: Bollard pull 180 tonnes

The Sovereign is a large sea-going tugboat owned and operated by Royal Boskalis Westminster N.V.

The vessel is powered by conventional propulsion and was built as a multi-purpose anchor handling tug supply vessel. It was christened on 27 August 2003 as Anglian Sovereign. The vessel was part of the fleet of Emergency Towing Vessels that operated on behalf of the UK's Maritime and Coastguard Agency.

On 3 September 2005, Union Sovereign ran aground off Oxna island in the Scalloway Islands while conducting hydrographic surveys. No injuries occurred but the vessel lost approximately 84 tonnes of gas oil and was severely damaged. A 2006 official report found that the shipmaster's consumption of alcohol and several other negligences on board had been the cause of the incident.

In 2007, ownership transferred to JP Knight, which purchased the initial owner, Klyne Tugs of Lowestoft.

== Notable operations ==
- Towing MSC Flaminia in July 2012
