= Emergency tow vessel =

Type of ship used for towing disabled vessels across high seas to safe waters

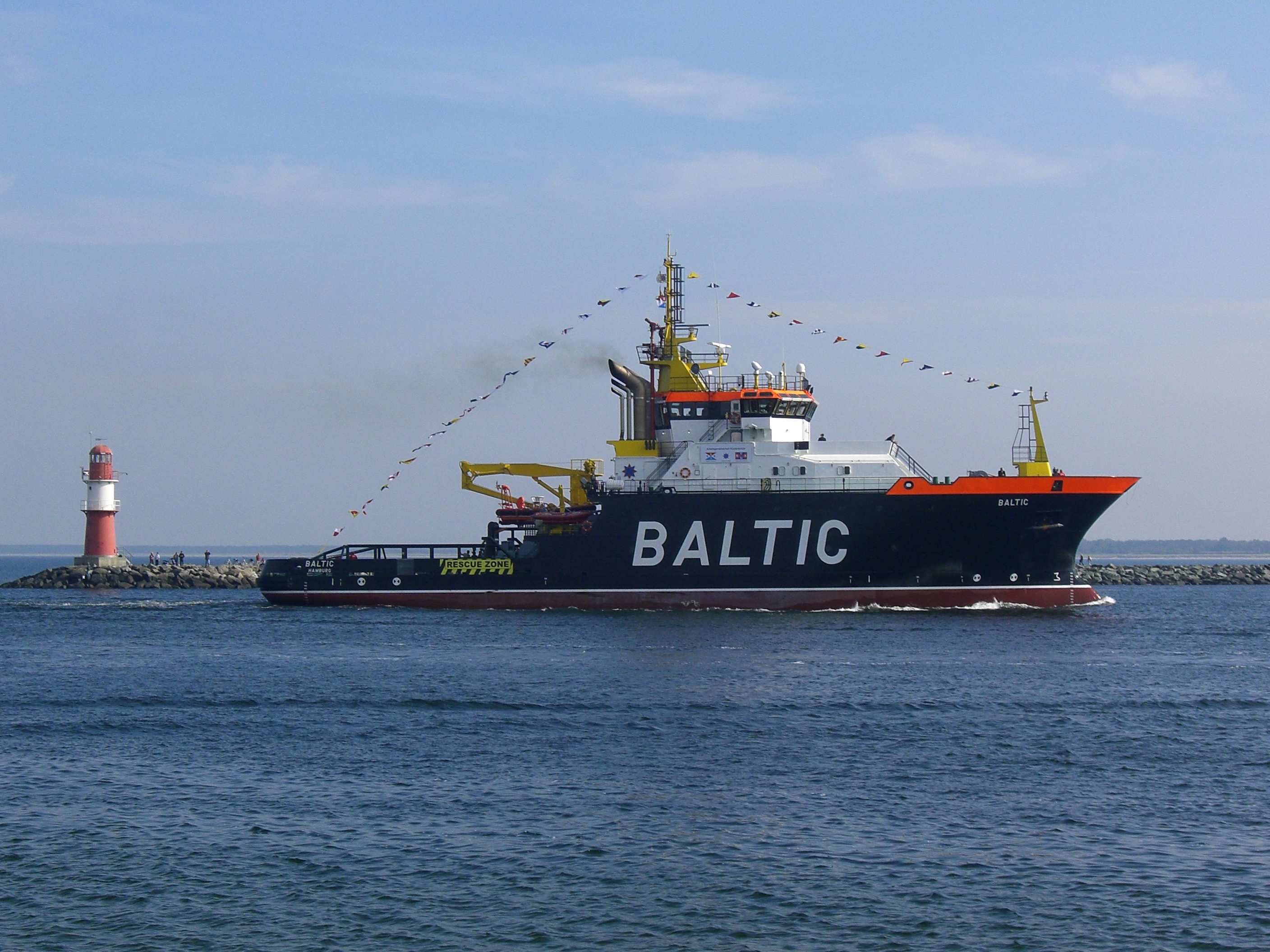
German ETV Baltic

An emergency tow vessel, also called emergency towing vessel, (ETV) is a multi purpose boat used by state authorities to tow disabled vessels on high seas in order to prevent dangers to man and environment. The disabled vessel is either towed to a safe haven or kept in place against wind and current until commercial assistance by tug boats has arrived on site or until it has been repaired to the extent of being able to manoeuvre on its own. The need for ETVs as a preventive measure has arisen since the number of available commercial salvage tugs was reduced while potential dangers from individual vessels have increased. E.g. Spain has fourteen, Turkey has eleven, Germany operates eight, Norway has seven, France has five, Sweden three and the Netherlands, Poland, South Africa, Iceland and Finland each have one official emergency tug boat. Australia also operates emergency response vessels. The United Kingdom's four strong ETV fleet was to be disbanded in September 2011 due to budget cuts but the two vessels operating in Scottish waters received an extension of contract until the end of 2011.

== External requirements ==
Distressed vessels that request the service of towing vessels have means to make towing as safe as possible. Oil tankers have emergency towing equipment fixed at the forward and aft part of the vessel that will allow to connect the towing line. The connection of these apparatuses to the vessel's hull is reinforced according with class requirements. Bulk carriers and general cargo vessels are not required to have a specialized emergency towing arrangement. Depending on the vessel's type and keel laid date, in accordance with the MSC256(84) standard they must have on board an emergency towing procedure manual. This ship-specific manual describes procedures that will allow the vessel to be towed using its own equipment. The procedure should make use of the standard mooring equipment like mooring ropes, bits, rollers and Panama chock.

== National ETV fleets ==
=== Algeria ===
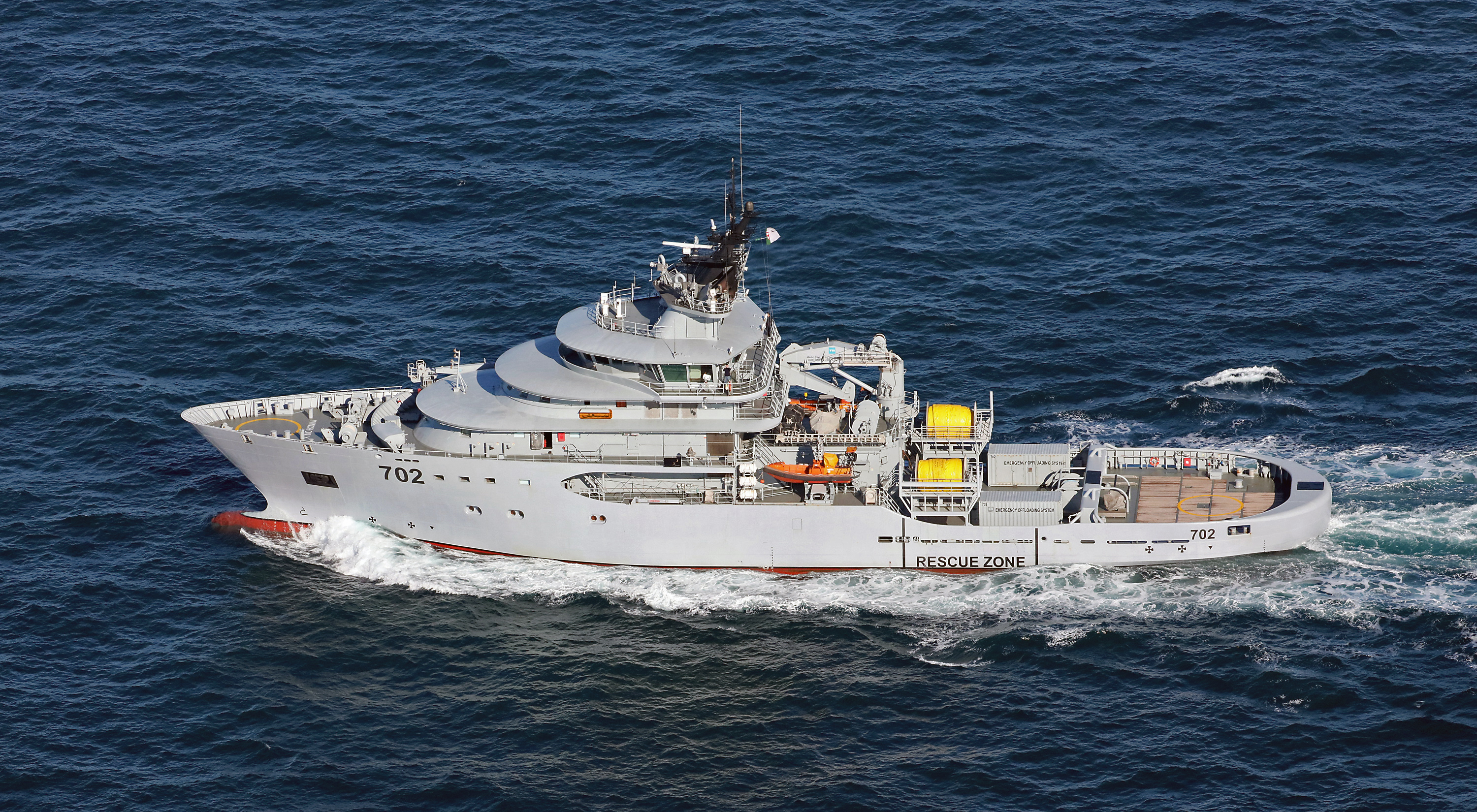
Algerian ETV El Mousif in the English Channel

In 2010 Algeria ordered three tug boats of the Bourbon class which was already in use in the French harbours of Brest and Cherbourg. The ships were built by STX OSV in Norway and STX Tulcea in Romania. A first vessel El Moundjid was ready for delivery in December 2011, the two others were scheduled for delivery in June and September 2012.

With a bollard pull of 200 tons and a speed of 20 knots (37 km/h; 23 mph), the Algerian ETVs are an improved version of the French Bourbon class. They are based in Oran and Skikda. By acquiring these three ships, Algeria became the leading Mediterranean nation in terms of marine salvage as of 2012.

=== Finland ===
The Ministry of the Environment operates the Louhi. The ship is listed as a multi-purpose oil recovery vessel and can be used for emergency towing, fire-fighting, icebreaking, mine-laying, to combat oil/chemical spills, as well as other rescue operations. The vessel has a bollard pull of 60 t. YAG Louhi is based at the Port of Upinniemi approximately 40 km west of Helsinki in the Archipelago Sea.

=== France ===
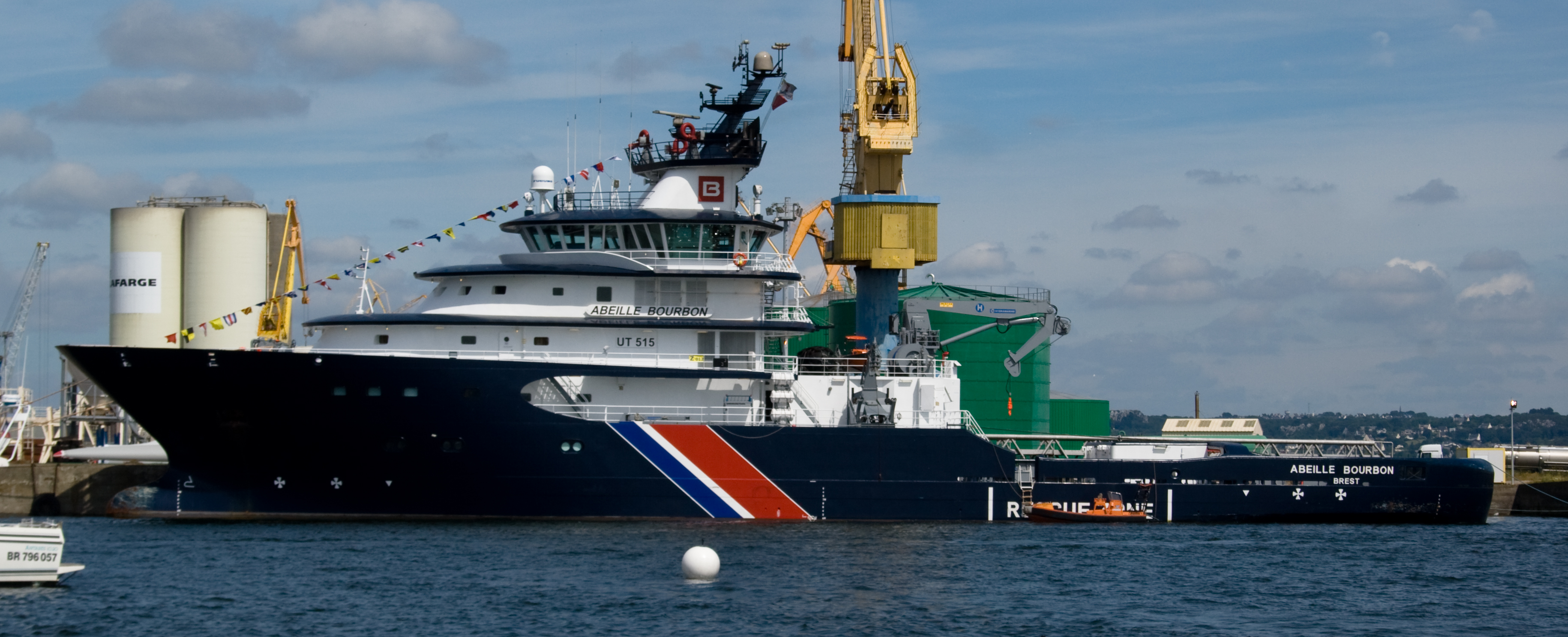
French ETV Abeille Bourbon in Brest

For assistance and salvage, 5 ocean-going tugs and their crews are ready to respond around-the-clock

- Abeille Bourbon: based in Brest, bollard pull of 200 tons.
- Abeille Liberté: based in Cherbourg, bollard pull of 200 tons.
- Abeille Normandie: based in Boulogne sur Mer, bollard pull of 280 tons.
- Abeille Méditerranée: based in Toulon, bollard pull of 280 tons.
- Jason: based in Toulon, bollard pull of 124.2 tons.

The tugs are chartered by the French government and crewed by merchant marine sailors. France also shares funding of the Dover based British ETV.

=== Germany ===
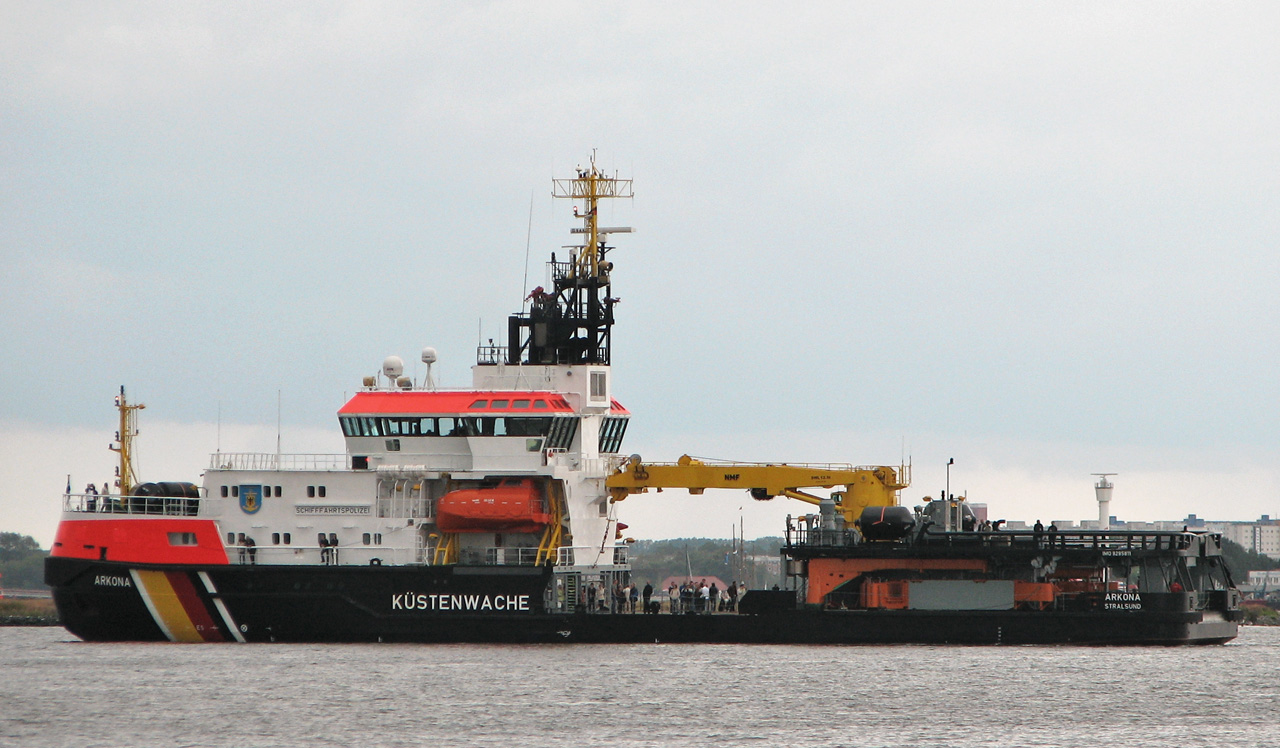
German multi-purpose vessel Arkona

Responsible for the German ETV flotilla is the Central Command for Maritime Emergencies (CCME) in Cuxhaven. The German concept of emergency towing prescribes a maximum response time of two hours for any incident in German coastal waters. This requires three ETVs in the North Sea and five in the Baltic Sea despite a considerably smaller area to cover there. Equipment and performance of the vessels have been adapted to the size of the vessels in the respective areas of operation and include the ability to operate in shallow waters. Moreover, it is mandatory to have one vessel with 200 t of bollard pull and 100 t each in the North Sea and Baltic respectively. Both ship types are also required to be able to operate under hazardous conditions such as explosive areas and gas leaks.

Four out of the eight German ETVs are multi purpose vessels owned by the Federal Waterways and Shipping Administration and are part of the German Federal Coast Guard, while another four have been chartered from tug companies. Since 2001 a cooperation agreement with the Netherlands comprises the Dutch ETV and the German Nordic (successor to ETV Oceanic).

Current fleet:

North Sea

- Nordic: operating off the East Frisian Islands while based in Cuxhaven, bollard pull of 201 t
- Mellum: 5 nmi (9.3 km) southwest off Heligoland, bollard pull of 100 t
- Neuwerk: 5 nmi (9.3 km) southwest off Süderoogsand (Nordfriesland), bollard pull of 113 t

Baltic Sea

- Bülk: Kiel Fjord, bollard pull of 40 t
- Scharhörn: Hohwacht Bay (between Kiel and Fehmarn), bollard pull of 40 t
- Baltic: Warnemünde, 127 t of bollard pull.
- Arkona: Stralsund, bollard pull of 40 t
- Fairplay 25: Sassnitz, Rügen, bollard pull of 65 t

=== Iceland ===
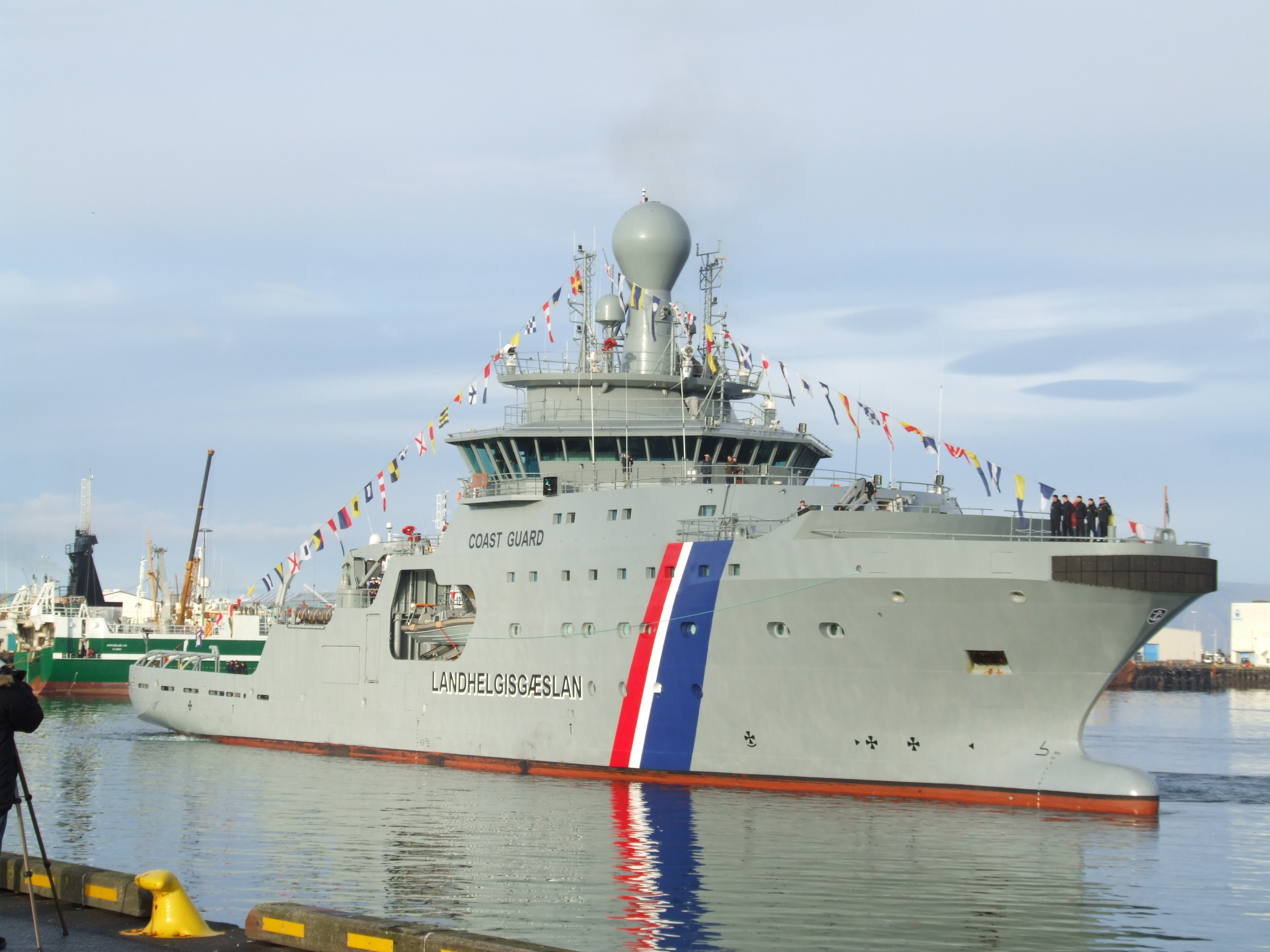
Icelandic offshore patrol vessel Thor

Iceland has the ICGV Þór. With a bollard pull of about 110 tonnes it has been specified so, that in case of emergency the new Icelandic Coast Guard vessel will be able to tow stricken tankers of up to about 200,000 dwt.

=== Netherlands ===
The Netherlands Coastguard operates one ETV on charter. She is based in Den Helder. As of April 2014, the Ievoli Amaranth is in operation and crewed by Svitzer Wijsmuller. Previously operated tugs are the Waker (former names: Smit Houston, Solo (Greenpeace)) and the Ievoli Black. A new charter contract is under construction.

The Waker was damaged by a fire and scrapped. The Ievoli Black was succeeded by the Ievoli Amaranth, which remains in operation as ETV until January 2016.

- Guardian (ex Ievoli Amaranth), 130 ton Bollard Pull, Den Helder
- Multraship Commander (ex ALP ACE), 192 ton Bollard Pull, Rotterdam
- Multraship Protector (ex ALP IPPON), 198 ton Bollard Pull, Terneuzen

=== Norway ===
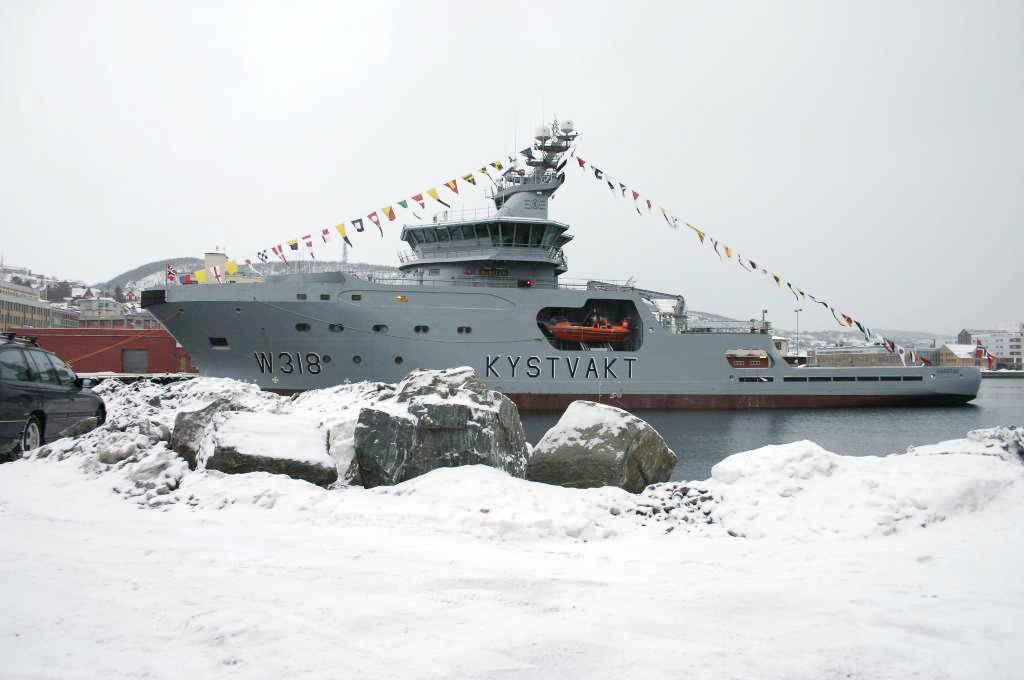
Norwegian multi-purpose vessel Harstad

The Norwegian Coast Guard owns three Barentshav class OPV multi-purpose vessels and operates another multi-purpose vessel named NoCGV Harstad on charter. Their main purpose is the prevention of pollution by oil tankers along the Norwegian coastline. Therefore, the ships can also be used in the ETV role with a bollard pull exceeding 100 tonnes. Norway also charters the following tugs:

- Beta, bollard pull of 118 t
- Normand Jarl, bollard pull of 150 t
- North Crusader, bollard pull of 144 t

=== Poland ===
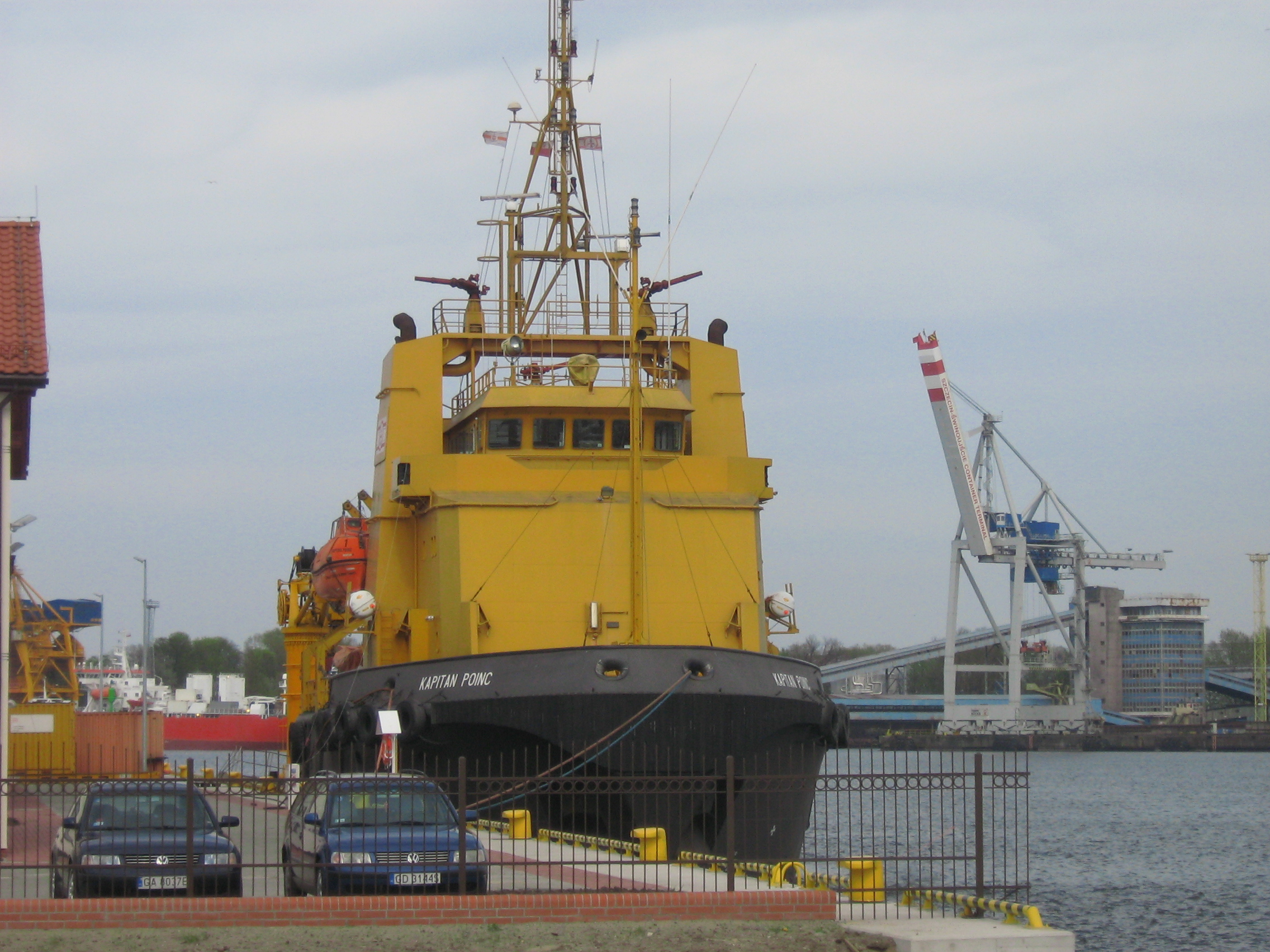
Polish ETV Kapitan Poinc

The Polish Ministry of Transport has organised a marine pollution-combatting service in Poland. It operates one ETV on charter, the tug Kapitan Poinc, bollard pull of 74 t.

=== South Africa ===
The tug Smit Amandla (bollard pull of 181 t) has been contracted for emergency towing. She is based in the port of Cape Town.

=== Spain ===
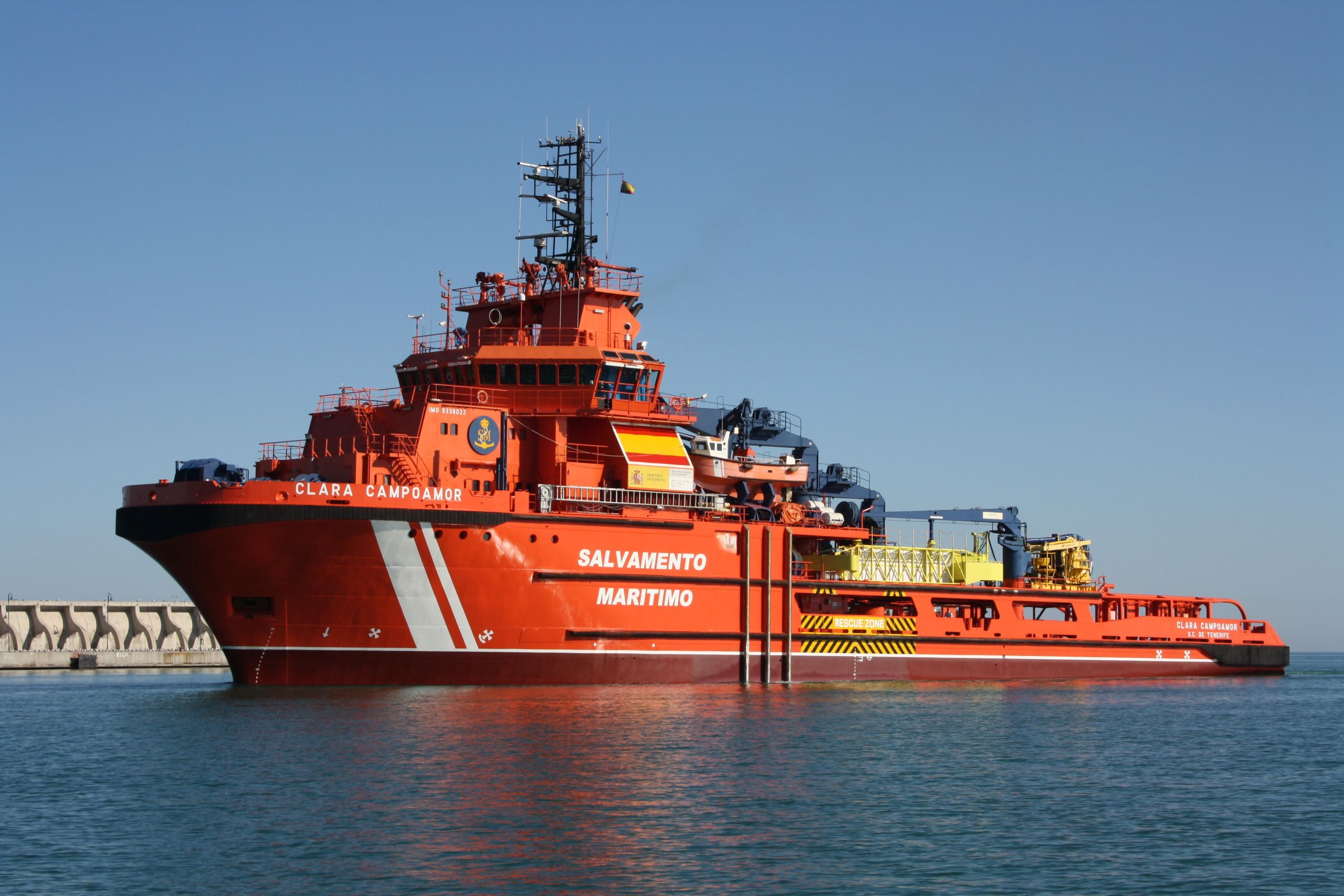
Spanish ETV Clara Campoamor, Don Inda class

The Sociedad de Salvamento y Seguridad Marítima has a total of 14 multi-purpose vessels for search and rescue and pollution prevention duties.

- Don Inda Class - 2 sister ETV's based on Ulstein's UT 722 L design (bollard pull of 228 t.)
- Luz de Mar Class - 2 sister ETV's (bollard pull of 128 t.)
- Alonso de Chaves - (bollard pull of 105 t.)
- Punta Salinas - (bollard pull of 97 t.)
- Punta Mayor - (bollard pull of 81 t.)
- María de Maeztu Class - 7 sister ETV's (bollard pull of 60 t.)

=== Sweden ===
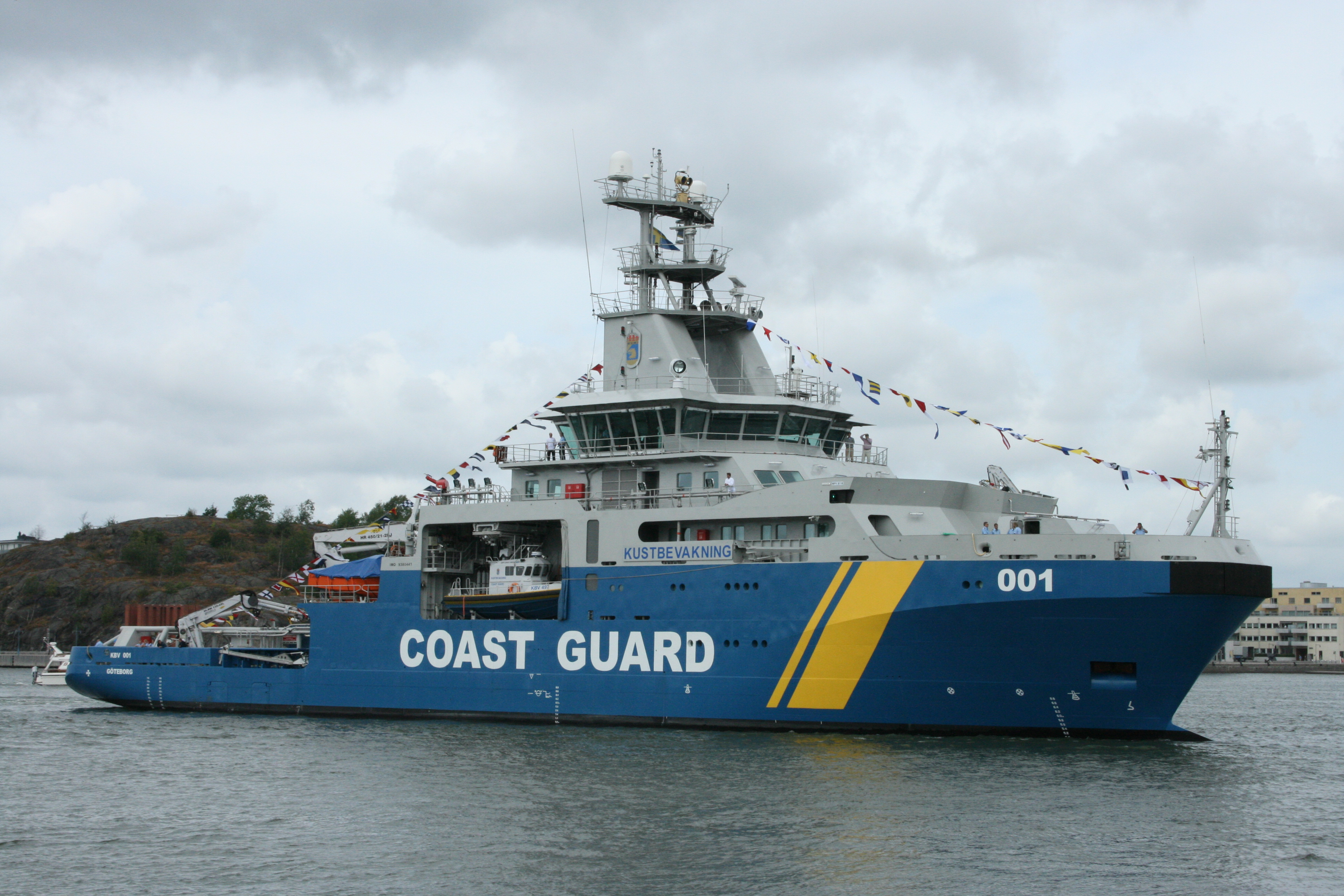
Swedish multi-purpose vessel Poseidon (KBV 001) in Gothenburg

The Swedish Coast Guard operates three EVT's of the same type. Built by Damen, these multifunctional patrol and emergency response vessels have a bollard pull of 100 tons. They were taken into operation during 2009 and 2010 and are operated by the Swedish Coast Guard.

- Poseidon (KBV 001), based in Gothenburg
- Triton (KBV 002), based in Slite on Gotland
- Amfitrite (KBV 009), based in Karlskrona

=== Turkey ===
The Turkish Directorate General of Coastal Safety operates 11 ETVs along with numerous SAR, oil spill response and fire fighting vessels at Bosphorus and Dardanelles, where the organization has a de jure monopoly for marine salvage along with the Sea of Marmara. Some of these ETVs also serve as escort tugs for vessels passing through Bosphorus and Dardanelles, which make up the Turkish Straits System, one of the busiest and dangerous seaways all around the world. The organisation also deals with navigational aids all around Turkey, SAR, pilotage at both straits and some other Turkish ports and most importantly Turkish Straits Vessel Traffic Systems.

- Gemi Kurtaran, bollard pull of 39 t
- Kurtarma 1, bollard pull of 53 t
- Kurtarma 2, bollard pull of 53 t
- Kurtarma 3, bollard pull of 70 t
- Kurtarma 4, bollard pull of 70 t
- Kurtarma 5, bollard pull of 65 t
- Kurtarma 6, bollard pull of 66 t
- Kurtarma 7, bollard pull of 60 t
- Kurtarma 8, bollard pull of 60 t
- Kurtarma 9, bollard pull of 105 t
- Kurtarma 10, bollard pull of 105 t
- Kurtarma 11, bollard pull of 75 t
- Kurtarma 12, bollard pull of 73 t
- Kurtarma 13, bollard pull of 82 t
- Kurtarma 14, bollard pull of 83 t
- Kurtarma 15, bollard pull of 91 t
- Kurtarma 16, bollard pull of 91 t
- Seyit Onbasi, Oil spill response vessel
- Nene Hatun, bollard pull of 205 t

=== United Kingdom ===
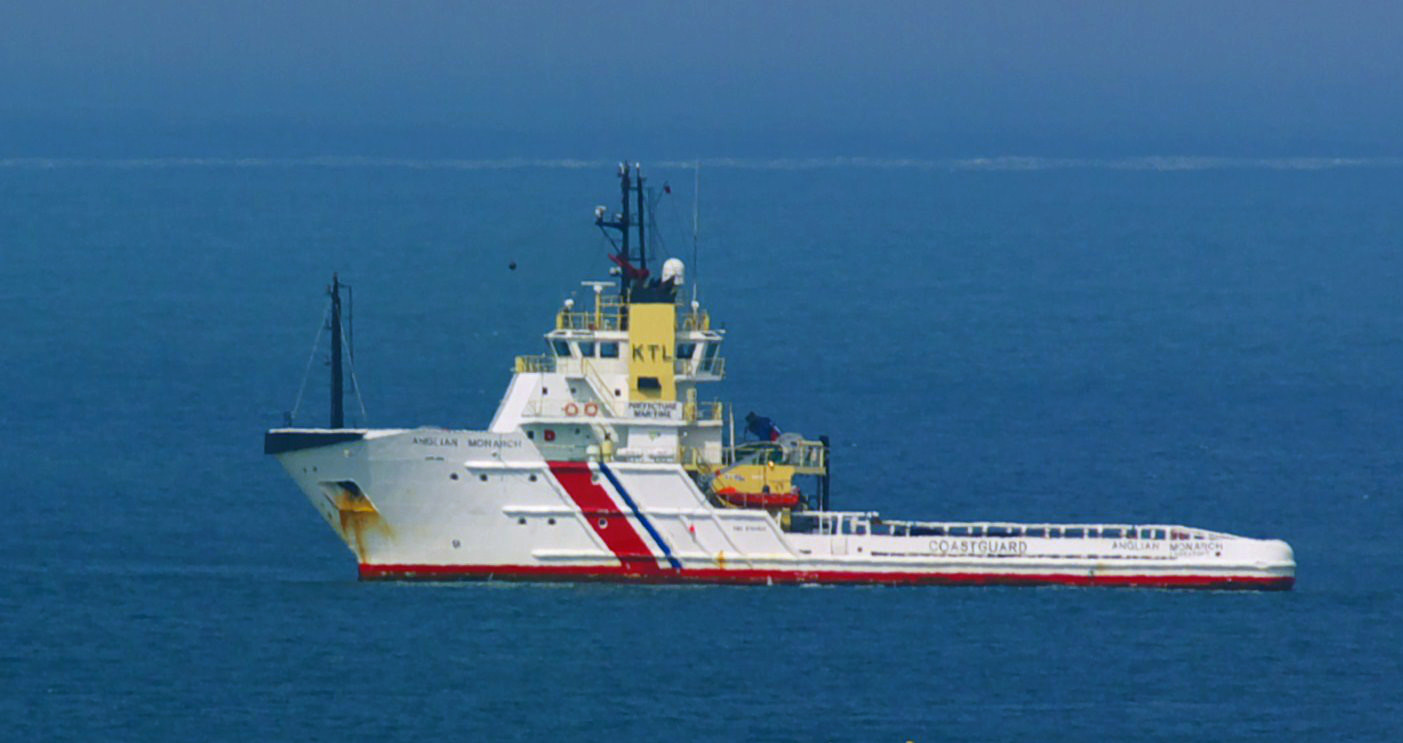
British ETV Anglian Monarch

The UK's ETV vessels were chartered by the Maritime and Coastguard Agency (MCA) for use in pollution control or towing vessels that were in difficulty. The vessels are a combination of tugboat, anchor handler, fireboat and buoy tender.

As of 2010, four ETVs, Anglian Prince, Anglian Princess, Anglian Sovereign and Anglian Monarch, were based in strategic locations around the UK, with two covering the south coast of England, at Falmouth in Cornwall and Dover in Kent, and two in Scottish waters, at Stornoway the Western Isles (the Outer Hebrides), and Lerwick in the Northern Isles (Shetland and Orkney). The four strong ETV fleet was intended to be operational 24 hours a day 365 days a year and maintained at 30 minutes readiness to sail, with one tug is allocated to each of the four operating areas on a rotational basis, worked around maintenance schedules. The Dover station was funded jointly with French maritime authorities. A fifth tug, the Anglian Earl, was an anchorhandling and salvage tug regularly used on commercial work, but also fitted the ETV criteria, and acted as cover for any of the four ETV stations as and when required.

In 2010, the Government announced as part of the Department for Transport's share of cuts in the Comprehensive Spending Review, that the ETV fleet would be no longer be funded by the MCA from September 2011, saving £32.5m over the Spending Review period. The Department stated that "state provision of ETVs does not represent a correct use of taxpayers money and that ship salvage should be a commercial matter between a ship's operator and the salvor".

On 30 September 2011 it was however announced that the two ETVs operating in the Minch and the Shetland Islands received a moratorium of three months with an interim funding by the United Kingdom's government.
