= Theodor Puschmann =

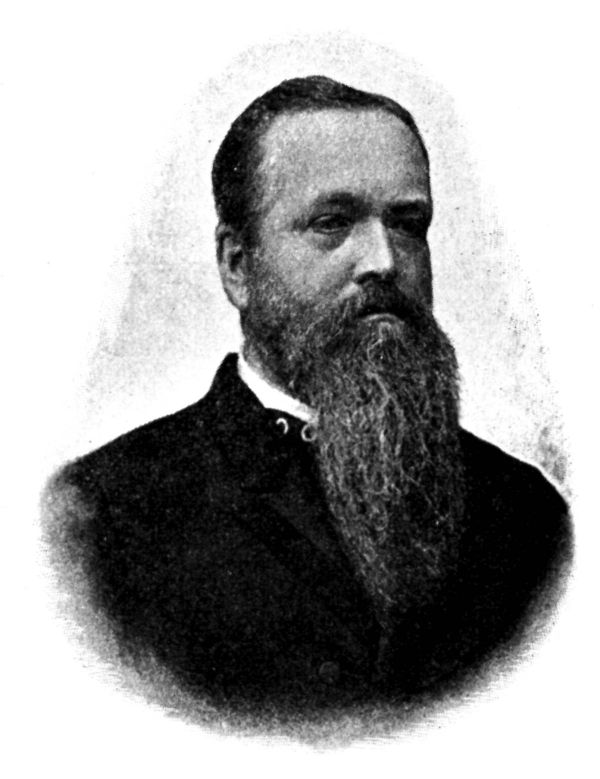
- Born: May 4, 1844
- Died: September 28, 1899 (aged 55)
- Education: University of Marburg
- Scientific career
- Fields: History of medicine

Theodor Puschmann (4 May 1844 – 28 September 1899) was a German psychiatrist and one of the founders of the history of medicine as a discipline. His "diagnosis" of Richard Wagner's supposed mental illness was a significant contribution to the idea of degenerate music.

== Life and work ==
Theodor Puschmann was born at Lowenberg in Prussian Silesia. He studied medicine in Berlin, Marburg, Vienna and Munich. He qualified in medicine at Marburg in 1869. He continued his medical training in England, France and Italy and spent a year as a physician in Egypt. In the Franco-Prussian War of 1870-1 he worked as a doctor in the reserves. In 1872 he began to practise in Munich and developed an interest in psychiatry under the influence of Bernhard von Gudden.

In 1872 Puschmann published Richard Wagner: eine psychiatrische Studie, which set out the ways in which he believed the composer was suffering from mental illness, including persecution mania and sexual depravity. The book kicked off decades of speculation about Wagner's morals and medical condition, and the debate on degenerate music.

In 1879 he became Professor of the History of Medicine in Vienna. His most significant publications in the history of medicine include Die Medicin in Wien während der letzten hundert Jahre (1884) and Die Geschichte der Lehre von der Ansteckung (1895). His Handbuch der Geschichte der Medizin (1902-05) was "one of the most important books on the subject, ranking with the work of Haeser" and "many authorities collaborated in the writing of the histories of the various subjects treated".

He left his legacy and his library as the basis of museum of medical history.

In 1896 he wrote a highly autobiographical novel entitled Leonie.

== Selected writings ==
Ueber die Therapie der Peritonitis. Marburg 1869 (Dissertation).
Richard Wagner. Eine psychiatrische Studie. Berlin 1873.
Alexander von Tralles. Amsterdam 1963.
Die Medicin in Wien während der letzten hundert Jahre. Wien 1884.
Nachträge zu Alexander Trallianus: Fragmente aus Philumenus und Philagrius nebst einer bisher nach ungedruckten Abhandlung über Augenkrankheiten. Berlin 1886.
Geschichte des medicinischen Unterrichts von den ältesten Zeiten bis zur Gegenwart. Leipzig 1889.
Zu Ostern in Spanien, Reiseschilderungen. Breslau 1893.
Die Geschichte der Lehre von der Ansteckung. Wien 1895.
Handbuch der Geschichte der Medizin. Jena 1902–1905.
