= Danish Sea Rescue Society =

- Dansk Søredningsselskab
- Abbreviation: DSRS
- Formation: 2004
- Type: Non-governmental organization
- Legal status: Charity
- Purpose: Sea Rescue
- Headquarters: Helsingør, Capital Region of Denmark
- Region served: Denmark
- Members: International Maritime Rescue Federation
- Official language: Danish
- Volunteers: approx. 170
- Website: dsrs.dk

The Danish Sea Rescue Society (DSRS) (in Danish: Dansk Søredningsselskab) is a voluntary organization that assists sailors in Danish waters in non-life threatening situations and can be called in by the Danish authorities for Search and Rescue (SAR) operations.

Founded in 2004 as a charitable non-governmental organization its self-prescribed mission is to alleviate critical situations at sea by providing "pro-active sea rescue" (in Danish forebyggende søredning). Thereby it relies on donations and membership fees for financing. DSRS operates mainly in the Danish Straits, with stations in Årøsund, Bregnør, Copenhagen, Helsingør, Juelsminde, Kerteminde, Køge, Lynæs, Løgstør, Rudkøbing and Vordingborg. It is a full member of the International Maritime Rescue Federation (IMRF).

In 2019 the Danish Sea Rescue Society carried out 599 operations, all of them in coordination with or directly requested by the Danish Joint Rescue Coordination Center (JRCC Danmark) in Aarhus. The operations range from the towing of stranded or otherwise disabled vessels to searching for missing persons.

== See also ==
- German Maritime Search and Rescue Service – German equivalent
- Norwegian Society for Sea Rescue – Norwegian equivalent
- Royal National Lifeboat Institution – British equivalent
- Royal Netherlands Sea Rescue Institution – Dutch equivalent
- Société Nationale de Sauvetage en Mer – French equivalent
- Swedish Sea Rescue Society – Swedish equivalent
