= Lebanese Marine Rescue Unit =

Marine Rescue Unit
- Type: Life savers
- Legal status: A voluntary government organization, firmly integrated within the structure of the Lebanese Civil Defense.
- Purpose: Search and rescue operations, marine environment preservation, and firefighting at sea.
- Headquarters: Kaslik, Jounieh
- Region served: Lebanon
- Official language: Arabic
- President: Samir Yazbek
- Volunteers: 200
- Website: http://www.civildefense.gov.lb/

The Marine Rescue Unit, founded by Samir Yazbek in. 1999, is an integral component of the Lebanese Civil Defense and a dedicated volunteer organization with a primary mission of safeguarding lives in the maritime domain along the Lebanese coastline. Operating from nine coastal stations and comprising 200 personnel—both full-time employees and volunteers—the unit’s core duties include maritime search and rescue, combating maritime fires and upholding the preservation of the marine environment.

== Stations ==
Map of Lebanon showing the Marine Rescue Stations of the Lebanese Civil Defense (Click on base icon for link to details)

The Marine Rescue Unit of the Lebanese Civil Defense operates from 9 strategically positioned stations to ensure comprehensive coverage of the 200 kilometers of the Lebanese coastline:

- Al Abdeh Marine Rescue Station: Situated approximately 100 kilometers to the north of Beirut in the North Governorate.
- Batroun Marine Rescue Station: Situated approximately 50 kilometers to the north of Beirut in the North Governorate.
- Amchit Marine Rescue Station: Located about 40 kilometers north of Beirut in the Mount Lebanon Governorate.
- Kaslik Marine Rescue Station (Unit Headquarters): Serving as the central command and coordination hub for the Sea Rescue Unit, this station is positioned around 20 kilometers north of Beirut in the Mount Lebanon Governorate.
- Ras Beirut Marine Rescue Station: Situated in the Beirut Governorate.
- Damour Marine Rescue Station: Positioned approximately 20 kilometers south of Beirut in the Mount Lebanon Governorate.
- Jiyeh Marine Rescue Station: Positioned approximately 30 kilometers south of Beirut in the Mount Lebanon Governorate.
- Tyre Marine Rescue Station: Located around 75 kilometers to the south of Beirut in the South Governorate.

== Equipment ==
The Marine Rescue Unit of the Lebanese Civil Defense is responsible for maritime search and rescue operations along Lebanon’s coastline. As of 2025, the unit’s fleet comprised 25 boats—including inflatable boats, patrol craft and rescue launches—though economic constraints have rendered the majority non-operational:

- High-Speed Boats: Several high-speed boats, some of which are outfitted with small water cannons for external firefighting operations.
- Inflatable Boats: These versatile craft are essential for swift, agile responses in various maritime situations.
- Personal Watercraft: Personal watercraft are employed for rapid deployment and maneuverability during rescue missions.

Furthermore, the unit maintains a comprehensive array of diving equipment for underwater operations and possesses specialized resources for responding to oil pollution incidents. These resources include various types of containment booms to mitigate the impact of oil spills on the marine environment.

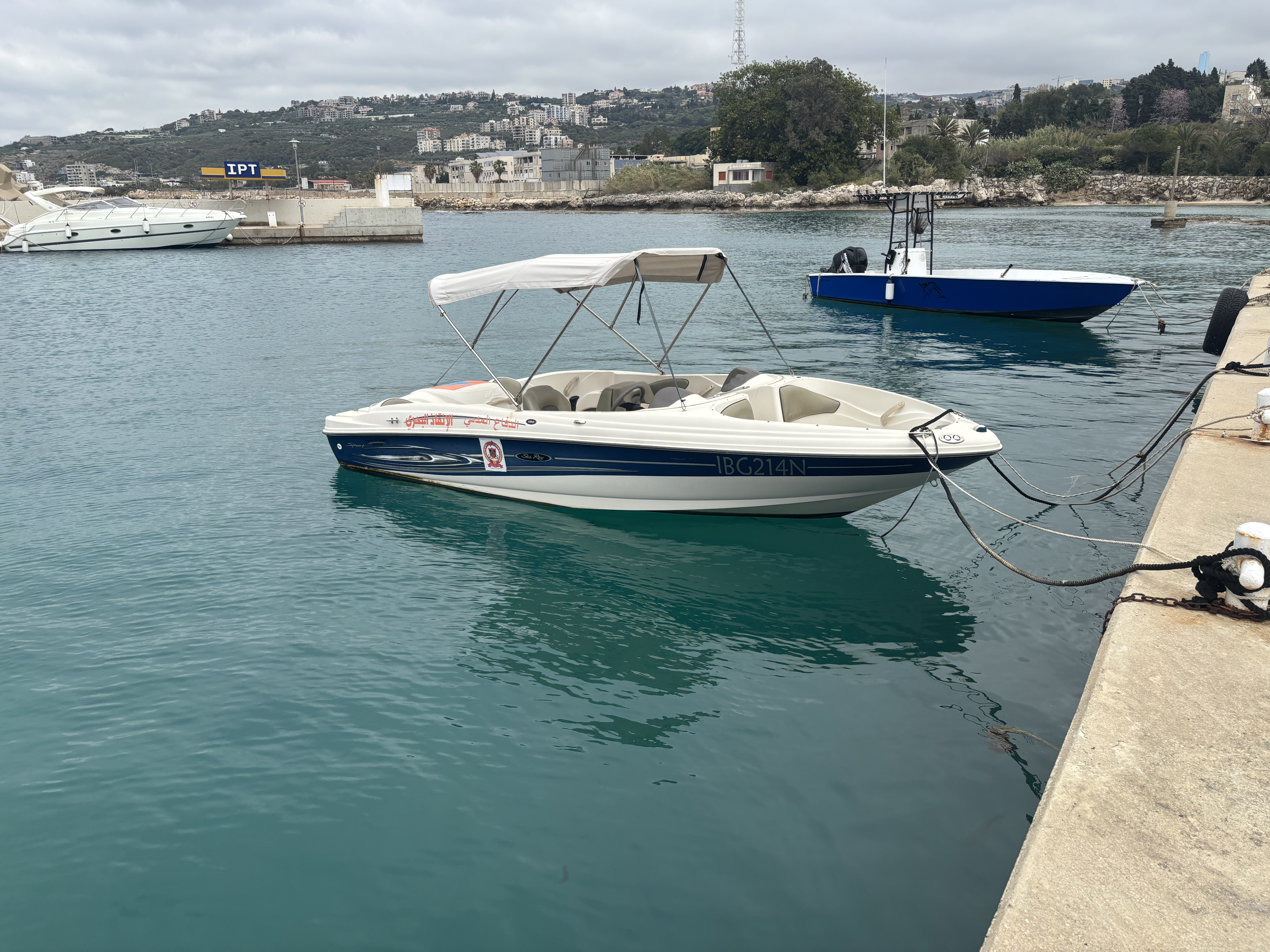
A boat of the Lebanese Marine Rescue Unit - Amchit Fishing Port

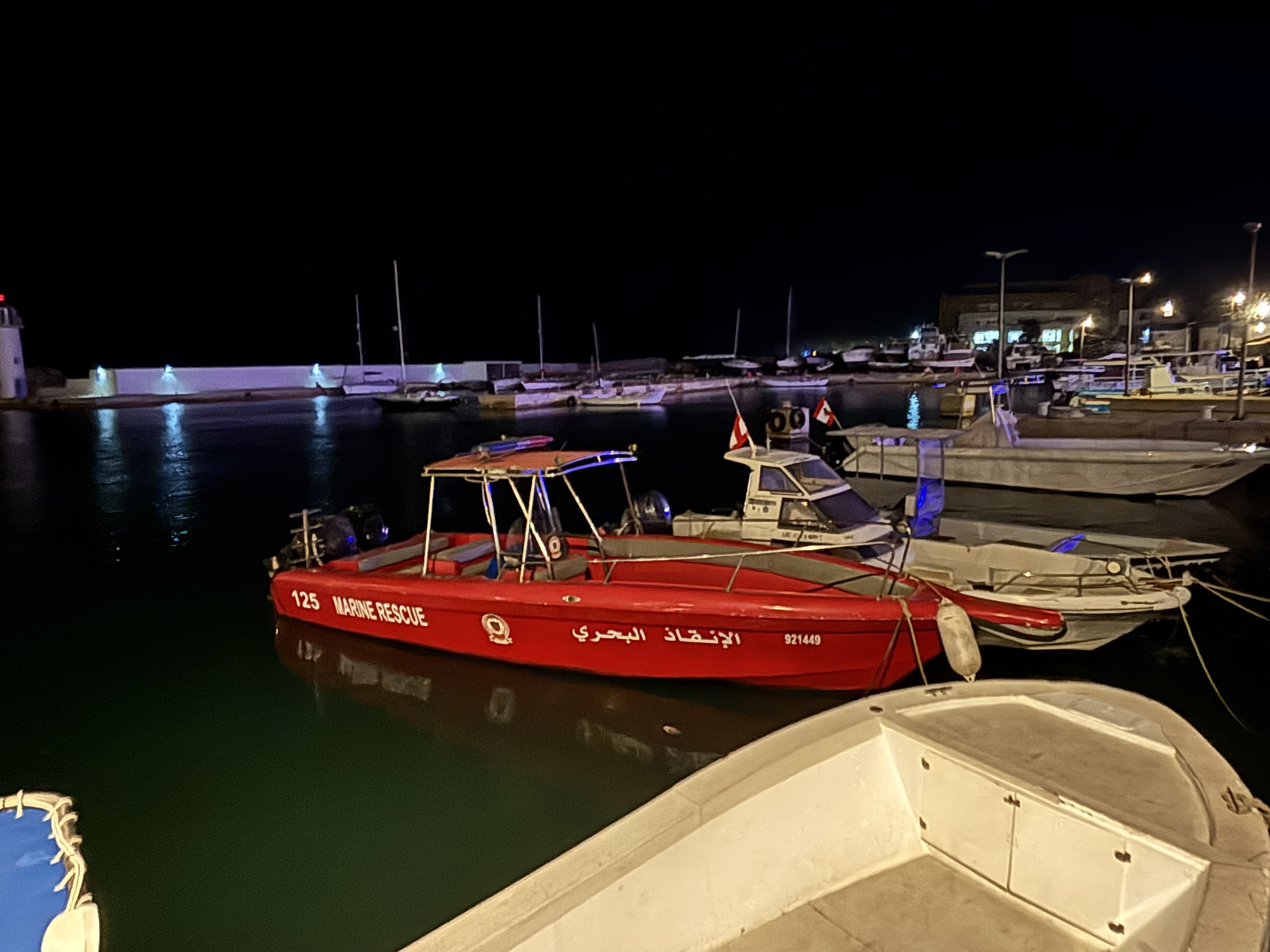
A boat of the Lebanese Marine Rescue Unit - Batroun Old Port

== See also ==
- German Maritime Search and Rescue Service
- Koninklijke Nederlandse Redding Maatschappij
- Redningsselskapet
- Royal National Lifeboat Institution
- Sociedad de Salvamento y Seguridad Marítima
- Société Nationale de Sauvetage en Mer
- Swedish Sea Rescue Society
- US Coast Guard
