= Netherlands Coastguard =

Maritime law enforcement branch of the Royal Netherlands Navy

Netherlands Coastguard Kustwacht Nederland
- Netherlands Coast Guard emblem

- Ensign

- Racing stripe
- Motto: Servamus Servientes

Agency overview
- Formed: February 26, 1987
- Annual budget: €64,258,000 (2020)

Jurisdictional structure
- Operations jurisdiction: Netherlands
- Constituting instrument: Regulation on organization of Netherlands Coastguard, 2019
- Specialist jurisdiction: Coastal patrol, marine border protection, marine search and rescue

Operational structure
- Elected officer responsible: Ruben Brekelmans, Minister of Defense
- Agency executive: Nicole Kuipers, Director
- Parent agency: Royal Netherlands Navy

Website
- www.kustwacht.nl

The Netherlands Coastguard (Dutch: Kustwacht Nederland) is a civil organisation that carries out tasks on the Netherlands North Sea for six Ministries under administration of the Royal Netherlands Navy. Its operational command falls under the Ministry of Defence, and the Royal Netherlands Navy is responsible for its coordination.

The headquarters of the Netherlands Coastguard is located in Den Helder, and the director is former naval commander Nicole Kuipers.

== History ==
While the Netherlands Coastguard was officially established on 26 February 1987, a less formal Dutch coastguard had been active since 1883. In 1882 the gunboat HNLMS Adder sunk off Scheveningen with the death of all 65 aboard. The public outcry that followed led to reforms, including an improved system of observing, reporting and assisting ships in distress off the coast, with better cooperation between lighthouses and government agencies.

After World War II the area that could be covered off-coast became larger with new technologies such as radar and better means of communication. At the same time, government desire to protect Dutch interests in the North Sea, such as fishery, and extraction of oil, gas, sand and gravel, led to each ministry establishing its own department with, at one point, over twenty government organisations at work off the Dutch coast. To stop this fragmentation, in 1984 Minister Smit-Kroes of Traffic and water management ordered a review to examine how to make guarding the coast of the Netherlands more efficient and effective. The results of this review were published in 1986 and led to the creation of a single coastguard agency, namely the Netherlands Coastguard.

Initially, the Coast Guard headquarters was housed in a building belonging to the coast radio station Scheveningen Radio in IJmuiden. In 1995 the Coast Guard was assigned to the Ministry of Defense and on 23 November 2001 the headquarters moved to the Royal Netherlands Navy's Command in Den Helder.

== Organisation ==
The Netherlands Coastguard carries out duties for six government ministries, these ministries are the:

- Ministry of Infrastructure and Water Management
- Ministry of Defence
- Ministry of Justice and Security
- Ministry of Finance
- Ministry of Economic Affairs
- Ministry of Agriculture, Fisheries, Food Security and Nature

=== JRCC Den Helder ===
The Kustwachtcentrum (English: Coastguard Center) in Den Helder is also the Netherlands Joint Rescue Coordination Center (JRCC Den Helder, Call DEN HELDER RESCUE). It coordinates not only sea rescue (MRCC) but also air rescue (ARCC). Emergency calls in the monitored area of the North Sea and the airspace of the Netherlands are recorded at all times. A back office, which has access to the various databases of the authorities involved, serves to support the front office. For the SAR services, the lifeboats of the Koninklijke Nederlandse Redding Maatschappij (KNRM) get coordinated. A new Kustwachtcentrum is expected to open in March 2027 and will be located at the Niewe haven.

== Tasks ==
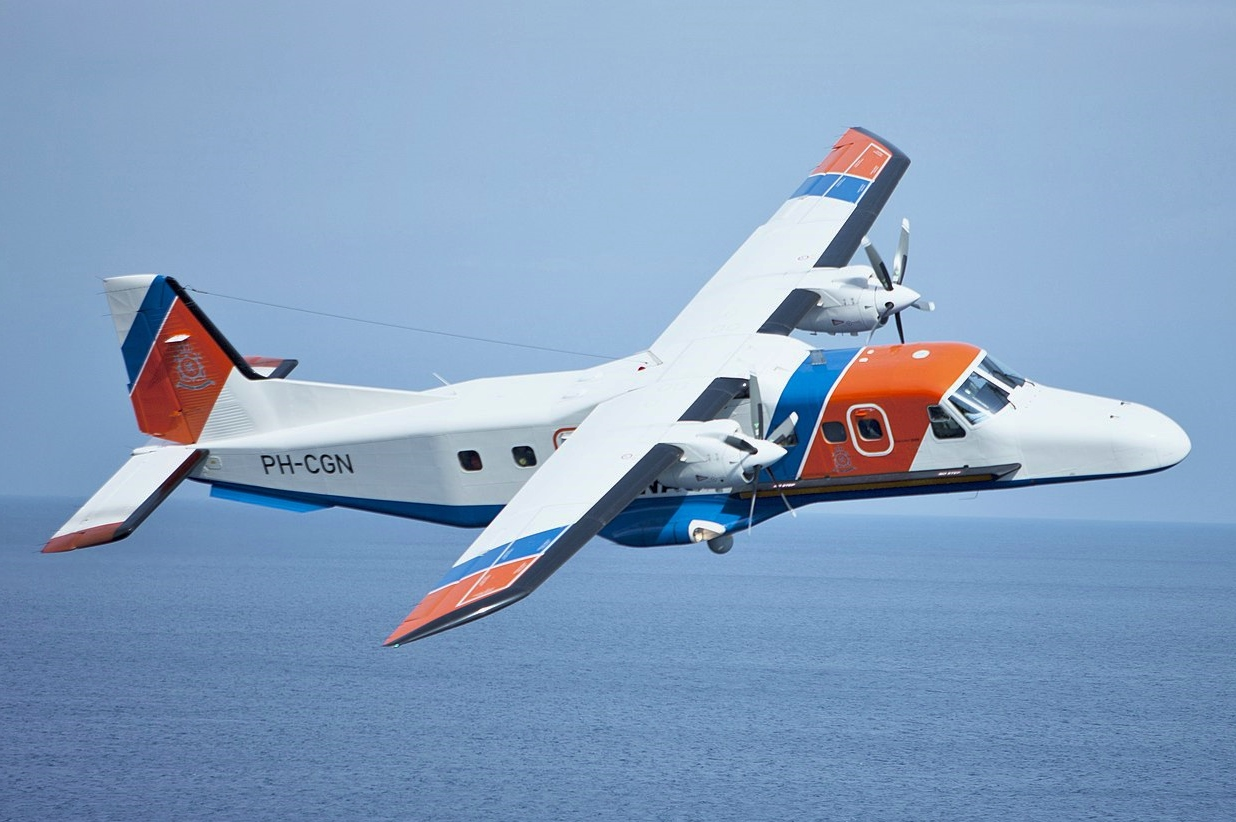
Netherlands Coastguard Dornier 228 arrives for the Royal International Air Tattoo, England, UK (2014)

The Coastguard tasks can be divided into Provision of service tasks and Law enforcement tasks.

- Provision of service tasks:
  - Monitoring, handling and coordinating national and international Distress, Urgency and Safety radio traffic
  - Maritime assistance and Search and Rescue
  - Limiting and dealing with the aftermath of disasters and incidents
  - Wherever necessary, implementing vessel traffic services (buoys, vessel traffic service, instructions)
  - Maritime traffic research
- Law enforcement tasks:
  - Maintaining law and order (police)
  - Monitoring import, export and transit of goods (customs)
  - Upholding laws regarding environment, sea fishing, nautical traffic, ships equipment and offshore activities
  - Border control

== Equipment ==
=== Vessels ===
The Coast Guard has no vessels of its own, so resources are made available by the cooperating ministries and services

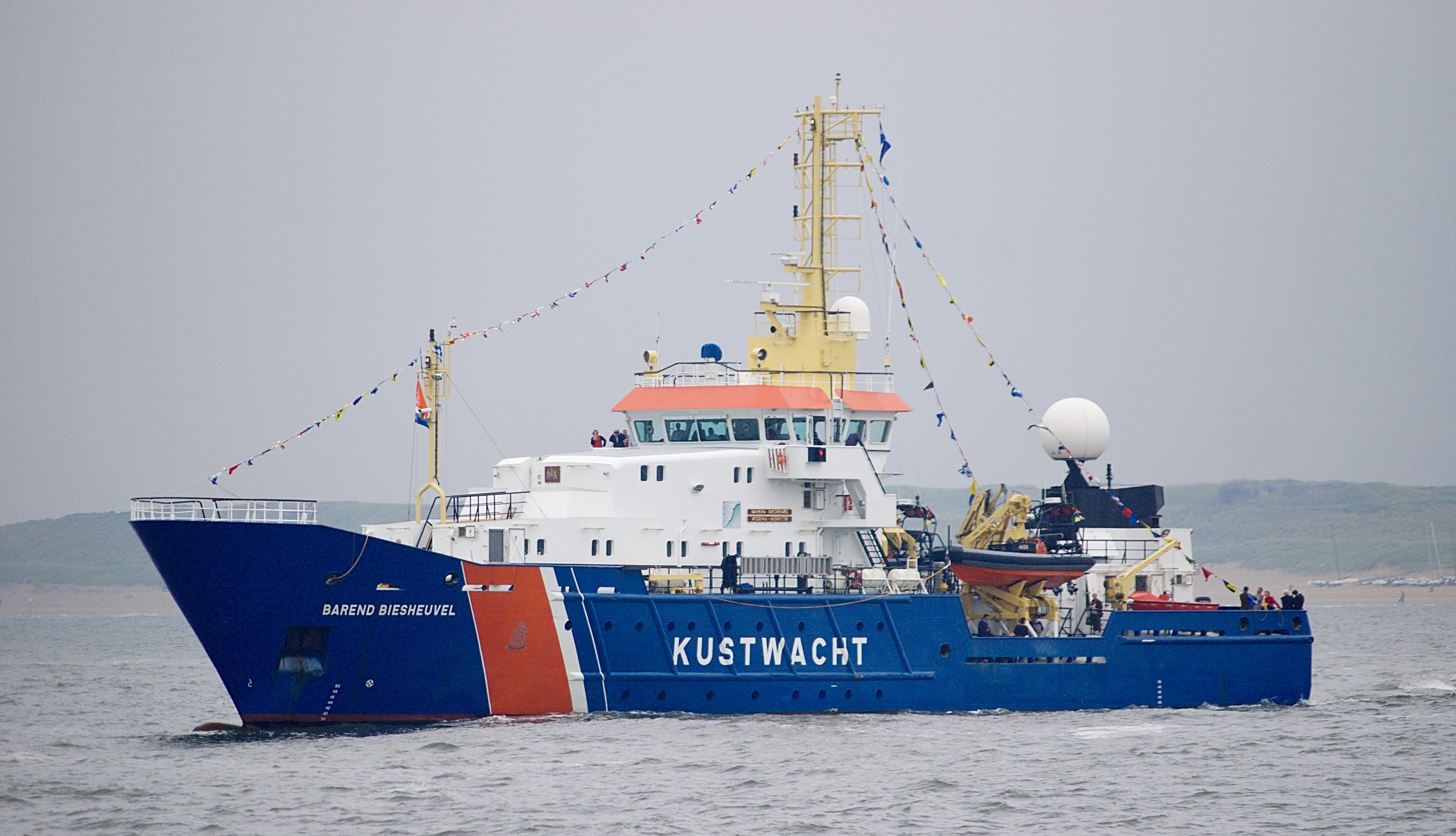
The Barend Biesheuvel Coast Guard vessel

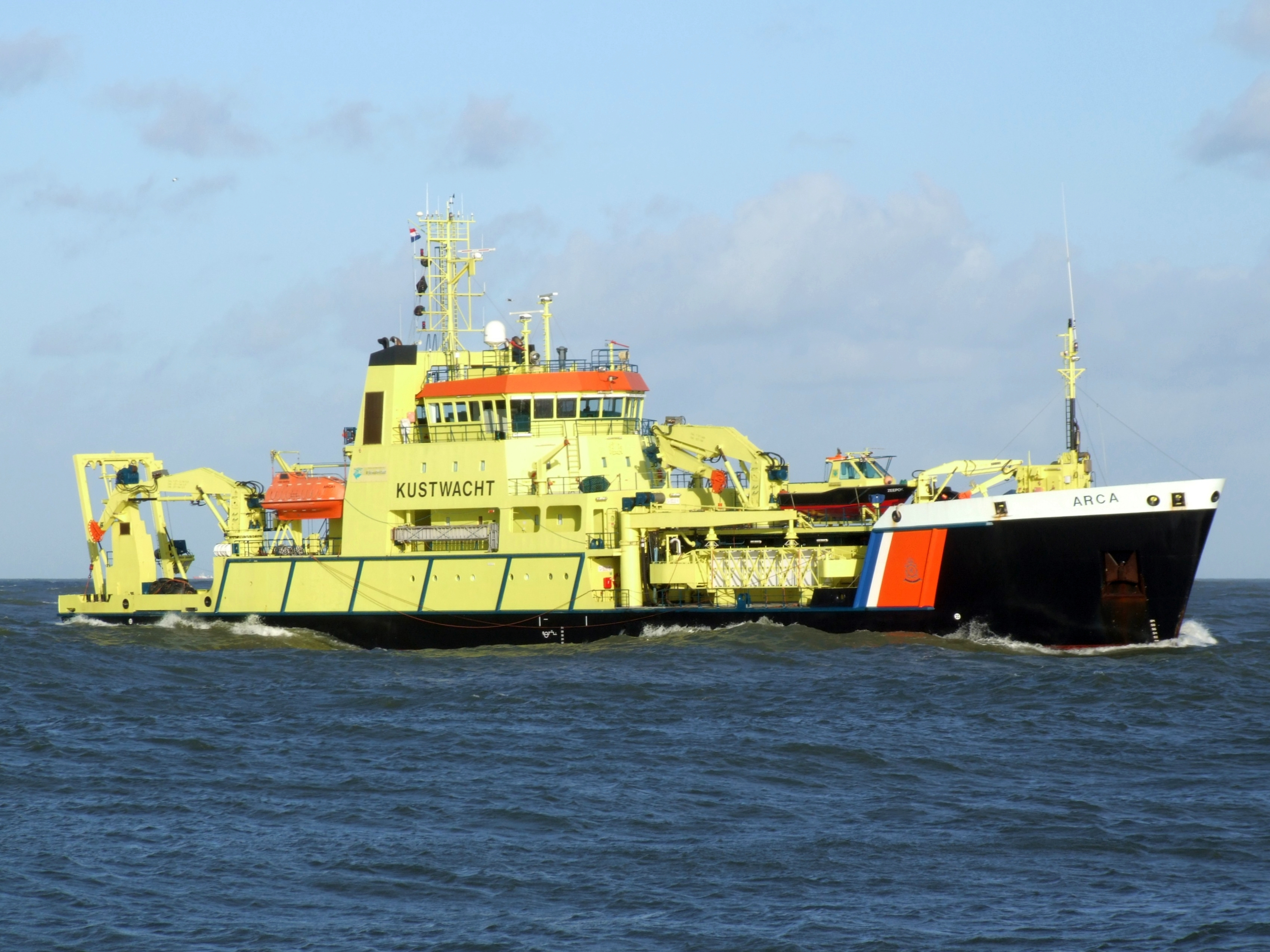
The Arca multi-purpose vessel

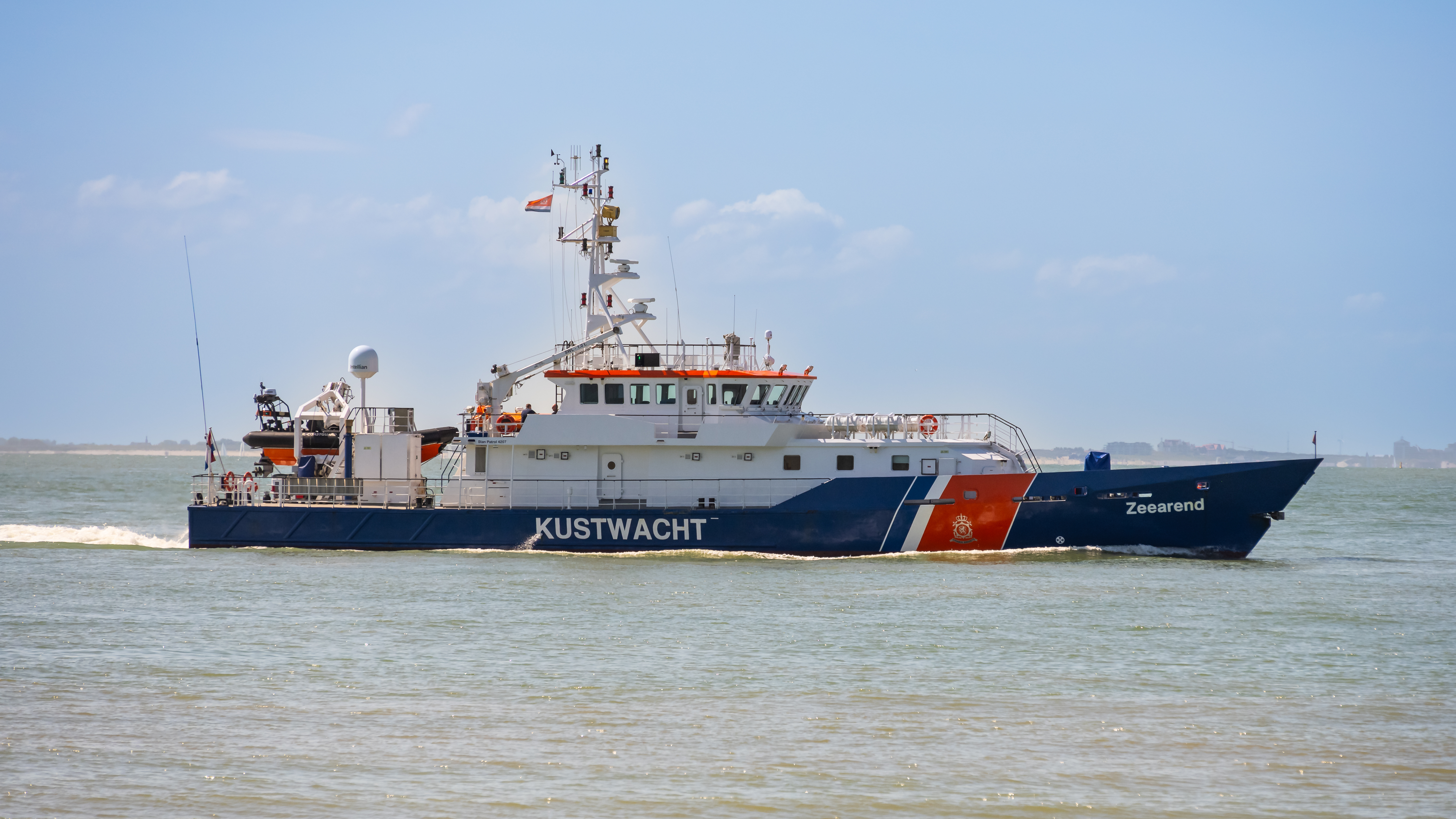
The Zeearend patrol vessel

Vessel(s)	Origin	Type	Owner
Arca	Netherlands	Multi-purpose vessel	Rijkswaterstaat
Barend Biesheuvel	Netherlands	Patrol boat	Rijkswaterstaat
Frans Naerebout	Netherlands	Buoy tender	Rijkswaterstaat
Guardian	Netherlands	Towing vessel	Multraship
Multraship Commander	Netherlands	Shipping safety	Multraship
Multraship Protector	Netherlands	Shipping safety	Multraship
P41	Netherlands	Patrol boat	Dutch National Police
P42	Netherlands	Patrol boat	Dutch National Police
P44	Netherlands	Patrol boat	Dutch National Police
P45	Netherlands	Patrol boat	Dutch National Police
Various classes of lifeboat*	Netherlands	Lifeboat	Royal Netherlands Sea Rescue Institution
RHIB's (Aboard other vessels)*	Netherlands	Speedboat	Rijkswaterstaat
Rotterdam	Netherlands	Buoy tender	Rijkswaterstaat
Terschelling	Netherlands	Buoy tender	Rijkswaterstaat
Visarend	Netherlands	Patrol boat	Rijkswaterstaat
Zeearend	Netherlands	Patrol boat	Rijkswaterstaat
Waddenstroom	Netherlands	Multi-purpose vessel	Rijkswaterstaat (lent per case)
Merwestroom	Netherlands	Multi-purpose vessel	Rijkswaterstaat (lent per case)
Scheldestroom	Netherlands	Multi-purpose vessel	Rijkswaterstaat (lent per case)

* = Multiple smaller vessels as opposed to one vessel.

== See also ==
- Dutch Caribbean Coast Guard
- Dutch National Police
- Rijkswaterstaat
- Royal Netherlands Sea Rescue Institution
- Tax and Customs Administration
