= Harry Haerendel =

German artist

Harry Louis Haerendel (14 July 1893 – 16 November 1982) was a Hamburg born German artist.

His most widely known work is his Der alte Seebär (lit. "The Old Sea Bear", also known in Scandinavia as Fiskargubben, lit. "The Old Fisherman") picturing a bearded old sailor with a pensive countenance in a sou'wester smoking a pipe.

There is a popular myth that, rather than being a fisherman, it is a picture of the Dutch lifeboatman Dorus Rijkers. This has turned out to be false, though. In an interview late in his life, in the 18 September 1982 issue of the newspaper Münsterländische Tageszeitung, Harry Haerendel said that the portrait is of a fisherman he met at the Finkenwerder harbor.

Prints of this work were very popular in the mid to late 20th century in Scandinavia and has been described as a noted example of kitsch art.
