= Lebanese Civil Defense =

Lebanese public emergency medical service

- المديرية العامة للدفاع المدني

Civil Defence overview
- Superseding Civil Defence: Ministry of Interior and Municipalities
- Jurisdiction: Lebanon
- Website: www.civildefense.gov.lb

The Lebanese Civil Defense officially known as the General Directorate of the Lebanese Civil Defense is a public emergency medical service of Lebanon that carries out patient transportation, search and rescue activities and fire-fighting response.

It is funded and administered by the Ministry of Interior and Municipalities (Lebanon). The directorate works in conjunction with the Lebanese Red Cross along with other pre-hospital service organizations in the country. The current Director General of the Lebanese Civil Defence is General Raymond Khattar.

== See also ==
Lebanese Defense forces related topics:

- Lebanese Sea Rescue Unit
- Ministry of National Defense
- Lebanese Air Force
- Lebanese Navy
- Lebanese Special Forces
- Lebanese Red Cross

Civil Defence related topics:

- Blast shelter
- Civil-defense Geiger counters
- Civil defense siren
- Effects of nuclear explosions on human health
- Emergency management
- Fallout shelter
- Nuclear warfare
- Survivalism
- Transarmament
- Weapon of mass destruction
- Civil defense by country

== Bibliography ==
- "7 Things You Probably Didn't Know About Lebanon's Civil Defense". www.the961.com. 2019-03-19.
- ThemeLooks. "Civil Defense : Big Responsibilities and Modest Resources". monthlymagazine.com.
- "UNIFIL donates firefighting and rescue assets to Lebanese Civil Defense - SFFECO".
