= Swedish Sea Rescue Society =

Flag of the SSRS

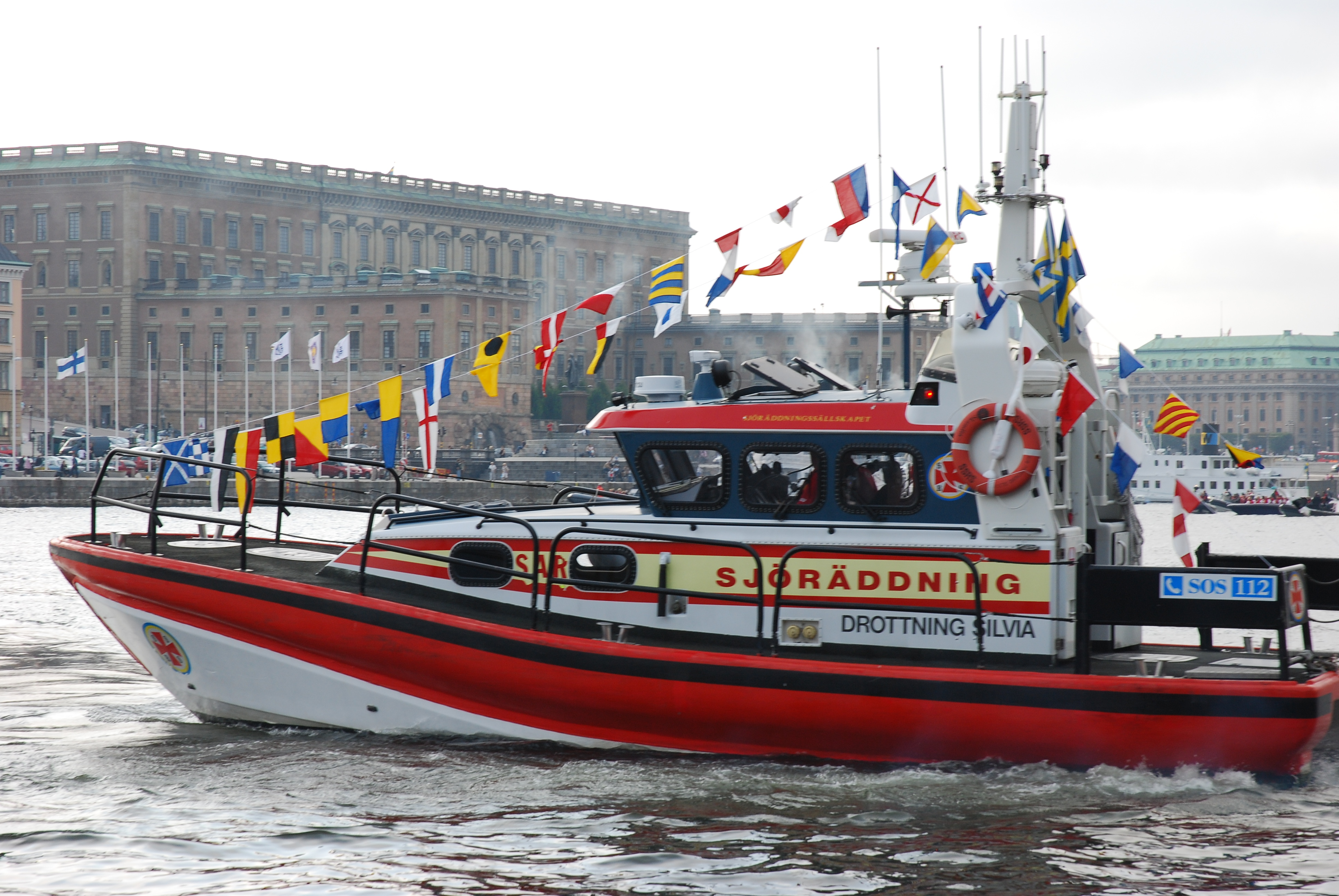
The 12 metre Victoria-class rescue vessel in central Stockholm, Sweden

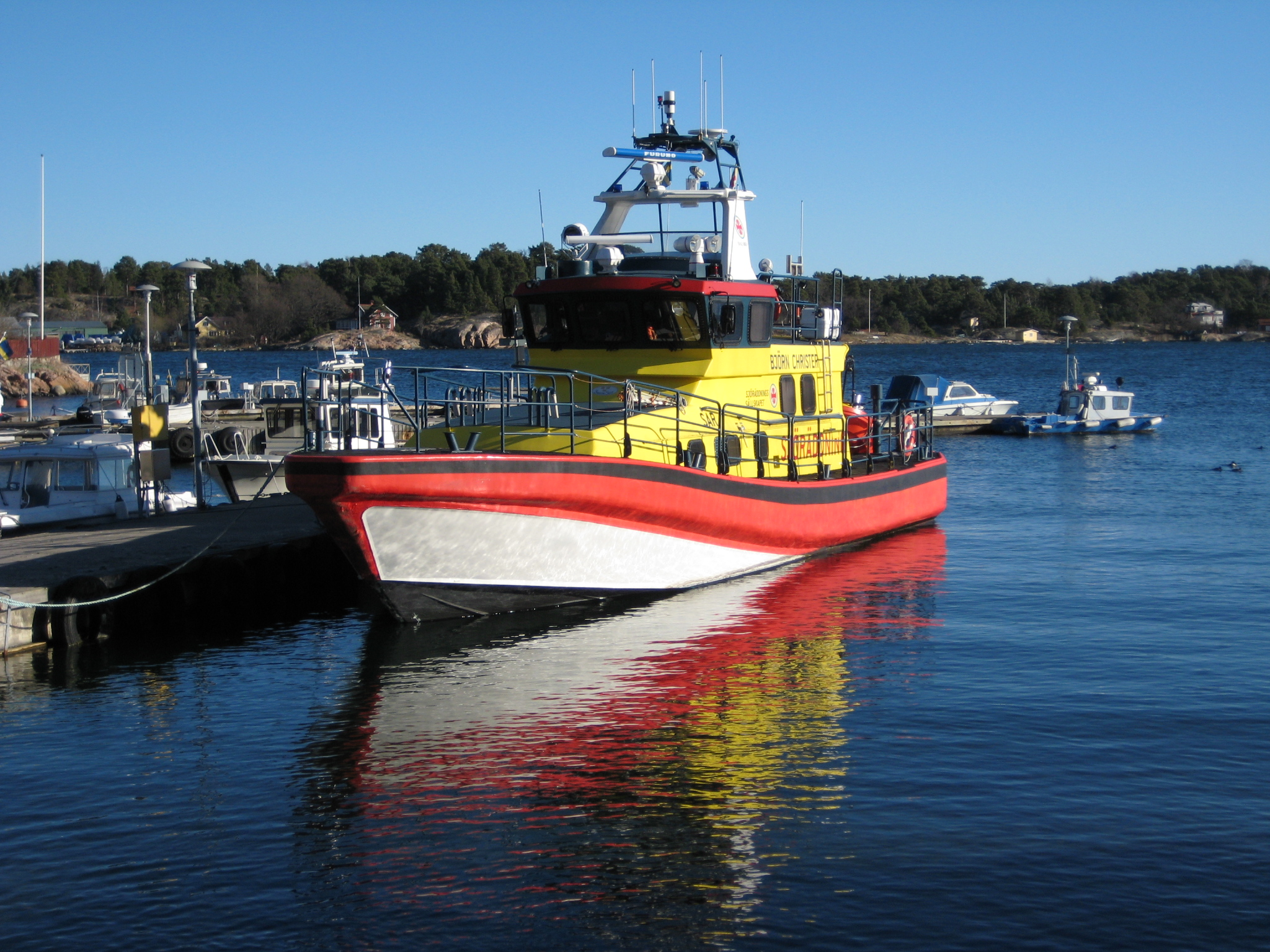
The 20 metre Rausing-class rescue cruiser Björn Christer, Dalarö, Sweden

The Swedish Sea Rescue Society (Swedish: Sjöräddningssällskapet, SSRS), formally the Swedish Society for the Saving of Shipwrecked Persons (Swedish: Svenska Sällskapet för Räddning af Skeppsbrutne) is a Swedish voluntary organisation that works with maritime search and rescue on Swedish lakes and seas. The society runs 70 lifeboat stations, with over 200 rescue vessels and over 2100 volunteers. Of these, more than 300 are on call at any given moment, and can respond to an emergency call within 15 minutes. It is a member of the International Maritime Rescue Federation (IMRF)

The society was founded in 1907 at the Hotel Rydberg in Stockholm. The organisation is completely non-profit, and receives no government funding but is instead funded entirely by donations and membership fees. SSRS carries out more than 70% of all emergency calls in Sweden and its territorial waters.

Under an agreement with the Swedish Maritime Administration the purpose of the society is:

- to maintain an interest in maritime search and rescue
- to suggest measures to improve service in this area
- to manage individual search and rescue operations within Swedish waters

The society also provides technical advice in areas where there may not be an immediate danger.

Between 1982 and 1991 the society produced its own coins, with a face value of 25 Swedish kronor. Since 2001 money has been received from the Swedish Postcode Lottery, which in 2009 totalled 21.5 million Swedish crowns.

== The fleet of SSRS ==
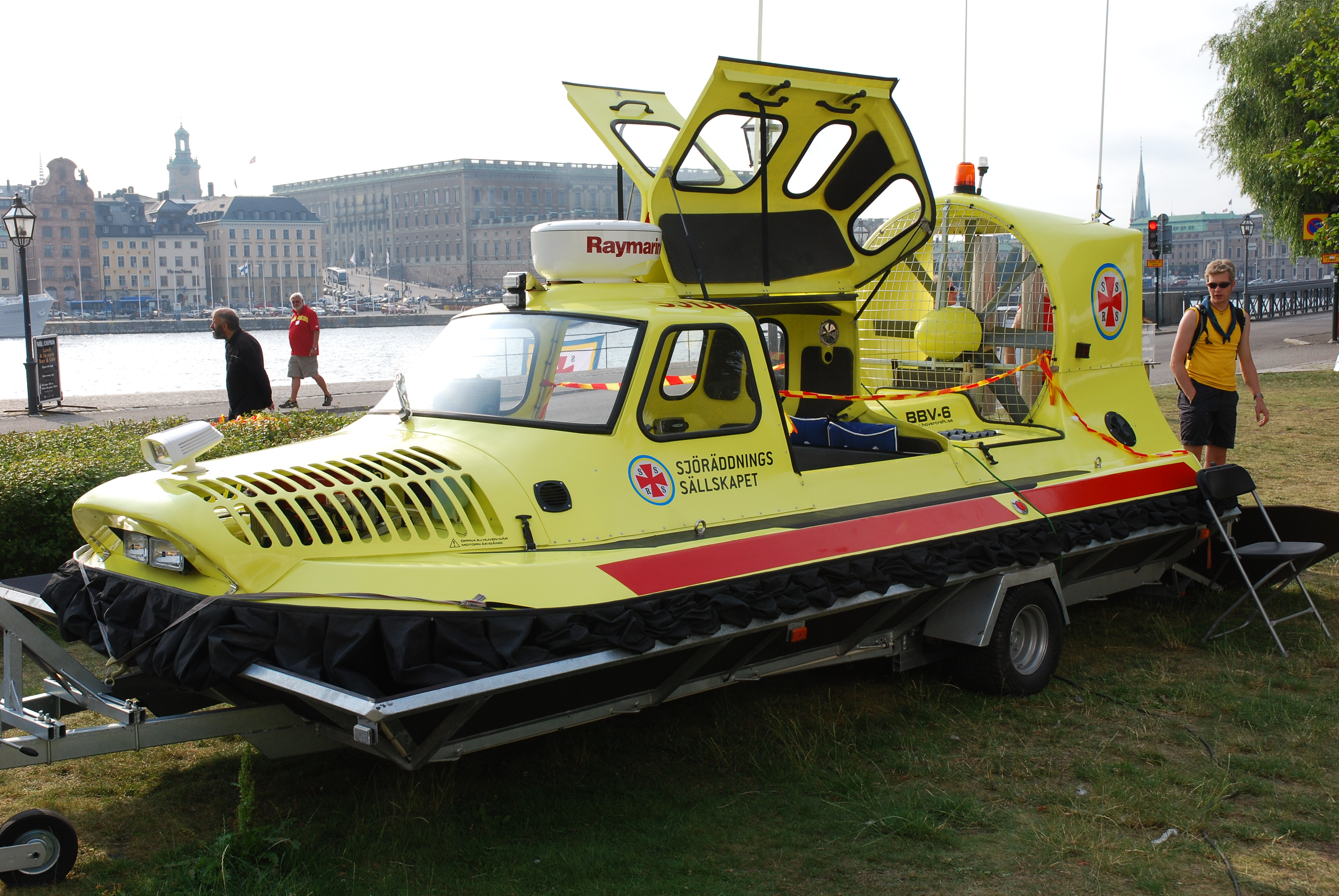
A covered hovercraft used by the Sea Rescue Society

- 3 fast 20 metre rescue cruisers of the Rausing class
- 1 fast 15 metre rescue cruiser of the Hallberg Rassy class
- 1 fast 14 metre rescue cruiser of the Sanne class
- 36 fast 12 metre rescue cruisers of the Victoria class
- 9 fast 11 metre rescue vessels of the PostCode lottery class
- 49 fast 8 metre open rescue vessels of the Gunnel Larsson class
- 5 fast rescue vessel of the Escort class
- 48 Rescue runners. (Jetski modified for rescue operations)
- 13 large, covered hovercraft
- 4 small, open hovercraft
- Close to 50 ribs and MOB boats
- 26 environment salvage trailers.

The Society previous had 3 Finnish-Swedish ice class cruisers, MV Astra, Rescue Dan Borström and Rescue Erik Collin. However, the vessels were discontinued in 2017/2018 and sold to private ownership. In 2020 the Astra was purchased by the Witherby Publishing Group. The ship undertook conversion work in 2021 to provide research opportunities for Witherbys, including the completion of a 22,000 nautical mile circumnavigation of the world in 2022.

== Similar organisations of other nations ==
- Royal National Lifeboat Institution – British Isles equivalent
- Royal Canadian Marine Search and Rescue – Canadian West Coast equivalent
- Royal Netherlands Sea Rescue Institution – Dutch equivalent
- Société Nationale de Sauvetage en Mer – French equivalent
- German Maritime Search and Rescue Service – German equivalent
- Norwegian Society for Sea Rescue – Norwegian equivalent
- National Sea Rescue Institute – South African equivalent
