= National Sea Rescue Institute =

Voluntary non profit organisation in South Africa

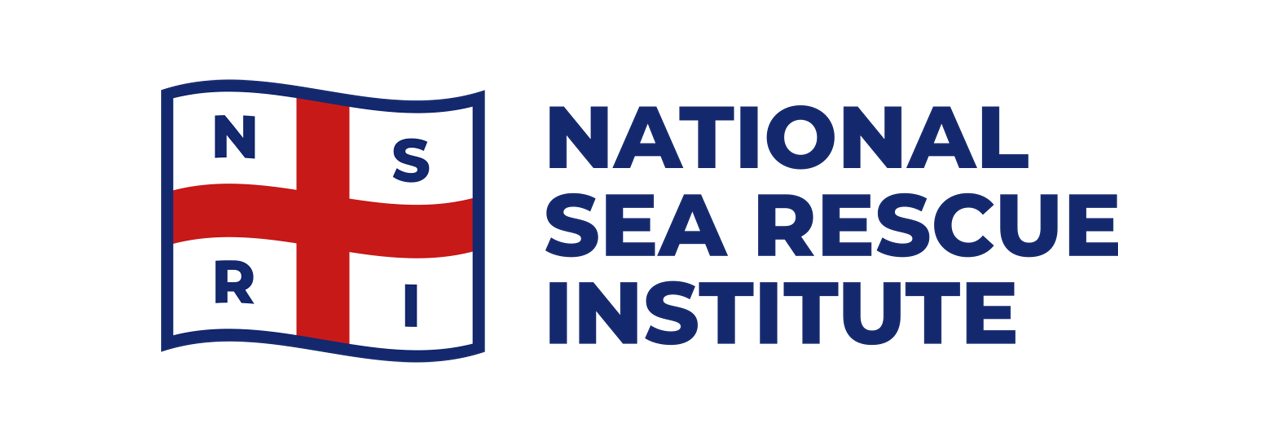

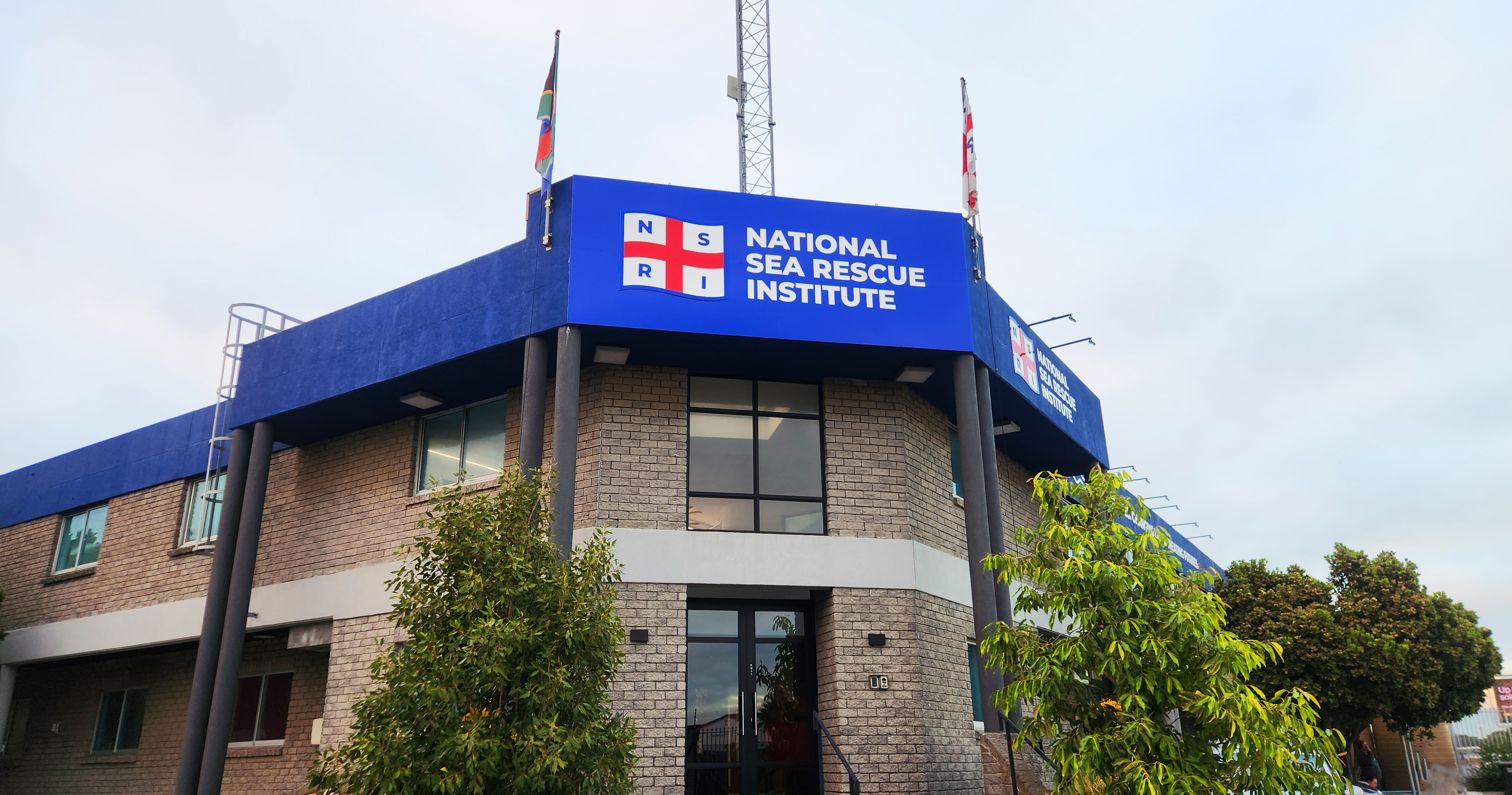
- NSRI Volunteer Support Centre in Milnerton, Cape Town
- Abbreviation: NSRI
- Formation: 1967; 59 years ago
- Type: Non-profit organisation
- Purpose: Search and rescue
- Headquarters: Milnerton, Cape Town
- Location: South Africa
- Region served: South Africa
- CEO: Michael Vonk
- Staff: 1 500 unpaid volunteers; 100+ head office staff; 125 paid lifeguards (during summer)
- Website: https://www.nsri.org.za/

The National Sea Rescue Institute (NSRI) is a voluntary non-profit organisation in South Africa tasked with saving lives through drowning prevention. It operates over 50 bases (as of May 2025) comprising coastal stations, inland stations on dams, auxiliary stations and lifeguard units. The organisation maintains crews on standby around the clock, with more than 1,500 volunteers supported by an operations department at its head office in Cape Town. These volunteers are equipped with sponsored rescue craft, rescue vehicles, quad bikes, and tractors. In addition, paid lifeguards are deployed on selected beaches across the country.

The NSRI works closely with other Search and Rescue organisations (22 Squadron SAAF, South African Police Service and South African Maritime Safety Authority) in South Africa.

== History ==
Following an incident at Stilbaai near Mossel Bay on the south coast of South Africa in 1966, in which 17 fishermen drowned after three fishing boats sank in a storm, Miss Pattie Price of Simon’s Town whose own life had been saved by a RNLI lifeboat in the English Channel, wrote a series of letters to the newspapers to advocate for the formation of a sea rescue organisation in South Africa.

Captain Bob Deacon and Ray Lant were the first volunteers to respond to this call and in 1967 the South African Inshore Rescue Service (SAISRS) was started, with a 4.7m inflatable boat donated by the Society of Master Mariners. The SAISRS was later renamed to National Sea Rescue Institute (NSRI) and continues the tradition of operation by volunteers.

== Development and Expansion ==
Beyond rescue operations, the NSRI places significant emphasis on drowning prevention. In 2006, it launched a Water Safety Education Programme aimed at teaching children about water safety. This initiative has grown to include over 20 full-time instructors who also teach survival swimming skills. In 2014, the NSRI established a dedicated Drowning Prevention Department, now referred to as Community Programmes, which has since introduced innovative projects such as pink rescue buoys, survival swimming centres, beach safety cameras, and a research and advocacy stream.

== Bases ==
The NSRI operates a network of over 50 strategically located stations across South Africa, positioned to provide rapid response to emergencies in both coastal and inland waters. These stations are distributed along the Atlantic and Indian Ocean coastlines—from major urban centres like Cape Town, Durban, and Gqeberha, to smaller communities such as Kommetjie, Still Bay, and Port Nolloth. Inland stations, such as those at Hartbeespoort Dam and Vaal Dam, support rescue efforts in freshwater environments. Each station is staffed primarily by trained volunteers who are on standby 24 hours a day. During peak holiday seasons, selected stations are also supported by salaried lifeguards stationed on popular beaches. Stations are numbered and named based on their location, with some—like Simon’s Town—named in honour of key contributors to the NSRI’s history.

The network is coordinated from the NSRI's Volunteer Support Centre in Cape Town and supported by a national operations centre, ensuring effective communication and deployment across regions. These stations not only perform search and rescue missions but also serve as hubs for drowning prevention initiatives and community engagement.

== Rescue craft ==
The rescue craft operated by the NSRI form the backbone of its maritime emergency response capabilities. Designed for rapid deployment in various sea and inland water conditions, these vessels are crewed primarily by trained volunteers and are stationed at NSRI bases across the country. The fleet includes a range of purpose-built boats and support vehicles tailored to the diverse marine and freshwater environments in which the NSRI operates.

=== Types of Rescue Craft ===
The NSRI maintains a diverse fleet, broadly categorised into several types based on size, range, and mission profile:

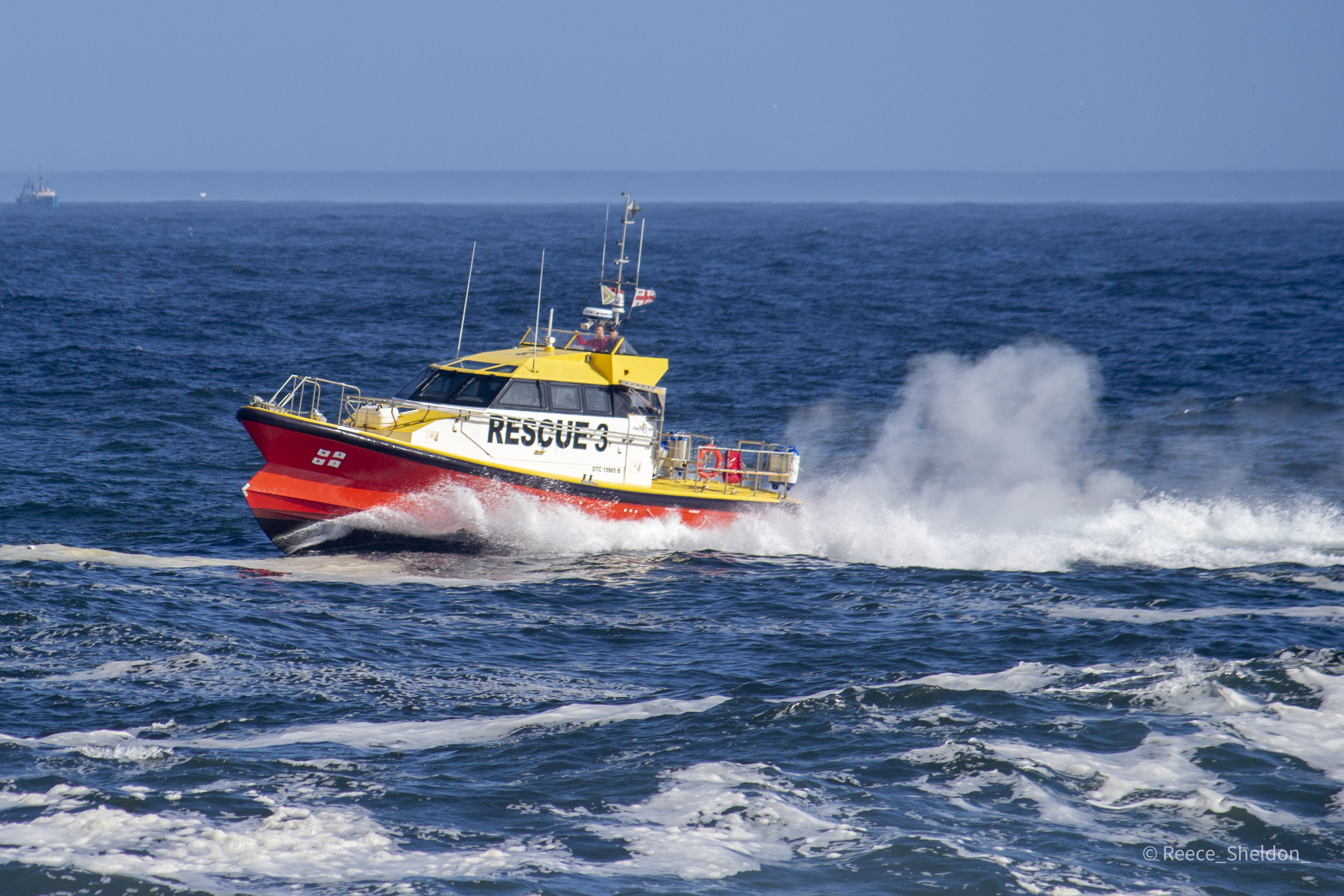
Table Bay station's Rescue 3, one of the NSRI's Class 1 offshore rescue crafts.

- Class 1 Offshore Rescue Boats: Large, all-weather vessels designed for extended missions and offshore rescues. These boats are capable of operating in rough sea conditions and are equipped with advanced navigation and communication systems. They are typically based at high-traffic coastal stations such as Cape Town, Durban, and Gqeberha.
- Class 2 Inshore Rescue Boats: Medium-sized rigid inflatable boats (RIBs) suited for coastal operations closer to shore. They are fast, highly maneuverable, and ideal for responding to incidents in surf zones, harbours, and estuaries.
- Class 3 and 4 Rescue RIBs: Smaller, lightweight boats used for rapid response in protected waters, rivers, and dams. These craft are often deployed at inland stations or in support of larger boats during nearshore operations.
- JetRIBs and Rescue Runners: Compact, jet-powered vessels designed for quick access in shallow waters and surf zones. Often used in conjunction with beach patrols and lifeguard units, they allow crews to reach casualties in areas inaccessible to larger boats.
- Support Craft and Vehicles: In addition to boats, the NSRI uses quad bikes, 4x4 vehicles, and launch tractors to transport boats across beaches and rugged terrain, particularly where slipways are unavailable.

=== Equipment and Safety Features ===
All NSRI rescue boats are equipped with:

- VHF marine radios
- GPS and radar systems (on larger boats)
- First aid kits and resuscitation equipment
- Stretchers and towlines
- Flares and safety gear

=== Local Design and Sponsorship ===
Many of the NSRI's boats are locally designed and built in South Africa, reflecting the organisation’s commitment to supporting local maritime engineering. The acquisition and upkeep of rescue craft are largely funded through public donations, corporate sponsorships, and bequests. Each vessel is typically named in recognition of a donor, individual, or organisation that contributed to its funding.

== Survival Swimming Centres ==
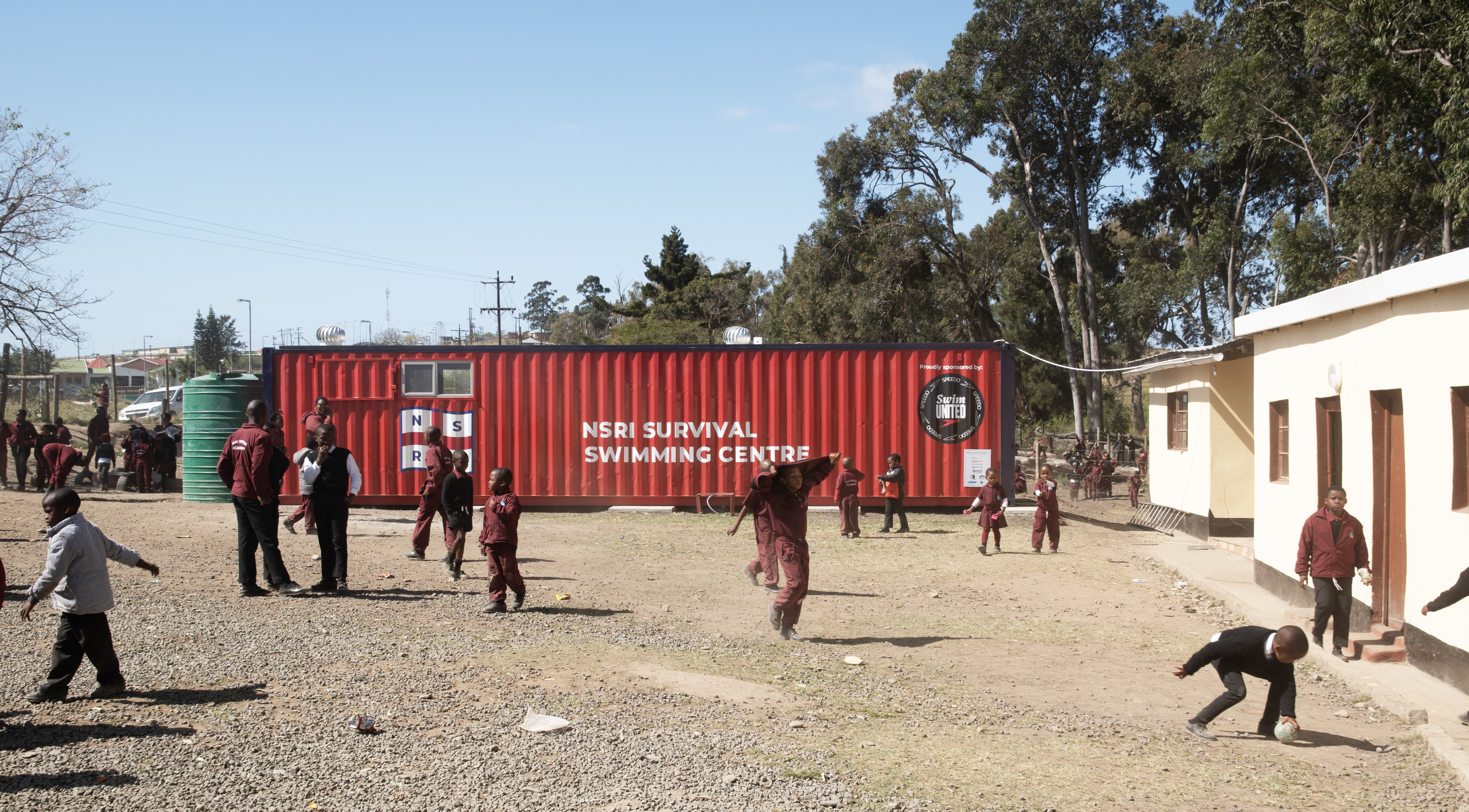
One of the NSRI's Survival Swimming Centres located in Tombo in the KwaZulu-Natal province.

The Survival Swimming Centres are part of the NSRI's nationwide effort to reduce drownings in South Africa, particularly among children and communities with limited access to formal swimming education. These centres aim to equip individuals with basic water survival skills, focusing on safety, confidence in the water, and life-saving techniques rather than advanced swimming proficiency.

Survival Swimming Centres are situated in areas where access to swimming lessons is limited. Centres are often placed near schools, public facilities, or in under-resourced communities, particularly in rural or peri-urban areas. The pools are usually converted shipping containers or modular units, designed to be easily transportable, quick to install, and affordable to operate. Each centre is staffed by trained instructors and volunteers, with support from NSRI’s Drowning Prevention team. Lessons are short, practical, and tailored to local needs, often conducted in partnership with schools or community groups.

The programme targets children aged 6 and up, but is open to people of all ages. By focusing on survival rather than recreational swimming, the initiative addresses a critical public health need in a country where thousands of people drown each year. The NSRI works with the Department of Basic Education, local government, and other NGOs to ensure widespread access and long-term sustainability.

Since its inception, the Survival Swimming programme has reached tens of thousands of learners, and the NSRI continues to expand its network of centres with the goal of making survival swimming education a standard offering in all high-risk communities.

== Pink Rescue Buoy Initiative ==
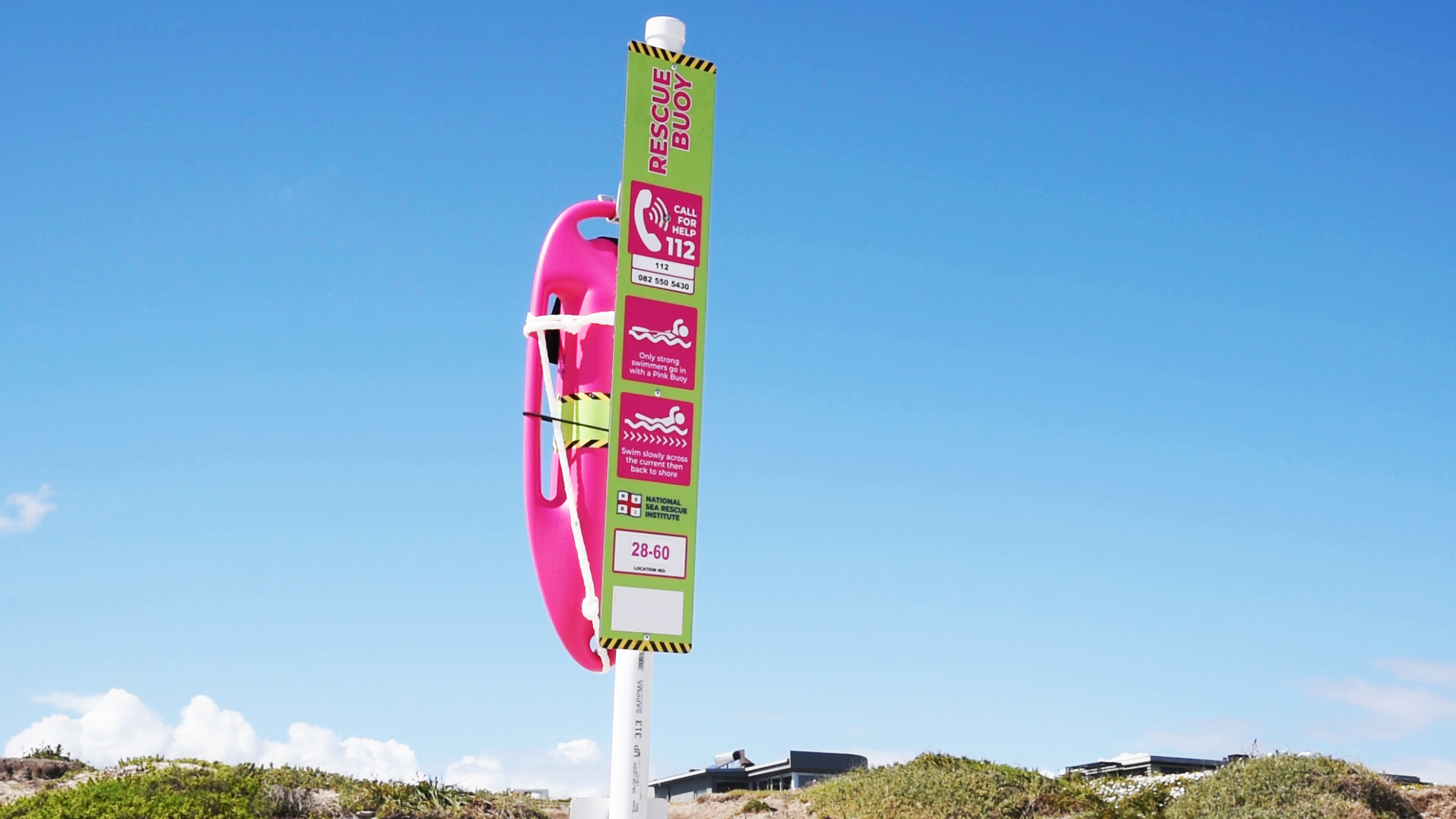
A pink rescue buoy, one of thousands near and around South Africa's waters placed by the NSRI, in Blouberstrand, Cape Town

The NSRI’s Pink Rescue Buoy initiative, launched in 2017, is an internationally acclaimed drowning prevention programme that places distinctive pink flotation devices at high-risk beaches, rivers, dams, and other water bodies across South Africa. The easily recognisable colour and clear signage make them highly visible in emergencies, allowing untrained bystanders to attempt safer rescues without putting themselves at unnecessary risk.

Since its inception, the initiative has helped save over 200 lives, often thanks to the quick actions of members of the public. There are now more than 1,400 buoys deployed along beaches, rivers and dams in South Africa, each maintained by NSRI volunteers who regularly check and replace missing or damaged units. The programme has attracted international attention, with similar initiatives now being trialled or adopted in countries such as New Zealand. It has also earned global recognition, including the International Maritime Rescue Federation’s Award for Innovation and Technology in 2018. As part of the NSRI’s broader mission to prevent drowning, the Pink Rescue Buoy programme is supported by educational outreach and community engagement, reinforcing the importance of water safety across South Africa.

Pink Rescue Buoys can be purchased from the NSRI and placed at a location of the buyer's choice for R2000 (~$100).

== See also ==
Similar organisations around the world:

- Royal Netherlands Sea Rescue Institution
- Royal National Lifeboat Institution (Ireland and the United Kingdom)
- Société Nationale de Sauvetage en Mer (France)
- German Maritime Search and Rescue Service (Germany)
- Norsk Selskab til Skibbrudnes Redning (Norway, also called Redningsselskapet)
