= Rescue of the Renown =

Renown
History

German Empire
- Name: SV Renown
- Builder: R. & H. Green, Blackwall Yard
- Launched: 1842
- Acquired: 1882
- Fate: Foundered December 1887

General characteristics
- Tons burthen: 1224
- Propulsion: Sail
- Sail plan: Barque

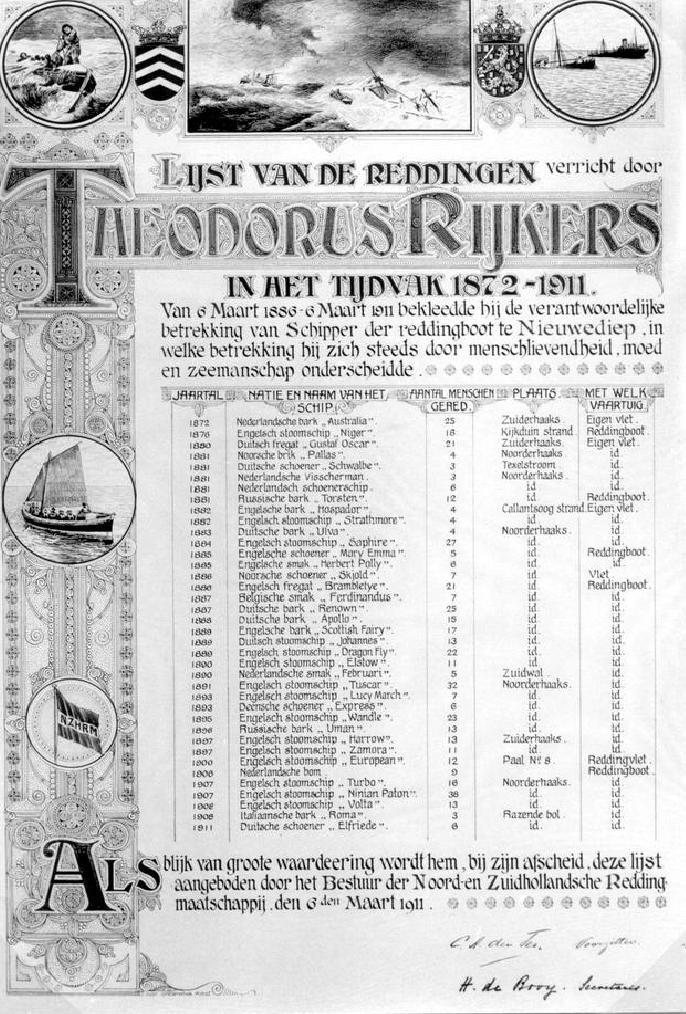
A 1911 list showing Dorus Rijkers's most important rescues between 1872 and 1911 (showing the Renown rescue under 1887). Note that his full name, Theodorus, is used here.

Renown was a barque used as a sailing cargo ship built in 1842 by R. & H. Green in Blackwall, London. She survived a cyclone at Calcutta in 1864, and was sold to German owners in 1882. In 1887 or 1888 she foundered off Den Helder on the Dutch coast.

== The storm and sinking ==
In December 1887, the Renown sank during a storm in the North Sea off Den Helder in the Netherlands. The survivors climbed up the mizzen-mast and were eventually rescued by a small lifeboat that approached the sinking ship. The lifeboat, captained by Dorus Rijkers, approached Renown, and Rijkers jumped out of the boat and climbed the mast. He and his crew helped the endangered men from the mast to the lifeboat, and brought them to dry land. Of the ship's total crew of 30, approximately five died in the shipwreck and the remainder were rescued between 9 and 11 December.

== Aftermath ==
The heroic rescue ended successfully, and Dorus Rijkers was later awarded with a gold medal for valour. All of the surviving crew members received a small stipend from the court of The Hague after it was decided that they earned it because Renown was in bad condition when she left the harbour at Hamburg, Germany, one week before the accident.

== See also ==
- Royal Netherlands Sea Rescue Institution
