= Norwegian Society for Sea Rescue =

Norwegian sea rescue organization

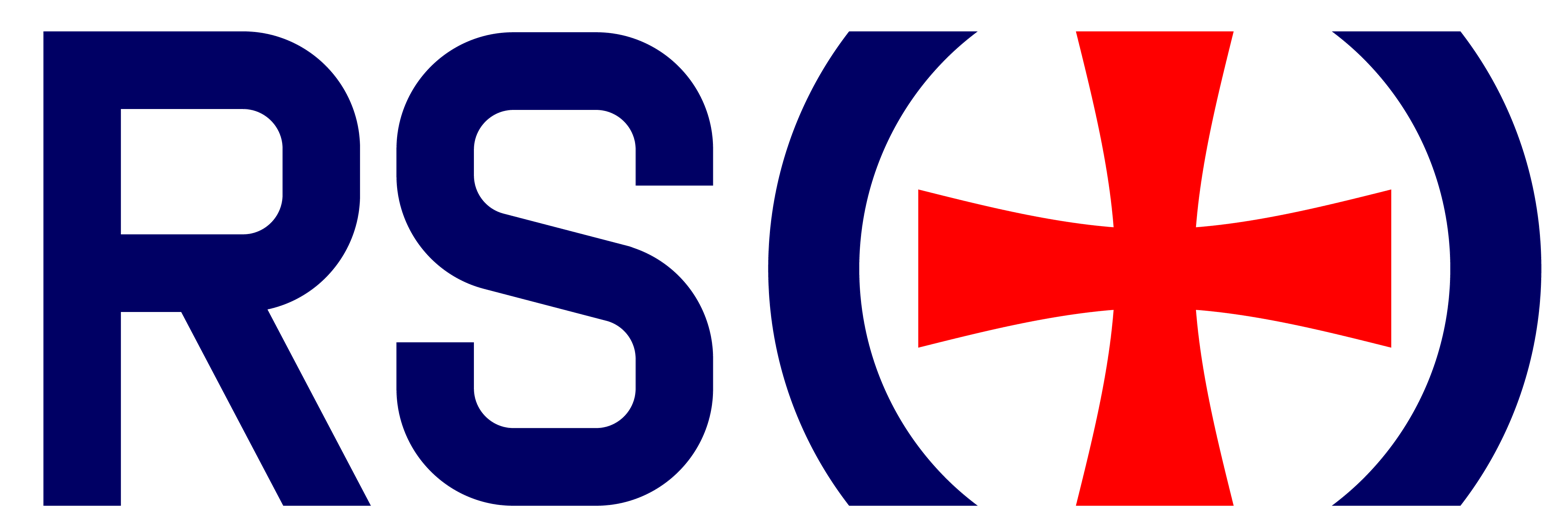
- Founded: 9 July 1891
- Founder: Oscar Tybring
- Location: Norway
- Members: 111,342
- Employees: 197 at sea and 83 on land
- Volunteers: 4,200
- Website: Redningsselskapet

The Norwegian Society for Sea Rescue (Redningsselskapet in Norwegian, commonly shortened to RS) is the only organization wholly dedicated to assisting people and vessels at sea along the extensive Norwegian coastline.

== Overview ==
Norwegian Society for Sea Rescue is a charity organization funded partly by membership fees, partly by donations, and partly by government subsidies. It employs 197 professional seamen, 60 at the head office in Oslo, and 14 in the regional branches. The organization has 4,200 volunteers, and around 111,000 paying members. Pleasure craft owners can sign up for a "totalmedlemsskap" (Total Membership), a service and assistance package deal.

The organization's vision is "None Shall Drown".

The organization publishes the quarterly magazine RS-Magasinet.

=== Vessels ===
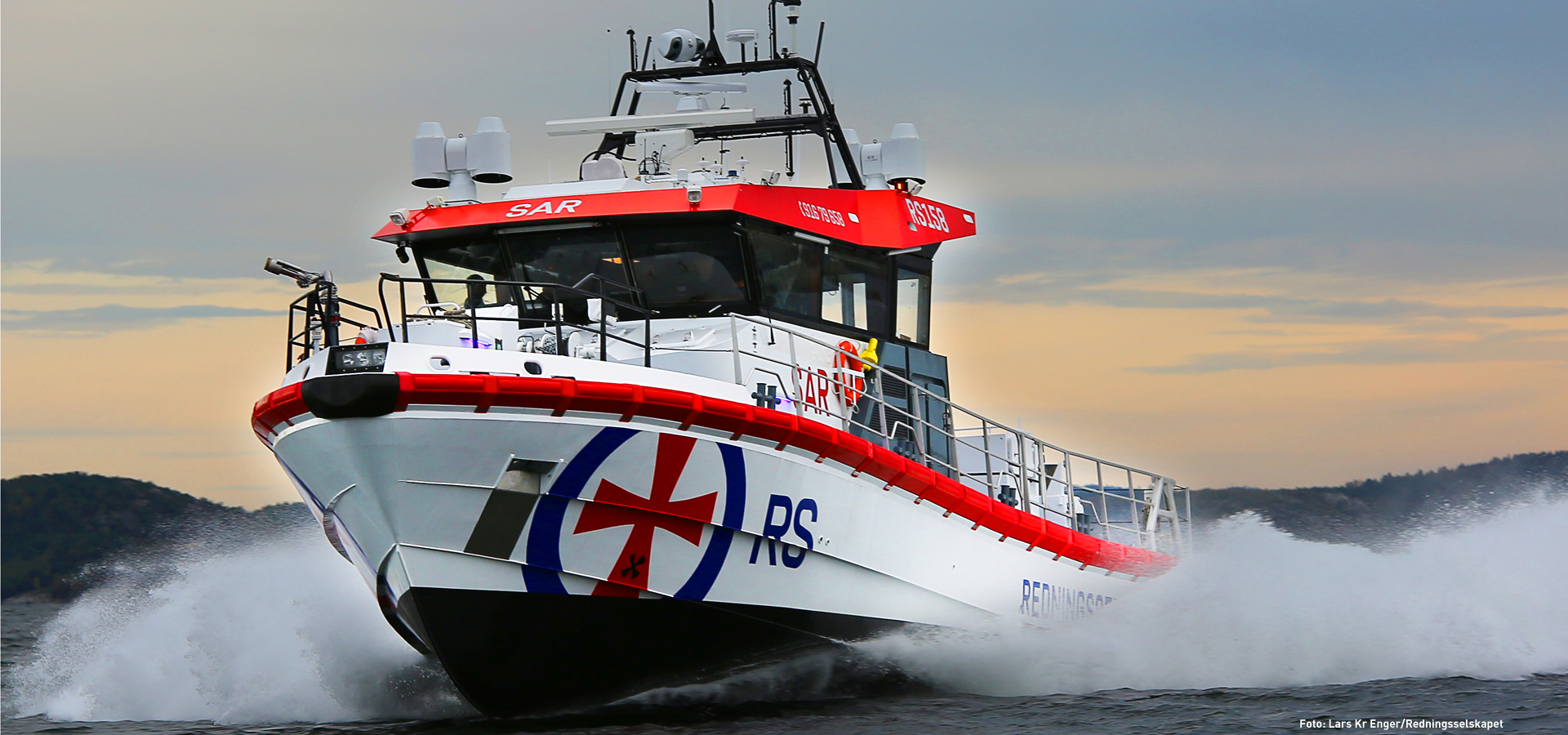
RS 158 "Idar Ulstein" operated by professional seamen

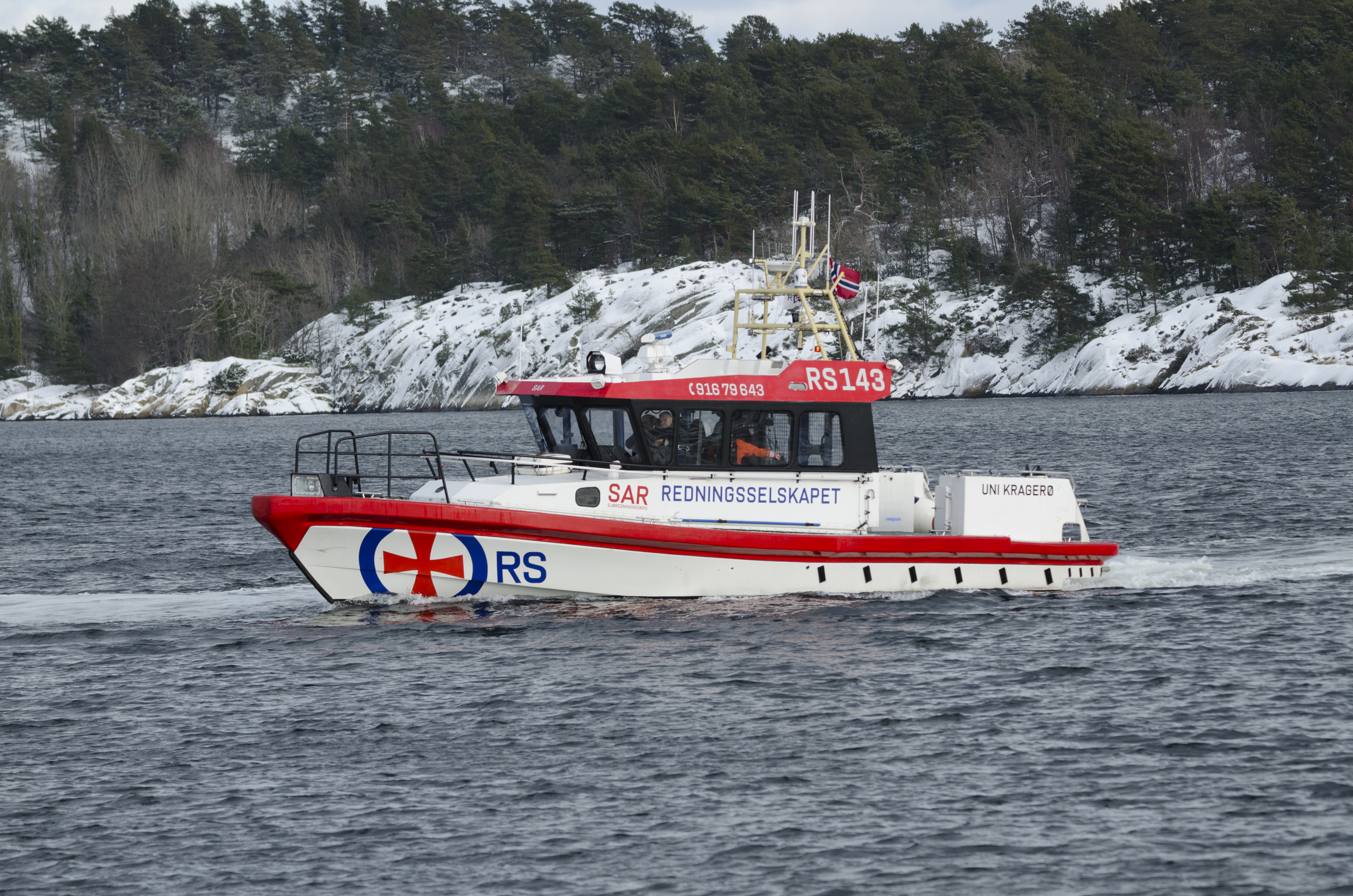
RS 143 "Uni Kragerø" operated by volunteer crew

The organization operates 51 vessels stationed along the Norwegian coastline, as well as one each stationed on the lakes of Femunden and Mjøsa. 26 of the rescue craft along the coast are larger, permanently crewed, sea-going, aluminium-hulled craft called redningsskøyte (Rescue Cruisers). The other are smaller craft crewed by voluntary sjøredningskorps (Rescue Corps).

There were 7,869 launches in 2017, assisting 21,190 persons, including saving 35 lives and 111 vessels.

The organization also operates four ambulance vessels on the coast of Helgeland and Nordland.

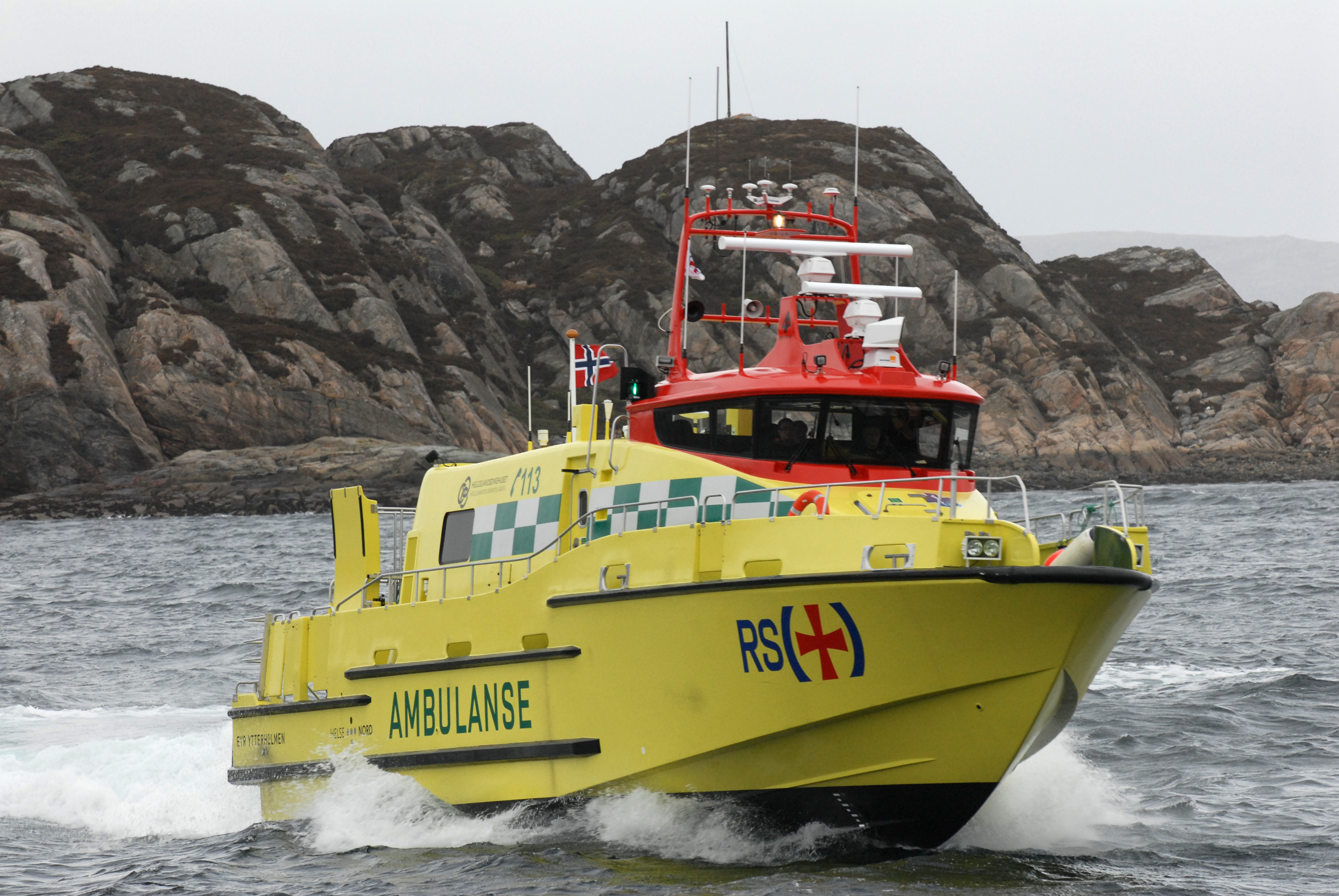
Ambulance vessel "Eyr Ytterholmen"

=== Official mascot ===
The society's official mascot is Elias the Little Rescue Boat, who is the main character of an animated series on national television, books and merchandise. Elias is used by local chapters of the society to teach children about safety at sea. The TV series were nominated for best children's TV series in the Emmy Awards.

== History ==
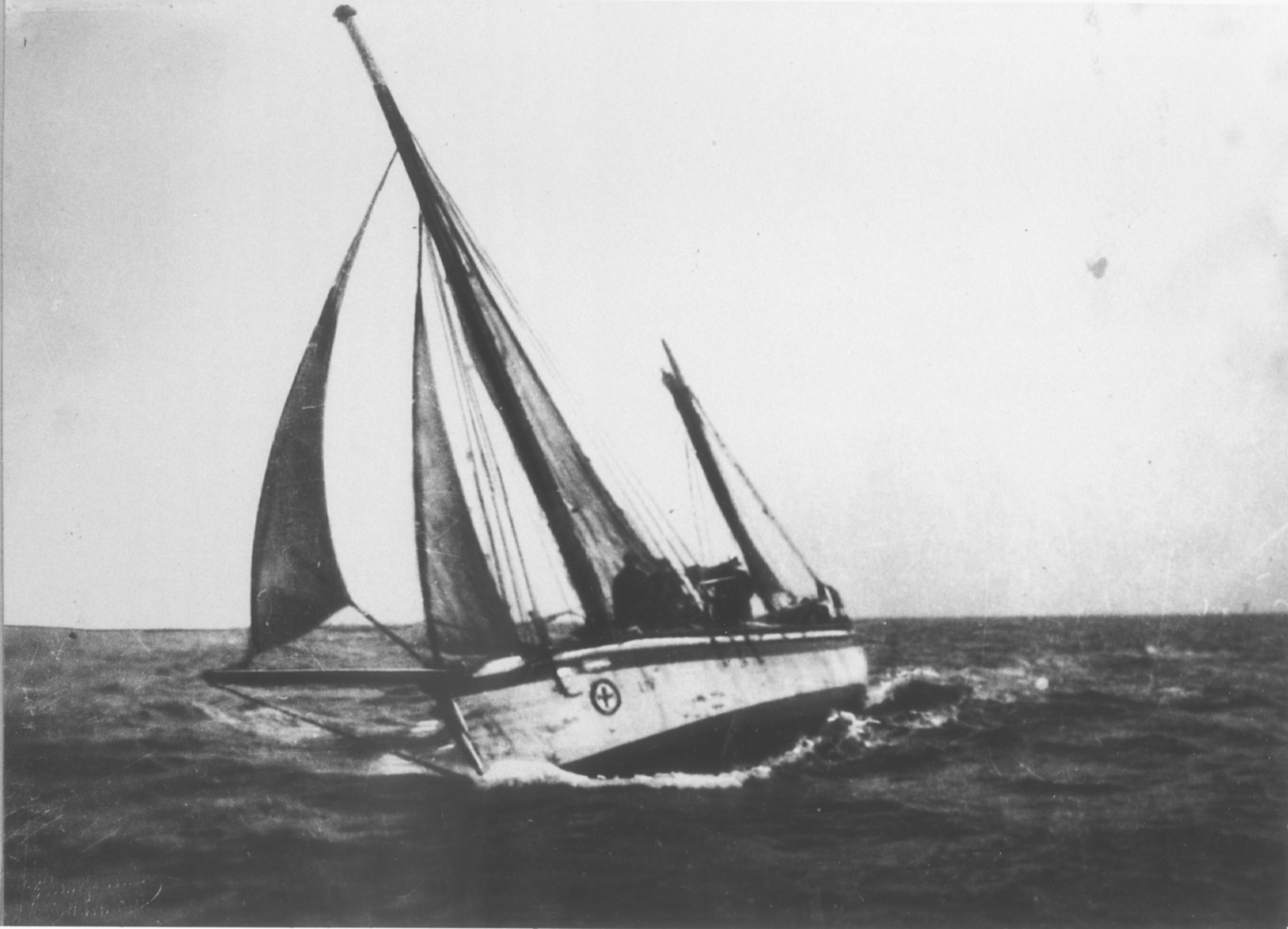
RS 5 "Liv", first boat purpose-built for the organization

Inspired by the British RNLI, the Norwegian Society for Sea Rescue was founded by the Kristiania Kjøbmannsforening (Kristiania Merchant's Association) in Kristiania (now Oslo) 9 July 1891, with the goal of increasing safety at sea by rescuing lives and property. The first rescue boat went into service in 1893.

All vessels names carry the prefix "RS" (for "Redningsskøyte") and a number. Until 1893 the organization used pilot craft designed by Colin Archer. The first boat purpose-built for the organization was RS 5 Liv, which was the result of a design competition won by Christian Stephansen. After some design changes by Colin Archer, the craft was built in 1893–1894. She served until 1934, rescuing 132 lives, saved 41 ships and assisted 1338 others.

The first ship class commissioned by the Norwegian Society for Sea Rescue was the Colin Archer class, designed by Colin Archer but drawing heavily on experience from the work with "Liv". The first ship of the class, 'RS 1 Colin Archer was launched in 1894. It served until 1933, rescued 274 lives and 67 ships, and assisted 1522 ships.

The extremely rugged Colin Archer class sailing vessels became iconic in Norway, and to this day several of the class are used as private pleasure craft, or preserved in museums. The class is still popular today, and vessels are still built based on Archer's drawings.

An updated and motorized design by Bjarne Aas was launched in 1932, with RS 38 Biskop Hvoslef being the first in class.

== See also ==
- German Maritime Search and Rescue Service – German equivalent
- Lebanese Sea Rescue Unit – Lebanese equivalent
- National Sea Rescue Institute – South African equivalent
- Royal Canadian Marine Search and Rescue – West Coast Canadian equivalent
- Royal National Lifeboat Institution – British equivalent
- Royal Netherlands Sea Rescue Institution – Dutch equivalent
- Société Nationale de Sauvetage en Mer – French equivalent
- Swedish Sea Rescue Society – Swedish equivalent
- Whitfords Volunteer Sea Rescue Group – One of the 3 last independent charitable lifeboat stations left in Western Australia after the others came under the government FESA umbrella (some coerced, some voluntarily), the group and the other two still face government pressure to be nationalised)
- New South Wales Marine Rescue - NSW Australia
