= Whitfords Volunteer Sea Rescue Group =

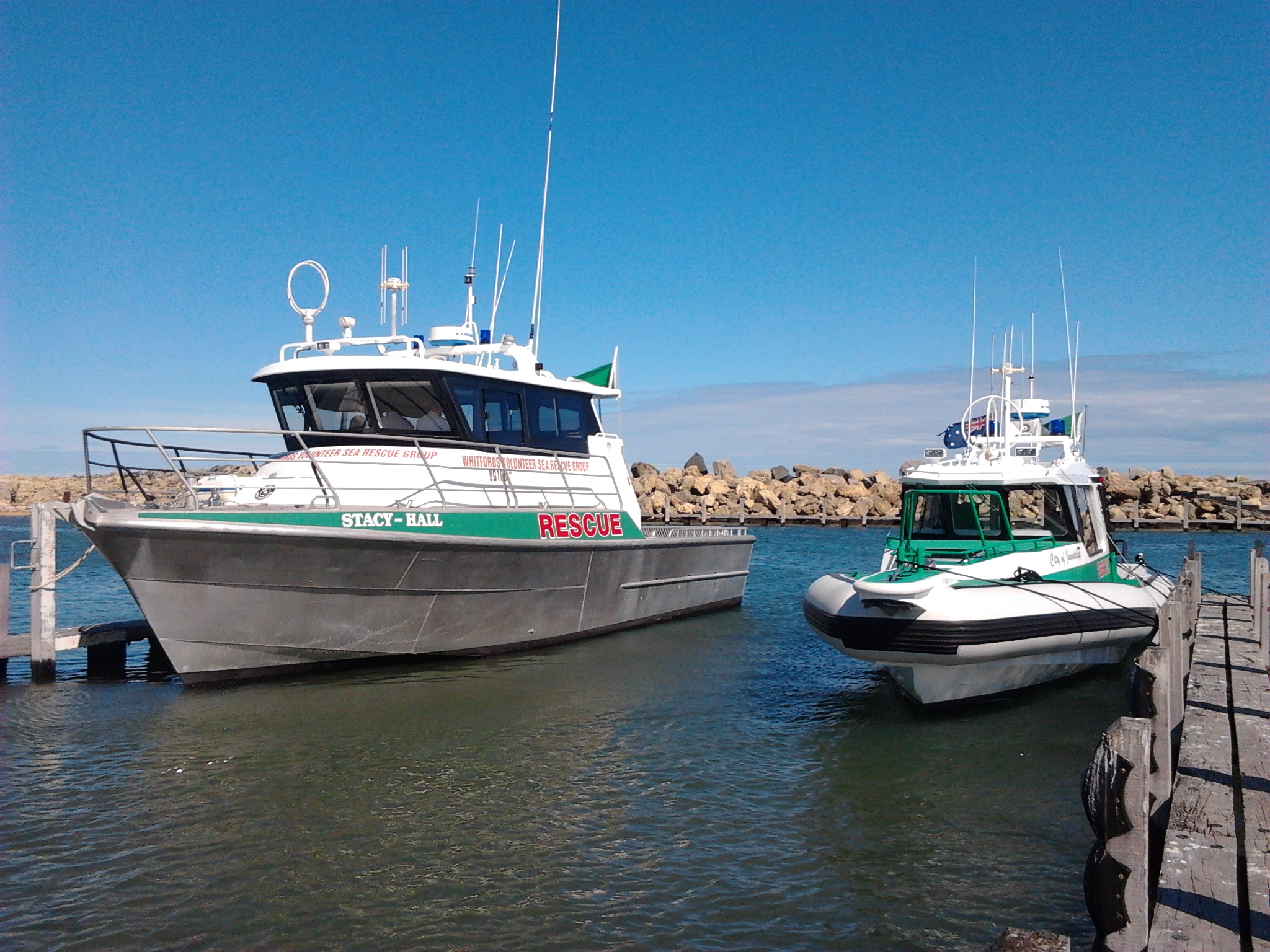
WVSRG Boats in Ocean Reef boat launch, August 2011. "Green 1 - Stacy Hall" (left), "Green 2 - City of Joondalup" (right)

Whitford's Volunteer Sea Rescue Group is a not for profit group based in Perth, Western Australia that provides emergency assistance, safety training, and search and rescue services for water users. It is similar in role to the different Auxiliary Coastguard and Coastwatch organisations in Australia.

== Overview ==
The group is based in the Northern suburbs of Perth, Western Australia. Together with sister group Cockburn (in the South) the two independent groups are part of an alliance to provide sea rescue services to Western Australian police.

These 2 groups are independent charities (like the RNLI in the UK) as opposed to most other Sea Rescue groups in Western Australia (WA) which are part of Department of Fire and Emergency Services.

WVSRG is a registered charity and Public Benevolent Institution with "Not for Profit" and "deductible gift recipient" status. Money donated is used to improve services and equipment, the group states they have no paid personnel and that they are not a part of any government department but rather an independent group of volunteers. The group accepts donations and sponsorships from private industry as well as some grants from local government. In addition they raise money through occasional fundraising events and providing boating courses to the general public such as the WA "Recreational Skippers Ticket" or "Marine Radio".

== Services provided ==
WVSRG provides :

- A round the clock radio monitoring service on VHF, HF, 27MHz bands.
- Boat log in / log out reporting, boats can voluntarily register when they go out to sea and if they are reported overdue WVSRG will raise the alarm and if required start to search. - CALLSIGN "VJ6LQ".
- 2 large "Lifeboats" for Search and Rescue operations
- Training to the public on boating courses
- Safety awareness campaigns to improve boating safety
- Radio and rescue boat support to local events e.g. annual Rottnest Channel Swim, the Metropolitan Sea Rescue's Rottnest Safety Convoy and the annual Dragon Boat Races in Hillarys Boat Harbour.
- First Aid - first responder service if called upon at sea or in marinas in its patrol area.

== Boats ==
The rescue group currently has three rescue boats:

- Callsign "Green1" - Named "Stacy Hall" - A large ~12m launch with 2x450HP diesels, capable of operating far out to sea.
- Callsign "Green2" - Named "City of Joondalup" - A large 11.5m Naiad Rigid Inflatable Boat (RIB) with twin 350HP 4 stroke Yamaha outboards.
- Callsign "Green3" - Name TBC - A 6.5m Naiad with twin 4 stroke Yamaha 115HP engines. She is mounted on a trailer with rapid launch features. This boat will be used to add capacity to searches, for inshore and shallow water work, for use with smaller vessels or swimmers/divers, training, event support, to support SLS, or even conceptually moved rapidly by land to aid in other searches. She used to belong to Margaret River VMR who sold her to WVSR.

Both larger boats in the current fleet are capable of operating in rough weather and far out to sea. Green1 is capable of 30 knots, and Green2 is capable of over 45 knots. Both boats are extensively equipped with SAR, First aid and towing equipment - e.g. both boats have radar, multiple slaved consoles with GPS/Radar/sounder, Radio Direction finders for VHF and 27Mhz, extensive radios, Forward Looking Infra Red camera for night searches, Defibrillators (AED), and back board. Both boats are crewed by volunteers on weekends and public holidays, then during nights and weekends crews remain on call-out alert in shifts if required.

Green 3 is also capable of working offshore in rough weather as a RIB. She is also useful in that for rapid response she only needs a crew of two to operate.

This gives WVSR inshore, fast response inshore/offshore and large/long range offshore capabilities (30NM+). Broadly equivalent to 2-3 RNLI Stations as Green3 is essentially an Inshore lifeboat (similar to an Atlantic21) with Green2 and Green1 all weather boats.

== Radio ==
The WVSRG HQ is located at Ocean Reef boat launch. It is both a meeting hall, training centre and radio tower. The radio tower is staffed every weekend and when not staffed operators monitor the radios remotely from other locations. The tower overlooks ocean reef boat launch and handles safety logging of boat traffic in and out of Mindarie Marina, Ocean Reef and Hilarys. The group has a high radio antennae and can consequently receive marine VHF from a relatively long distance.

== Notable Rescues ==
The group carries out over 300 rescues per annum on average. Some notable callouts include :

- Valentine's Day 2013 - Green 1 rescued a vessel on the rocks at little island (2 nm offshore from Hillarys, WA) at night in high winds. Water Police had grounded out and couldn't get in close enough and were discussing helicoptering the 4 men on board. The local knowledge of the WVSR skipper allowed him to get his boat in and tow the casualty off.
- July 17, 2013 - A 73-year-old yachtsman got into trouble in heavy seas (7m) and high winds (force 11–12). Water Police cutter Cygnet V searched at sea with 2 experienced WVSR skippers on board as crew for local knowledge. WVSR Green1 and Fremantle VSR R100 were also called out and stood by as backup. WVSR also put out shore units which ultimately found the man. / News story from WA Today
- September 25, 2014 - / 2 fishermen saved from water after their boat sunk
- 28 August 2014 - / Recent incident where WVSR rescued several surfers in 5 m waves
- 4 Nov 2014 - / 14-hour-long rescue of a yacht with a broken mast 90nm from base

== See also ==
- Royal National Lifeboat Institution
- Koninklijke Nederlandse Redding Maatschappij
- Société Nationale de Sauvetage en Mer
