= Bregnør Fiskerleje =

Bregnor
- Village
- Location in the Region of Southern Denmark
- Coordinates: 55°29′N 10°36′E
- Country: Denmark
- Region: Southern Denmark
- Municipality: Kerteminde Municipality
- Time zone: UTC+1 (CET)
  - Summer (DST): UTC+2 (CEST)

Bregnør Fiskerleje is a fishing village to the northeast of Odense, and northwest of Kerteminde in Kerteminde Municipality, Funen, Denmark. Bregnor lies 2.3 miles (3.7 km) to the southeast of the entrance passage to Odense Fjord, and contains a small harbour.
