= Dorus Rijkers =

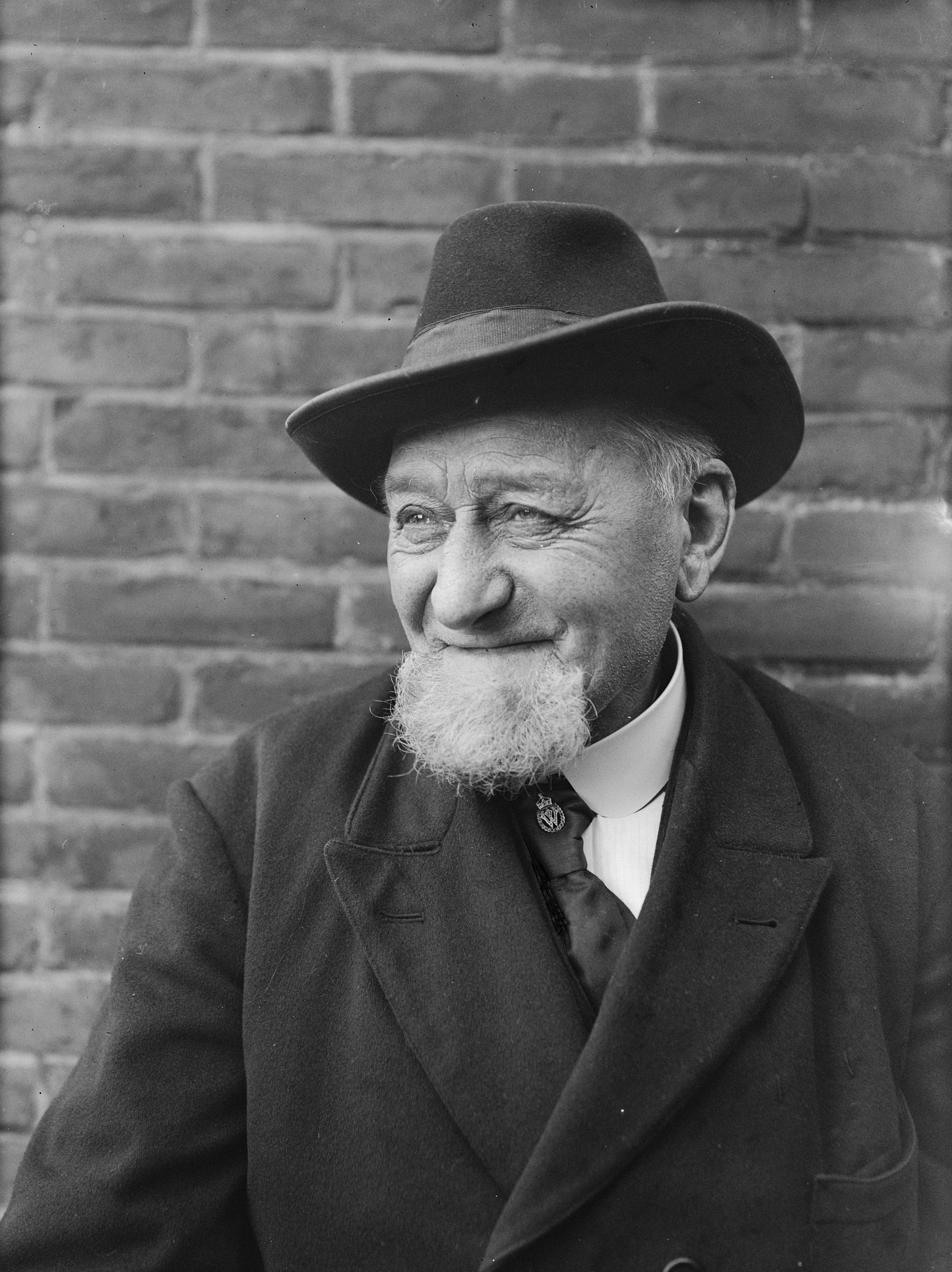
- Born: Theodorus Rijkers; 27 January 1847; Den Helder
- Died: 19 April 1928 (aged 81); Den Helder
- Occupation: Lifeboat coxswain
- Organisation: Noord- en Zuid-Hollandsche Redding Maatschappij (NZHRM)
- Spouse: Neeltje Huisman (widow of Jan Kuiper)
- Children: 7, including 6 adopted
- Website: Foundation "mrb Dorus Rijkers"

Notes
- Dorus Rijkers saved the lives of over 500 people.

Theodorus "Dorus" Rijkers (27 January 1847 – 19 April 1928) was a famous Dutch lifeboat captain and folk hero, most famous for his sea rescues of 487 shipwrecked victims over a total of 38 rescue operations, and at least 25 before joining the lifeboat-service.

== 'Opa' Dorus ==
Dorus received his nickname Grandpa (Dutch: Opa) while still a young man: he had married Neeltje Huisman, a fisherman's widow who already had six children. Shortly after the marriage, the oldest of Neeltje's daughters had a child of her own, and so at only 23 years old Dorus became known as "Opa" in Den Helder where he lived. Although the nickname began as a joke, Dorus soon started acting and looking like a grandpa, and from that time on he became primarily known by his nickname.

== Career as a lifeboat captain ==
Dorus gained most of his fame as a result of his service to the Noord- en Zuid-Hollandsche Redding Maatschappij (NZHRM), one of the two main Dutch lifeboat-societies at the time. The NZHRM would later become the Koninklijke Nederlandse Redding Maatschappij (KNRM).

However his life-saving career began in 1872 before he joined the NZHRM, while acting as captain of his own boat. While at sea, he saved all 25 crew members of the barque Australia from drowning at sea. Because of this incident, Dorus gained a reputation as a rescuer, which preceded his joining the NZHRM as a volunteer. On the basis of his reputation, he was granted the position of coxswain upon joining the NZHRM without having to prove his qualifications. His rank of coxswain entitled him to immediately command his own boat and crew.

Although Dorus joined the NZHRM as a volunteer, he worked so many hours that it precluded him from taking on other paid work. Dorus and all of his crew members received a sum for each trial and each service.

During his nearly 30 years service with the NZHRM, Dorus saved hundreds of people from drowning at sea, becoming legendary long before his retirement. In the waters where he served, he saved such a large number of people with such effectiveness that the survival statistics increased dramatically. At the end of his career, although he remained active, his role became more symbolic in nature.

=== Honored by King William III ===
In 1888, Dorus Rijkers met King William III of the Netherlands after rescuing sailors from the German barque Renown. The King gave Dorus a gold medal of honor and smoked a pipe with him.

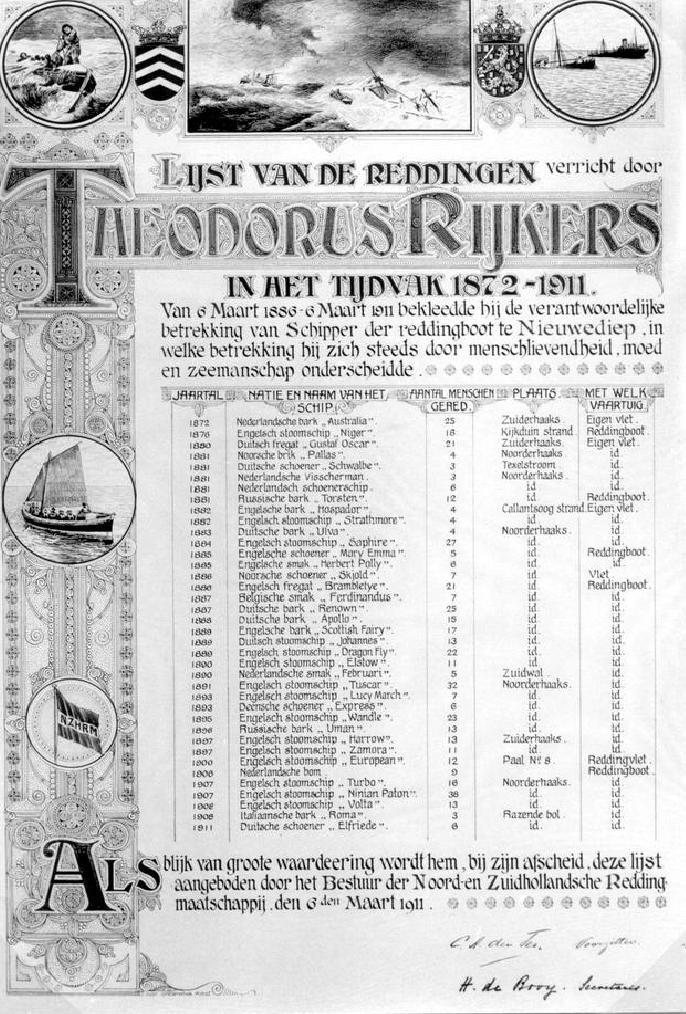
A 1911 list showing Dorus most important between 1872 and 1911 rescues (including the Renown-rescue). Note that his full name, 'Theodorus', is used here.

== Retirement ==
In 1911, Dorus retired at age 64, after which he received only a very small pension. He struggled to make ends meet by eating simple food and living plainly.

During an October 1922 interview with Dr. L.A. Rademaker, editor of the Hague newspaper 'Het Vaderland', Dorus complained about his situation. He claimed that he had been forced to sell the gold medal of honour in order to buy himself a bicycle. The Helden der Zee Fonds 'Dorus Rijkers' (Dorus Rijkers Fund for the Heroes of the Sea) was created after Dorus' plight and that of other retired life-savers were chronicled in 'Het Vaderland'.

== Death ==
In April 1928, Dorus Rijkers died at the age of 81.

== Legacy ==
There is a huge statue erected in honor of all the Netherlands sea-rescuers, opened in 1935 and is sometimes mistakenly assumed to honour Dorus. However, a separate, smaller statue of Dorus was erected in 1939. One of the rescue boats of the KNRM still carries his name with pride.

Dorus is generally acknowledged as one of the greatest rescuers of all time.

=== Streets named after Dorus Rijkers ===
- Dorus Rijkersstraat in Alphen aan den Rijn
- Dorus Rijkersstraat in Amersfoort
- Dorus Rijkershof in Amsterdam
- Dorus Rijkersstraat in Borne
- Dorus Rijkersrede in Capelle aan den IJssel
- Dorus Rijkersplein in The Hague
- Theodorus Rijkersstraat in Den Helder
- Dorus Rijkersstraat in Dinteloord
- Dorus Rijkersstraat in Dordrecht
- Dorus Rijkersplein in Egmond aan Zee
- Dorus Rijkersstraat in Genemuiden
- Dorus Rijkersstraat in Groningen
- Dorus Rijkerskade in Leiden
- Dorus Rijkersweg in Leiden
- Dorus Rijkersstraat in Lisse
- Dorus Rijkerstraat in Middelburg
- Dorus Rijkersstraat in Reeuwijk
- Dorus Rijkersstraat in Terneuzen

== General and cited sources ==
- Bremer, Jan. the chapter: "Dorus Rijkers (1847–1928); Koning der Blauwe zeeridders" in Roeiredders aan het Marsdiep 1824-1923; Nationaal Reddingmuseum Dorus Rijkers and the Helderse Historische Vereniging, Den Helder; November 1998, ISBN 90-6455-294-0. pp. 111–140. This book forms is volume 9 of the series: Helderse Historische Reeks. (Jan T. Bremer is a well-informed, serious author on especially historical/geographical matters about the Noordkop (the region around Den Helder in The Netherlands).
- Adema, Tjeerd. Dorus Rijkers; De Heldersche Menschenredder. Published by Egner in Helder (not: Den Helder) in 1928.
