= Royal Netherlands Sea Rescue Institution =

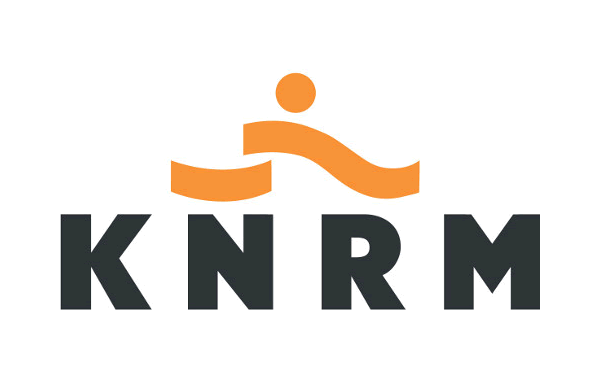
- Abbreviation: KNRM
- Formation: 1 May 1991
- Type: Life savers
- Patron: Princess Beatrix

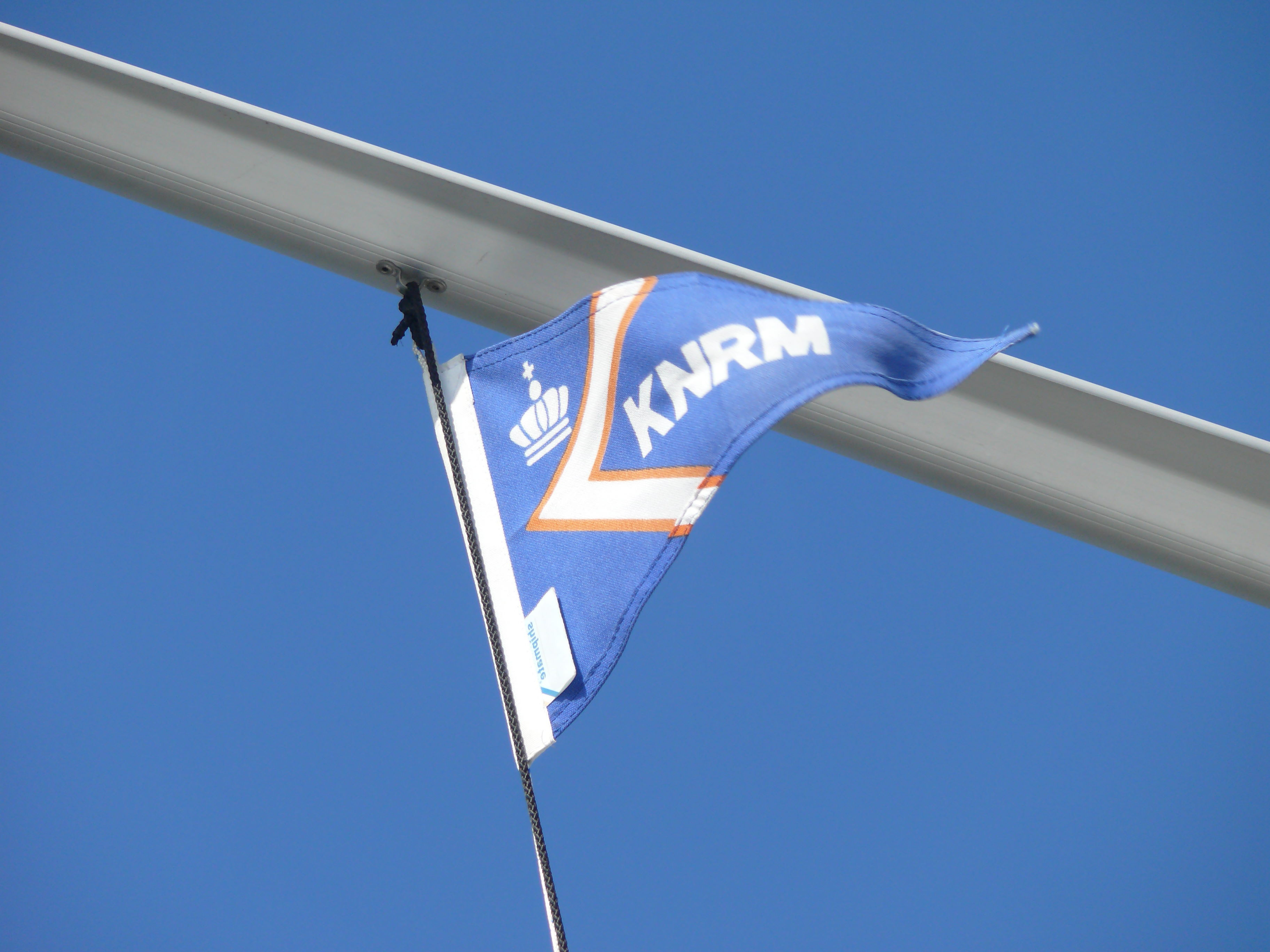
Flag of KNRM

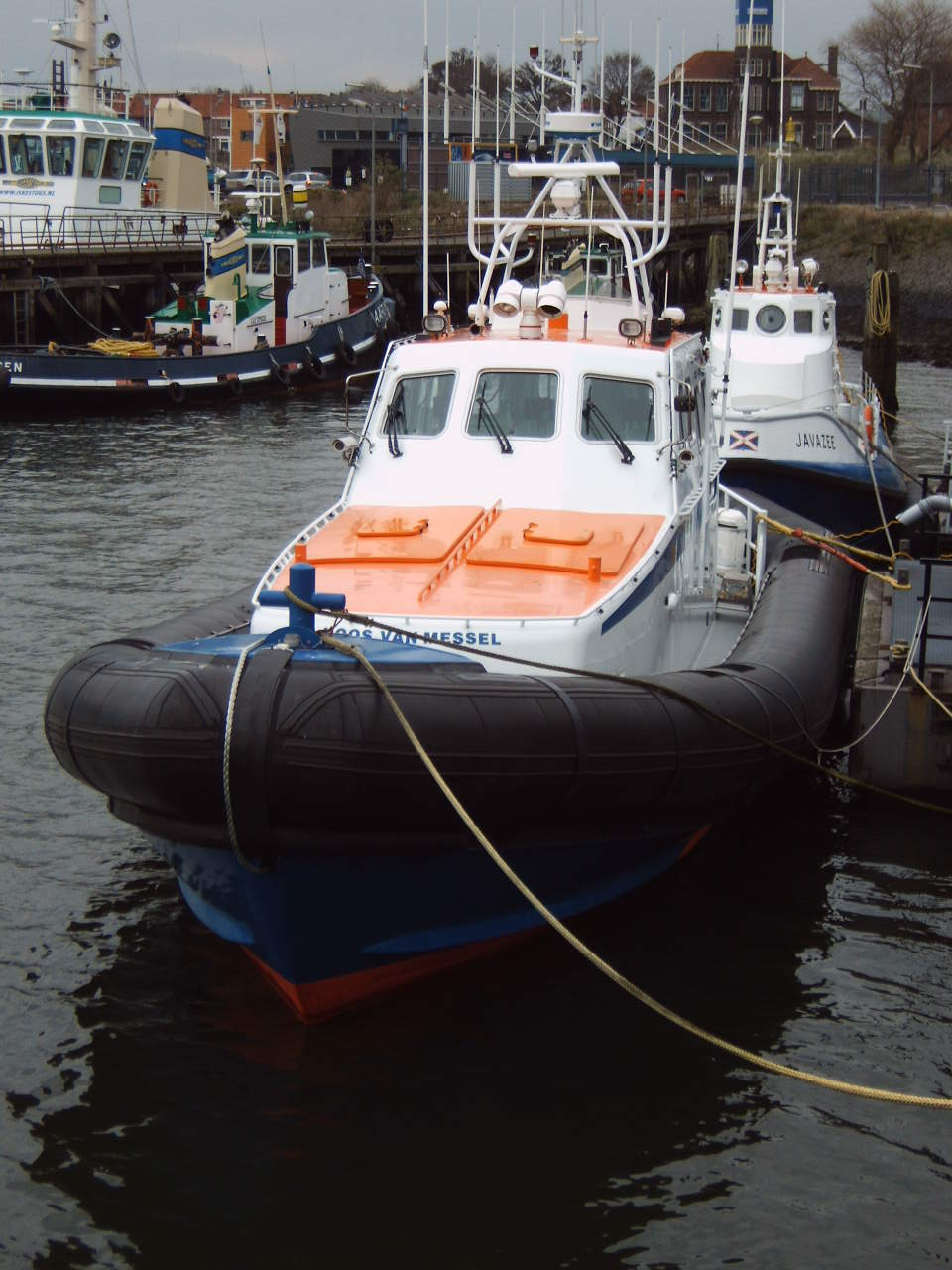
Lifeboat (Reddingboot) Koos van Messel from IJmuiden station

The Royal Netherlands Sea Rescue Institution (Dutch: Koninklijke Nederlandse Redding Maatschappij, abbreviated: KNRM) is the voluntary organization in the Netherlands tasked with saving lives at sea. For that purpose, it maintains 45 lifeboat stations along the Dutch coast of the North Sea and Wadden Sea and on the IJsselmeer. It maintains 78 boats ranging from small boat to 21 meter long RHIBs. It also provides lifeguard services at some beaches on the Frisian Islands in the Waddensea, and the beach of Wassenaar. Its headquarters have been in IJmuiden since 1996.

== History ==
The KNRM was created on 1 May 1991 by merging the Koninklijke Noord- en Zuid-Hollandsche Redding-Maatschappij (founded November 11, 1824), called the Noord (North), and the Koninklijke Zuid-Hollandsche Maatschappij tot Redding van Schipbreukelingen (founded November 20, 1824), called the Zuid (South). Between 1824 and 2006, they answered 36358 distress calls and saved 79887 people out of distress situations. Yearly they have about 1700 distress calls with about 3500 people saved (2008).

The KNRM also operates the Dutch Radio Medical Service (a task taken over from the Netherlands Red Cross on January 1, 1999) and provides medical advice by radio to about 900 ships each year.

Like the comparable Royal National Lifeboat Institution, which operates in the UK and Ireland, and the German Maritime Search and Rescue Service, the KNRM is entirely financed by private donations.

In November 2025 it was reported that the KNRM has commissioned the construction of thirteen new lifeboats. These boats will be built from 2026 by Frisian shipyard Dok en Scheepsbouw Woudsend BV in Woudsend and will be the largest lifeboat class operated by the KNRM.

== Famous lifeboat-saviors ==
- Dorus Rijkers

== Famous rescues ==
- Rescue of the Renown

== See also ==
Similar organizations in other countries:

Europe

- Royal National Lifeboat Institution (Ireland and the United Kingdom)
- Société Nationale de Sauvetage en Mer (France)
- German Maritime Search and Rescue Service (Germany)
- Norsk Selskab til Skibbrudnes Redning (Norway, also called Redningsselskapet)
- Maritime Safety and Rescue Society (Spain)

Elsewhere

- International Life Saving Federation
- Whitfords Volunteer Sea Rescue Group - One of the 2 last independent charitable lifeboat stations left in Western Australia, the rest are government co-ordinated. There is no state or nationwide equivalent of KNRM or RNLI.
