= Dave Wedge =

American author, journalist, and podcaster

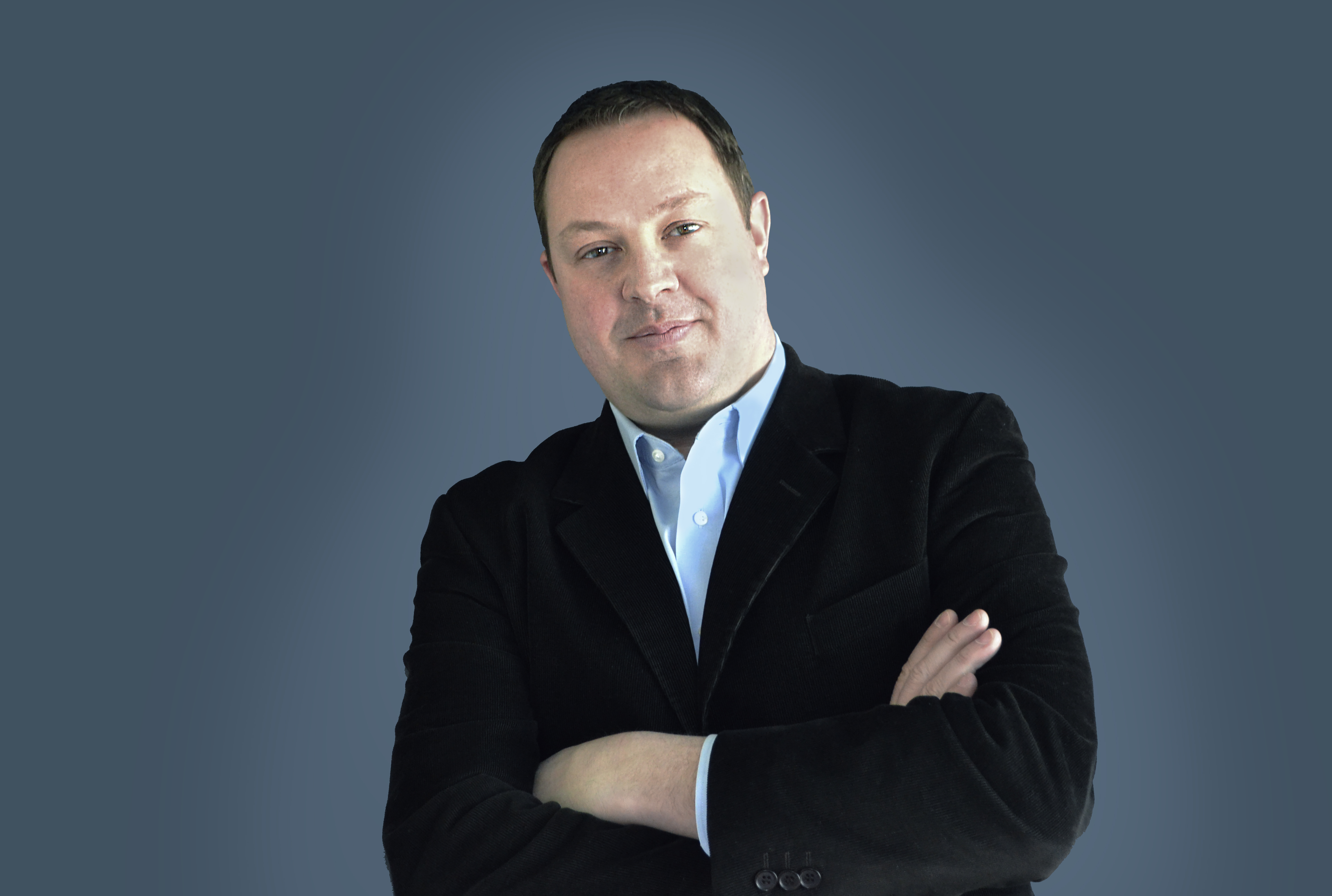
- Author, journalist Dave Wedge
- Born: July 31, 1970 (age 56); Brockton, Massachusetts, U.S.
- Education: Boston College (BA)
- Occupations: Author, journalist, podcast host
- Employer(s): Freelance; formerly Boston Herald
- Known for: Boston Strong, Ice Bucket Challenge, 12: The Inside Story of Tom Brady's Fight for Redemption
- Spouse: Jessica Heslam
- Children: 2
- Website: davewedge.com

David M. Wedge (born July 31, 1970) is a New York Times-bestselling author, journalist, podcast host and award-winning former reporter for the Boston Herald.

== Career ==
=== Literature ===
==== As an author ====
Wedge's first book, titled Boston Strong: A City's Triumph Over Tragedy and co-written with author Casey Sherman, was released in February 2015 by University Press of New England. Boston Mayor Marty Walsh wrote the foreword for the book, which is a non-fiction drama about the Boston Marathon bombing. Material from the book was used for the movie Patriots Day (2016), starring Mark Wahlberg, John Goodman and J.K. Simmons and directed by Peter Berg. The book was also part of a display on the Boston Marathon attacks at the National Crime Museum in Washington, D.C.

Wedge and Sherman teamed up again to tell the life story of Pete Frates, a Boston College baseball player with ALS who was the inspiration for the Ice Bucket Challenge social media phenomenon. The book, titled Ice Bucket Challenge: Pete Frates and the Fight Against ALS, features a foreword by Boston Bruins hall of famer Ray Bourque and was released in September 2017. In 2018, it was announced that Netflix is developing a film based on the book with actor/producer Casey Affleck.

In February 2017, it was announced that Wedge and Sherman would be writing a book based on the saga of New England Patriots star Tom Brady and his improbable win in Super Bowl LI. The authors are working with screenwriters Paul Tamasy and Eric Johnson, who wrote The Fighter, The Finest Hours and Patriots Day. The book, titled 12: The Inside Story of Tom Brady's Fight for Redemption, came out July 31, 2018. It appeared on The New York Times bestseller list in September 2018. An updated paperback edition of "12," with new chapters about Brady's move to the Tampa Bay Buccaneers, was released in September 2020.

In May 2019, Wedge and Sherman co-authored their fourth book together, Hunting Whitey: The Inside Story of the Capture and Killing of America's Most Wanted Mob Boss, a non-fiction narrative about the Whitey Bulger case. The book, which focuses on Bulger's life on the run, capture, life in prison and 2018 murder, was released in spring 2020 via HarperCollins. In October 2019, it was announced that a TV series based on the book was in development with Double Nickel and Sky Studios. The book was featured on CBS This Morning with Jeff Glor. In 2023, it was announced that "Hunting Whitey" would be adapted for a stage show at the Wilbur Theater in Boston, starring Neal McDonough. In May 2026, it was announced that the book was a basis for a three-part docuseries for Hulu narrated and produced by Ben Affleck with Wedge and Sherman.

In 2019, Wedge and Sherman teamed up with bestselling author James Patterson for The Last Days of John Lennon, a true crime story of Lennon's life and murder. The book was released by Little Brown on Dec. 7, 2020, the day before the 40th anniversary of Lennon's death. The book debuted at number four on The New York Times bestseller list.

In 2022, Wedge co-authored Riding With Evil: Taking Down the Notorious Pagan Motorcycle Gang, a true crime story about retired federal agent Ken Croke's legendary two-year infiltration of the infamous biker gang. The book was released March 15, 2022, by William Morrow. Kirkus Reviews called the book "a breathless, enthralling thrill ride."

In 2024, it was announced that Wedge would be writing a book about middleweight boxing champ Marvelous Marvin Hagler. Titled Blood & Hate: The Untold Story of Marvelous Marvin Hagler's Battle for Glory, the book is due in spring 2025 via Hamilcar Publications. . The film rights to the book are under option by Academy Award-winner Sam Rockwell and a feature film is in development.

In 2026, Wedge published Blizzard of Lies, a nonfiction account of the death of Boston police officer John O'Keefe and the subsequent fallout surrounding the Karen Read case. The book was published by BenBella. Wedge discussed the book and the case in an interview with ABC News, published July 28, 2026. Blizzard of Lies debuted at No. 12 on The New York Times Best Sellers list for hardcover nonfiction in August 2026.

==== As a journalist ====
Wedge is a freelance journalist and regular contributor to Boston Magazine. His 2023 Boston Magazine story about Braintree Police Officer Bill Cushing and his K9 partner Kitt was republished in Reader's Digest in March 2024.

He has also been a contributor to VICE, Noisey, and Ultimate Classic Rock, among other outlets.

After working for a few years at small Massachusetts newspapers, he joined the Boston Herald in 1999 and covered such national news stories as the Boston Marathon bombing, the 1999 Worcester Cold Storage Warehouse fire, the 2000 Wakefield massacre, the September 11 attacks, and The Station nightclub fire. He also covered many local, state and national political stories, including the 2004 and 2008 presidential races.

He has also been a contributor to Stratton Magazine, Where (magazine), Esquire, DigBoston, Newsweek, Boston and Revolver, among other publications and websites.

Wedge is a frequent TV and radio commentator who has appeared on CNBC, CNN, Fox News, CBS Early Show, ABC's Good Morning America, WEEI Sports Radio in Boston, and several other local and national stations. He hosted a weekly radio show on WRKO, and was a regular contributor on The Emily Rooney Show on WGBH-FM in Boston.

==== As a music journalist ====
Dave has also covered music for a variety of outlets, writing features and profiles on a wide array of heavy metal, rap, dance and rock artists. He's interviewed some of the music world's biggest stars, including Gene Simmons, Ozzy Osbourne, Lemmy Kilmister, Marilyn Manson, Notorious B.I.G., Ray Manzarek of The Doors, Everlast of House of Pain, Blink 182's Tom DeLonge, Geoff Tate of Queensrÿche, Dave Mustaine of Megadeth, Tiësto, Moby, Rob Zombie, Johnny Rotten, Daryl Hall, and Glenn Danzig.

In addition to VICE, Noisey and THUMP, Dave has covered music for the Boston Herald, Esquire, Newsweek, DigBoston, Lambgoat, Revolver magazine, Big Shot, BullettMedia, Boston magazine, and the now-defunct music site, LimeWire.

In October 2016, a lengthy investigative piece by Wedge on molestation allegations against hip-hop pioneer Afrika Bambaataa was published at VICE.com and in its October print edition.

In 2013, Wedge had an exclusive interview with rap pioneers The Geto Boys about their reunion that was the cover story for DigBoston. The piece featured a rare interview with eccentric dwarf rapper Bushwick Bill, in which he revealed that he was "drugged up" and incoherent when he was photographed being wheeled on a hospital gurney by his bandmates Scarface (rapper) and Willie D immediately after he was infamously shot in the eye by his girlfriend during a domestic dispute.

"My eye was really sitting on my cheek. Now that I look back at it, every time I look at that album cover, it reminds me what not to do. Not to take matters into my own hands and leave it to God." - Bushwick Bill to DigBoston, June 19, 2013

In April 2014, Dave was co-host of "Hardcore News" on DigRadio with singer/artist Dave Tree, and did one of the final interviews with GWAR frontman Oderus Urungus (aka Dave Brockie) just days before Brockie died of a heroin overdose.

In 2019, Dave began writing for Ultimate Classic Rock.

=== Broadcasting ===
In 2021, Wedge and his co-author Casey Sherman launched "Saints, Sinners & Serial Killers," a true crime podcast on the Muddhouse Media network. Season one included episodes about the Boston Marathon bombings, Whitey Bulger and the Boston Strangler case.

Wedge is a frequent TV and radio commentator who has appeared on CNN, Fox News, CBS' The Early Show, ABC's Good Morning America, WEEI Sports Radio in Boston, and several other local and national stations. He hosted a weekly radio show called "Terror on Trial" on WRKO during the 2015 trial of Dzhokhar Tsarnaev, was a regular contributor on The Emily Rooney Show on WGBH in Boston and hosted a news/music and pop culture show on the now-defunct DigRadio, a Boston online radio station.

In 2013, Wedge was featured in "#TwitterRevolution," a two-hour documentary that explored the impact of Twitter on the media and American culture.

=== In film ===
Boston Strong was acquired by 20th Century Fox in 2014 and was in development as a feature film at Fox before it merged with another project based on the 2013 Boston Marathon terror attacks. The two projects merged into Patriots Day a feature film starring Mark Wahlberg, John Goodman, Michelle Monaghan and J.K. Simmons and directed by Peter Berg. The film began shooting in Boston in February 2016 and was released in December 2016.

In 2008, Wedge appeared in "THS Investigates: Cults, Religion and Mind Control," a two-hour documentary about the devastating impact of religious cults. Wedge spoke about his extensive work for the Herald investigating a cult in Attleboro, Mass. that starved a baby to death in 1999 to fulfill a bizarre religious prophecy.

In 2013, Wedge had a small role in the independent film, Angels Around Me, playing a bar patron.

In 2018, it was announced that Wedge and Sherman's production company, Fort Point Media, partnered with Outside (magazine)'s film division to produce a feature based on the life story of extreme skier Doug Coombs. The film is based on the book Tracking the Wild Coomba: The Life of Legendary Extreme Skier Doug Coombs by author Robert Cocuzzo.

Also in 2018, it was announced that Netflix is developing a film based on Wedge and Sherman's book, Ice Bucket Challenge: Pete Frates and the Fight Against ALS, with actor/producer Casey Affleck.

In October 2019, Sky Studios and Double Nickel partnered with Wedge and Sherman's production company, Fort Point Media to adapt their forthcoming book, "Hunting Whitey," about the chase and murder of Boston Irish mob boss Whitey Bulger, for a TV series.

Wedge has also been a panelist and a moderator at ITVFest (Independent Television Festival) in Vermont, including leading panels with director/producer Bobby Farrelly and producer Kris Meyer.

In 2020, author James Patterson announced that a film is in development based on The Last Days of John Lennon, written with Wedge and Sherman.

Hunting Whitey — Wedge co-authored the book with Casey Sherman. The book later served as the basis for the Hulu docuseries Hunting Whitey Bulger, on which Wedge and Sherman served as executive producers.

=== Communications strategy ===
In 2014, Dave joined Boston communications firm Northwind Strategies, where he worked as a media consultant and adviser to a wide variety of corporate, political and non-profit clients. He was part of the team that worked on the Boston 2024 effort to bring the Olympics to Boston and also worked on the 2014 gubernatorial campaign of former Massachusetts Attorney General Martha Coakley. In 2017, Wedge joined State6, a communications firm in Boston.

In 2018, Wedge served as spokesman for Attorney Keith M. Davidson, who represented Stormy Daniels and Karen McDougal in cases involving President Donald Trump, as well as Shera Bechard, a Playboy Playmate reportedly involved with Republican fundraiser Elliott Broidy.

== Personal life ==
Wedge was born on July 31, 1970, in Brockton, Massachusetts. He is a 1988 graduate of Brockton High School and a 1993 graduate of Boston College. He is married to Boston Herald columnist Jessica Heslam and has two children.

== Awards and recognitions ==
Dave has won several journalism awards throughout his career, including a 2001 award for breaking news while he was at the Sun Chronicle. In 2003, he and Herald reporter Tom Farmer won a New England Press Association award for religious reporting for their coverage of an Attleboro cult. In 2008, Wedge was part of a team of reporters who won a New England Press Association award in the "Right to Know" category for a series on public officials' salaries. The same series was also awarded first place in the "Right to Know" category by the New England Associated Press News Executive Association in September 2008. In 2009, Dave won an investigative reporting award from the New England Associated Press News Executives Association for a report on criminals working in the taxpayer-subsidized film industry in Massachusetts.

In April 2014, the staff of the Boston Herald, including Wedge, was honored with the Sigma Delta Chi Award by the Society of Professional Journalists for the paper's coverage of the Boston Marathon bombing. In 2015, Wedge was honored in his hometown with a commendation from the Brockton City Council.

== Murphy v. Boston Herald, Inc., et al. ==
In 2005, Wedge and the Herald were named in the Murphy v. Boston Herald, Inc., et al. libel case filed by Massachusetts Superior Court Judge Ernest B. Murphy. In February 2005, the jury found that the Boston Herald and Wedge had libeled Judge Murphy. The jury awarded Murphy $2.09 million in compensatory damages, an award later reduced to $2.01 million. Shortly after the verdict, in an apparent attempt at "bullying" the Herald into a settlement, Judge Murphy wrote two letters on court letterhead to Herald publisher Patrick Purcell, demanding the publisher meet with him and deliver a $3.26 million check.

The verdict was appealed to the Massachusetts Supreme Judicial Court. Though the SJC acknowledged errors in the trial, the verdict was upheld in a ruling on May 7, 2007. The Herald and Wedge maintained the stories were accurate and that the court rulings were flawed.

In response to Judge Murphy's letters to the Herald, the Massachusetts Commission on Judicial Conduct recommended a 30-day suspension, a $25,000 fine, and a public censure for Murphy. In August 2008, Judge Murphy and the CJC reached an agreement that he was "permanently disabled" and he stepped down from the bench. Murphy applied for an early disability pension, but was denied by the SJC.
