= Sara Zandieh =

American film director

- Known for: Short film, Filmmaking, Film director
- Awards: Fulbright Scholar

Sara Zandieh is an American film director and screenwriter of Iranian descent. She holds an M.F.A. in film directing from Columbia University’s School of the Arts and is a recipient of a Fulbright grant for filmmaking. Zandieh’s 2010 short film The Pool Party won a jury award at the Tribeca Film Festival and she has since expanded into feature films, directing works such as A Simple Wedding, The Other Zoey, and Doin’ It. Additionally, in television Zandieh has directed episodes for network and streaming series.

== Works and career ==
=== Short films and early projects ===
In 2009, Sara Zandieh entered a story called The Pool Party in the Narrative Magazine 30 Below contest for writers between the ages of 18 and 30. She was among the top ten N30B finalists and a small prize for her effort.

In 2010, Zandieh directed The Pool Party. It is a 14-minute short film that was shot in Tehran just before the 2009-2010 Iranian election crisis. It documents the story of a male servant, who must fully repair a pool while acting as a surrogate father to the master's daughter. Zandieh combined social realism with allegory to illustrate the servant's struggle.

In 2012, she wrote and directed Reza Hassani Goes to the Mall, starring Maz Jobrani, premiered at Telluride Film Festival and won the Focus Features Best Film Award at Columbia University's festival.

=== Feature films ===
In 2018, Zandieh co-wrote and directed her debut feature, A Simple Wedding, an Iranian-American romantic comedy starring Tara Grammy, Rita Wilson, Shohreh Aghdashloo, Maz Jobrani, and others. It premiered at the LA Film Festival and later secured a theatrical release via Blue Fox Entertainment.

In 2023, she directed The Other Zoey, a romantic comedy film starring Drew Starkey, Josephine Langford, Andie MacDowell, and Heather Graham for Amazon Prime.

In 2024, Zandieh co-wrote and directed Doin' It, a comedy starring Lilly Singh as a 30-year-old virgin who becomes a high school sex education teacher. The film premiered at SXSW in 2024 and is set for wide theatrical distribution.

=== Television ===
In 2021 and 2022, Zandieh directed two episodes Good Girls and in 2025, she directed an episode of Grosse Pointe Garden Society. She was selected through Universal's Female Forward director program.

== 2010 Tribeca Film Festival ==
Zandieh's film was one of 47 short films screened in Lower Manhattan theaters. Like Tal Rosner, Zandieh is a returning director. Amongst other directors premiering films, she competed against Kirsten Dunst. Student kudos went to the winning short, Some Boys Don't Leave, "with special mention going to Sara Zandieh's The Pool Party."

On April 29, 2010, The Pool Party was shown at the Columbia University School of the Arts' 23rd Annual Film Festival.

== Awards ==
Zandieh won a 2009-2010 grant from the Fulbright Program, one of the most widely recognized international exchange programs in the world. She was one of 84 students from the United States selected by the United States Department of State for placements abroad, and was assigned to Turkey as a filmmaking student.

== Filmography ==
- Handsome Harry (2009)
- The Pool Party (2010)
- Reza Hassani Goes to the Mall (2012)
- A Simple Wedding (2019)
- The Other Zoey (2023)
- Doin' It (2024)
