= Christopher O'Shea =

American actor

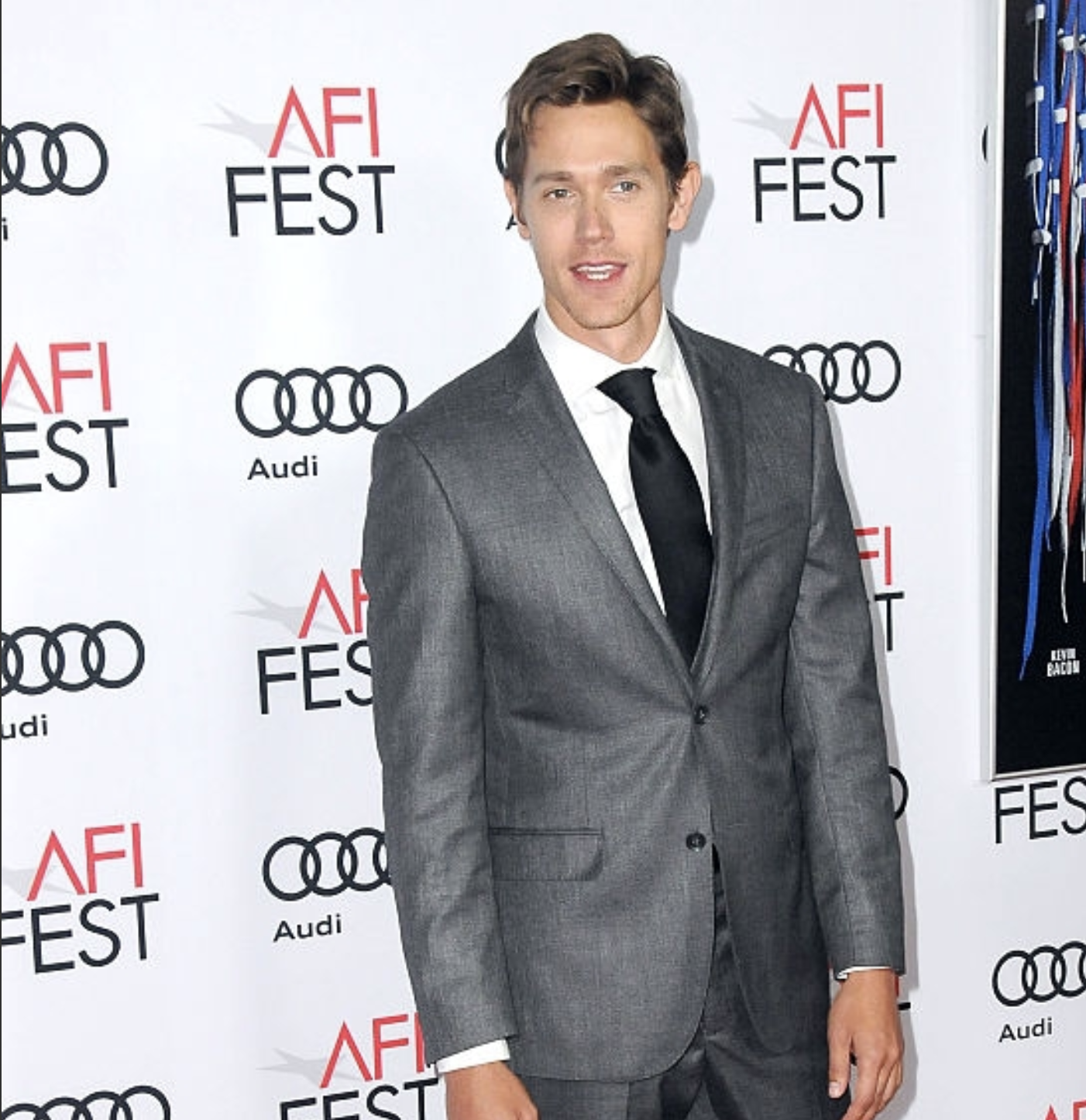
- O'Shea at Patriots Day Premiere
- Occupation: Actor
- Years active: 2002–present

Christopher O'Shea is an English actor best known for his debut role in the 2016 feature film Patriots Day, his role as Jareth Glover on the television series Madam Secretary, and his part as Professor Philip Farlow in the television sitcom Baby Daddy.

== Career ==
O'Shea was an extra in the 2002 movie Harry Potter and the Chamber of Secrets and the 2007 film Harry Potter and the Order of the Phoenix.

In 2009, he appeared in the short film, Dead Hungry, which was his first credited acting job. In 2014, he was a recurring character in the ABC Family (later Freeform) sitcom Baby Daddy, which was his first television role. From 2016 to 2017, he appeared in the CBS drama Madam Secretary as Jareth Glover, the English fiancé of Stevie McCord.

In 2016, he appeared in Boston Marathon bombing film Patriots Day. Also that year, he was cast in the film Alaska is a Drag.

In 2017, O'Shea starred in the romantic comedy, A Simple Wedding alongside Tara Grammy. He plays a Californian artist who falls in love with a second generation Persian woman and must bridge the cultural divide with her conservative family.

In 2018, O'Shea won a supporting role in the independent film A Modern Persuasion, a modern adaptation of Jane Austen's Persuasion.

From October 2018 to January 2019, O'Shea played the role of Spike in Tom Stoppard's The Hard Problem at the Lincoln Center.

In November 2020, O'Shea was cast in a recurring role on the third season of the Netflix psychological thriller series You. In 2022, he was cast as Percival Pickens, the primary antagonist in the second half of the sixth season of Riverdale.

== Filmography ==
=== Film ===
Year	Title	Role	Notes
2002	Harry Potter and the Chamber of Secrets	Book Store Customer	uncredited
2009	Dead Hungry	Brad	
2015	Con	Dickie	Short film
2016	Patriots Day	Patrick Downes	
2017	Alaska Is a Drag	Kyle	
2018	A Simple Wedding	Alex Talbot	
2019	Exit Strategy	Shane	
2020	Modern Persuasion	Tyler Pratt	

=== Television ===
Year	Title	Role	Notes
2014	Baby Daddy	Philip	Recurring
2015	Point of Honor	Robert Sumner	TV movie
2016–2017	Madam Secretary	Jareth Glover	Recurring; 7 episodes
2017	Me, Myself and I	Duane	Episode: "Family Tree"
2017	Chinese Burn	Ollie	
2017–2018	Gone	Noah	Recurring; 6 episodes
2020	The Rookie	Officer Chris Rios	2 episodes
2021	You	Andrew	Recurring; season 3
2021	Magnum P.I.	Oliver Kent	
2022	Riverdale	Percival Pickens	Recurring; season 6
