= Ice Bucket Challenge: Pete Frates and the Fight Against ALS =

Non-fiction book by Casey Sherman

- Author: Casey Sherman, Dave Wedge
- Language: English
- Genre: Non-fiction
- Publisher: ForeEdge
- Publication date: 2017
- Publication place: United States

Ice Bucket Challenge: Pete Frates and the Fight Against ALS is a non-fiction book by New York Times bestselling author Casey Sherman and author/journalist Dave Wedge that was published in 2017 by ForeEdge, a division of University Press of New England. The book tells the story of Pete Frates, a Boston College baseball player who was diagnosed with amyotrophic lateral sclerosis (ALS) in 2011, who helped launch the Ice Bucket Challenge viral sensation. The online craze went viral in 2014 and raised $225 million for ALS research, as celebrities, professional athletes and millions of people dumped buckets of icy water over their heads on video to raise money for research.

The book, which tells Frates's life story and describes how he helped launch the Ice Bucket Challenge, was released on September 4, 2017, with a celebration at Boston City Hall led by Mayor Marty Walsh. An official book launch gala in Frates's honor was held at Fenway Park with Boston Red Sox star David Ortiz, Mayor Walsh, comedian Lenny Clarke, retired Boston Bruins star Ray Bourque and other celebrities.

A film based on the book is in development with Wedge and Sherman as co-producers.
