= Doin' It (film) =

2024 film by Sara Zandieh

- Theatrical release poster
- Directed by: Sara Zandieh
- Written by: Sara Zandieh; Neel Patel; Lilly Singh
- Produced by: Anthony Bregman; Erica Matlin; Polly Auritt; Lilly Singh; Anita Verma-Lallian
- Starring: Lilly Singh; Sonia Dhillon Tully; Sabrina Jalees; Ana Gasteyer
- Cinematography: Jason Oldak
- Edited by: John Philpot
- Music by: Zachary Greer; Tom Westin
- Production companies: Likely Story; Unicorn Island Productions; Camelback Productions
- Distributed by: Aura Entertainment
- Release dates: March 12, 2024 (SXSW); September 19, 2025 (United States)
- Running time: 97 minutes
- Country: United States
- Language: English

Doin' It is a 2024 American comedy film written by Sara Zandieh, Neel Patel, and Lilly Singh and directed by Zandieh. Singh stars as a 30-year-old virgin who gets a job as a high school sex education teacher. Sonia Dhillon Tully, Sabrina Jalees, and Ana Gasteyer portray supporting characters in the movie. Studios Likely Story, Unicorn Island Productions, and Camelback Productions produced the film.

Doin' It premiered at the 2024 South by Southwest Film & TV Festival on March 12, and was released in theaters on September 19, 2025.

== Synopsis ==
Maya, a 30-year-old software engineer from a conservative Indian family, plans to launch an app for teens and works as a high school substitute teacher as a day job. Since she is a virgin, she is put in an uncomfortable situation when a principal assigns her to teach sex education.

== Cast ==
- Lilly Singh as Maya, a 30-year-old computer software engineer and school teacher
- Sonia Dhillon-Tully as Veena, Maya's conservative mother
- Sabrina Jalees as Jess, Maya's best friend
- Ana Gasteyer as Principal Fletcher, a school principal
- Stephanie Beatriz as Barbara, a school lunch lady
- Mary Holland as Linda, a racist rivaling teacher
- Utkarsh Ambudkar as Sohan, one of Maya's romantic interests
- Trevor Salter as Alex, one of Maya's romantic interests
- Ashley R. Singh as Crystal, a bold, fashion-forward South Asian character navigating identity, friendship, and sexuality.
- Jessica Clement as Madison

== Production ==
Sara Zandieh directed Doin' It and co-wrote the script with Neel Patel and Lilly Singh. Singh, Anthony Bregman, Erica Matlin, Polly Auritt, and Anita Verma-Lallian produced the film through the studios Likely Story, Unicorn Island Productions, and Camelback Productions.

== Release ==
South by Southwest (SXSW) selected Doin' It to screen as part of its Narrative Spotlight category at the 2024 SXSW Film & TV Festival. It premiered on March 12 at the Stateside Theater.

== Reception ==
On the review aggregator website Rotten Tomatoes, 50% of 6 critics' reviews are positive.

Proma Khosla wrote a mixed review for IndieWire, stating that "the gags are fun, but like everything else they feel unfinished — the seed of a full joke that will leave you wanting more. There are laughs aplenty, and Singh is completely at ease in a starring role, selling the material even in its weaker moments."

Peter Debruge of Variety gave the film a negative review, writing that it "wants to preach sex positivity, but feels stuck in the immature, shock-comedy mode of American Pie and early Farrelly brothers movies." Angie Han of The Hollywood Reporter wrote that "the comedy never quite settles into a comfortable rhythm, and eventually backs itself into a corner so far away from any recognizable reality that it threatens to undermine the very message it wants to send."
