= Murphy v. Boston Herald, Inc. =

Murphy v. Boston Herald, Inc., et al. is a libel case brought by Judge Ernest B. Murphy against the Boston Herald and Dave Wedge which centers on a series of articles about the New Bedford Superior Court judge that were published by the Herald.

== Background ==
Also named in the suit were Herald reporters and columnists Jules Crittenden, Margery Eagan and David Weber. According to official court documents, "at the close of the evidence, the trial judge entered judgment in favor of Eagan and Weber pursuant to Mass. R. Civ. P. 50 (a), 365 Mass. 814 (1974). The jury returned their special verdict finding Crittenden not liable. None of the three is involved in this appeal."

The Boston Herald published the first articles about Judge Murphy on February 13, 2002 in a front-page story that used the headline "Murphy's Law; Lenient judge frees dangerous criminals." The article, written by Wedge and Crittenden, depicted Judge Murphy as "callously indifferent to victims" and quoted unnamed courthouse sources that claimed Judge Murphy had said about a rape victim: "'She's 14. She got raped. Tell her to get over it.'"

Judge Murphy denied ever making the alleged rape comment but after the Herald published the stories he was "bombarded with hate mail, death threats and calls for his removal from the bench." Someone in a Boston Herald internet chatroom even said that Murphy's own daughters "should be raped."

In June 2002, Judge Murphy filed suit against Wedge and the Herald claiming that his reputation had been damaged and that he had been emotionally scarred.

On March 7, 2002, Wedge appeared on Fox News's The O'Reilly Factor and said Judge Murphy coddled defendants and "caused headlines for making disparaging remarks to victims." Wedge's comments were cited as being "crucial" in Murphy's libel case against Wedge and the Herald.

== Trial ==
In January 2005, the case of Murphy v. Boston Herald, Inc., et al. began.

Wedge testified under oath that two sources told him about Judge Murphy's alleged comments regarding the 14-year-old rape victim. Wedge understood, according to his testimony, that these two sources were not present when the rape comment was allegedly made by Judge Murphy. According to Wedge, he then confirmed the quote with a third source who was present when Judge Murphy allegedly made the comment about the rape victim. He "refused to concede that his front-page story on Murphy was at all flawed."

The court found Wedge's testimony in the trial to be "thoroughly and convincingly impeached by his own deposition testimony," which he gave in July and August 2002. At the deposition, "Wedge contradicted his trial testimony in every material respect."

During the trial, the jury also heard testimony from Wedge's three sources, Bristol County District Attorney Paul F. Walsh, Jr. and Assistant District Attorneys Gerald Fitzgerald and David Crowley. Fitzgerald testified that he told Wedge that Judge Murphy said "tell her to get over it." Crowley, the source who claimed to be present when Murphy made the alleged comment, testified that "the gist of the quotes in what was said appear to be accurate," but that he did not remember Judge Murphy using the words "tell her." Walsh said Crowley told him about Murphy's remarks in the lobby conference and acknowledged he did not know whether the judge said, "get over it," "she needs to get over it," or "tell her to get over it."

Murphy testified that the quotes attributed to him by defense witnesses were "absolutely preposterous."

In February 2005, the jury found that the Boston Herald and David Wedge had defamed Judge Murphy and published false information about him. The jury awarded Murphy $2.09 million in compensatory damages, an award later reduced to $2.01 million.

Shortly after the verdict, in an apparent attempt at "bullying" the Herald into a settlement, Judge Murphy wrote two letters on court letterhead to Herald publisher Patrick Purcell, demanding the publisher meet with him and deliver a $3.26 million check.

== Appeal ==
The Herald appealed to the Massachusetts Supreme Judicial Court, but on May 7, 2007 the court upheld the verdict.

In a unanimous decision "sharply critical of the newspaper and its reporter, David Wedge," the Supreme Judicial Court said "there is an abundance of evidence that, taken cumulatively, provides clear and convincing proof that the defendants either knew that the published statements found by the jury to be libelous were untrue or that they published them in reckless disregard of the probable falsity."

The court found the evidence in the case supported the jury's verdict of actual malice. The Supreme Judicial Court opinion, written by Justice John Greaney, said that "by the end of Wedge's testimony, his credibility on any material factual point at issue was in tatters."

== Reaction and response ==
In the wake of the failed appeal, Boston Herald publisher Patrick Purcell released a statement saying "We are disappointed with the Supreme Judicial Court's relentlessly one-sided view of Dave Wedge's reporting on a public controversy within the judicial system, and are unwavering in our complete confidence in Wedge's journalistic skills." Purcell referred to the letters he received from Judge Murphy saying, Murphy "correctly predicted the Herald had 'zero chance' that his colleagues on the bench would side with the Herald rather than one of their own" and that "no shred of evidence exists, as Justice Greaney alleged in his opinion, that Wedge altered the quotation provided by his trusted sources."

Wedge released his own public statement in which he "vehemently" disagreed with the SJC's decision and continued to "firmly stand by" his reporting on the stories.

On May 21, 2007, the Herald filed a petition requesting the court reconsider its decision, alleging that the SJC judges made several errors in their ruling, including misquoting Crowley's testimony and erroneously suggesting that Crowley said he heard Murphy make a sympathetic-sounding comment. The SJC acknowledged the error, as well as others, and corrected the record but denied the Herald's motion to reconsider, ending the case in the state's courts. The Herald paid Judge Murphy $3.4 million on June 7 to cover the jury award plus interest.

On July 10, the Massachusetts Commission on Judicial Conduct charged Judge Murphy with ethical violations including "willful misconduct" for the controversial letters he sent to Purcell. The CJC held a public hearing on Murphy's letters on October 15.

Murphy claimed in August that he suffered from post-traumatic stress disorder and asked Governor Deval Patrick to retire him early with a full pension, even though he hadn't earned retirement benefits. Patrick denied the request. The judge also filed a $6.8 million suit against the Herald's insurance company, claiming that the libel case should have been settled.

In November the CJC issued a 27-page report that found Murphy's letters to Purcell were "improper in tone and content" and recommended a public reprimand. The CJC recommended a 30-day suspension, a $25,000 fine and a public censure for Murphy for the letters. In August 2008, Judge Murphy and the CJC reached an agreement that he was "permanently disabled" and he stepped down from the bench.

In September 2012, the SJC ruled that Murphy was not entitled to a disability pension.
