= Pete Frates =

American baseball player, ALS activist (1984–2019)

- Born: John Peter Frates III; December 28, 1984; Beverly, Massachusetts, U.S.
- Died: December 9, 2019 (aged 34); Beverly, Massachusetts, U.S.
- Cause of death: Amyotrophic lateral sclerosis
- Education: Boston College (BA)
- Occupation: Baseball player
- Known for: ALS activism; Ice Bucket Challenge
- Spouse: Julie Kowalik (m. 2013)
- Children: 1 (Lucy)
- Website: petefrates.com

John Peter Frates III (December 28, 1984 – December 9, 2019) bka Pete Frates was an American college baseball player for the Boston College Eagles and an activist for amyotrophic lateral sclerosis (ALS) awareness. He is credited with helping the ALS Ice Bucket Challenge gain national attention, which raised approximately $220 million for ALS research.

== Early life ==
Pete Frates was born on December 28, 1984, in Beverly, Massachusetts. He grew up playing many sports, including baseball, hockey, and football. Frates attended his father's alma mater St. John's Preparatory School in Danvers, Massachusetts, and was an honor roll student there. At St. John's Prep, he was a four-year member of the varsity baseball, ice hockey, and football teams, and he served as captain of all three teams during his senior year. Before graduating in 2003, Frates was named an all-star in the Catholic Conference in both baseball and football, and helped St. John's Prep win two conference championships in both sports. Additionally, Frates was awarded Catholic Conference Honorable Mention recognition in hockey, and he also won St. John's Athletic Director's award in his senior year.

== College career ==
Upon graduating high school, Frates matriculated to Boston College to continue his baseball career, where his parents, John and Nancy, met. At Boston College, he played outfield from 2004 to 2007 and was elected team captain during his senior year. As a junior and a senior, he finished first on the team in home runs. In his senior year, he also led the team in both stolen bases and sacrifice hits, with nineteen and eight, respectively.

In his junior year during the Baseball Beanpot championship game against Harvard, Frates went 4-for-4 in a 10–2 win at Fenway Park. In that game, he hit a home run into Fenway Park's bullpen, a double, and three Runs batted in (RBIs). Additionally, in a single game against Maryland on April 14, 2007, during his senior year, he went 4-for-6 and recorded eight RBIs, including a grand slam, a three-run home run, and an RBI double. Frates' eight RBIs set the Boston College baseball record for the most RBIs recorded in a single game, which still stands as of 2019.

Frates graduated from Boston College in 2007 with a bachelor's degree in communications.

== Professional career ==
Upon graduating from Boston College in 2007, Frates continued playing baseball in Connecticut, the Hawaiian Winter Baseball league in Honolulu, and the German Baseball League in Hamburg. While playing in Germany, he also coached young German baseball players. He also traveled all over Europe with his best friend from high school and one of his teammates. Frates visited London, where his older sister, Jenn, and her husband Dan were living at the time, as well as Italy. After coaching and playing in Germany, Frates went back home to sell insurance and continued to play baseball in summer leagues.

In 2012, Frates was hired as Boston College's Director of Baseball Operations by head coach Mike Gambino. In this role, he created a "Mentor Night", also known as his "Baseball Mentoring Program", when former Boston College baseball players talk to the current players about what life after the game looks like. Additionally, even as the progression of his ALS prevented him from traveling with the team, he gave support, advice, and inspiration to the players.

== ALS advocacy ==
=== Diagnosis ===
After returning to the United States from Germany, he started to notice some changes about himself. He said that "it all started with some twitching in my upper body and arms," but later his performance on the baseball field started to decline.

In 2011, Frates was hit by a fastball on his left wrist during a men's league baseball game. He noticed that his wrist, although not broken, was not healing properly on its own; he said that "it was painful and weak, and it was starting to prevent me from doing things as simple as buttoning my shirt."

Additionally, Frates said "my day-to-day work schedule was being thrown into flux. Normally on the road by 6 a.m., I was now lucky to leave my apartment by 10 a.m.- often stopping for naps in the rest areas of the highway." Even after seeing a neuromuscular specialist, a hand specialist, and a neurologist, as well as undergoing months of testing, no diagnosis was able to be made.

One night, Frates decided to do some research of his symptoms on his own while watching October baseball with his father, and he discovered that his symptoms lined up with those of an ALS patient. After months of additional testing, he was officially diagnosed with ALS on March 13, 2012, at the age of 27.

=== ALS Ice Bucket Challenge ===
After receiving his diagnosis, Frates said that "it became abundantly clear that my calling was to raise ALS awareness and to fight for a brighter future for all those affected today and those yet to come."

Although Frates did not invent the Ice Bucket Challenge, his ALS activism helped it gain national attention and turn into a viral phenomenon. Throughout the summer of 2014, over 17 million people participated in the challenge to raise money to find a cure for ALS, and roughly 2.5 million people donated to ALS causes. Participants in the challenge included Tom Brady, Bill Belichick, Julian Edelman, Red Sox owner John Henry, Charlie Baker, Marty Walsh, Matt Ryan, David Beckham, Lebron James, Lady Gaga, George W. Bush, Oprah Winfrey, Steven Spielberg, Bill Gates, Donald Trump, Anna Wintour, Ethel Kennedy, and Angela Merkel.

The challenge is estimated to have raised over $220 million for ALS research. In 2016, a global sequencing effort funded by donations to the ALS Association from the challenge led to the discovery of a new gene tied to ALS, which could help scientists find a cure. The discovery also fueled investment in new communication technologies for ALS patients and helped move experimental treatments to clinical trials.

=== Lou Gehrig Day ===
In his August 2014 ALS Ice Bucket Challenge video at Fenway Park, Frates challenged then-Major League Baseball (MLB) Commissioner Bud Selig to make July 4 ALS Awareness Day in the MLB in honor of Lou Gehrig, who also had ALS, and led to the condition also being known as "Lou Gehrig's Disease". Lou Gehrig Day is now recognized in the MLB on June 2, which is the date that Gehrig became the Yankees' starting first baseman and also the date he died.

On October 22, 2014, prior to Game 2 of the World Series, the MLB recognized Frates for his work with a silver ice bucket from Bud Selig. Frates was unable to travel to Kauffman Stadium in Kansas City for the ceremony, but his parents and siblings accepted the bucket on his behalf.

Due to Frates' efforts in creating Lou Gehrig Day, he is honored in the "ALS and Baseball" exhibit in the National Baseball Hall of Fame and Museum, which also includes Lou Gehrig and Catfish Hunter. Frates' section includes the silver ice bucket gifted by Commissioner Selig, a glove and cap which he used during his time at Boston College, and the sunglasses and plastic bucket he used in his Ice Bucket Challenge video, which was all donated in June 2017. The exhibit additionally has one of the few remaining baseballs autographed by Frates, which was donated by his family in 2017.

== Legacy ==
The Pete Frates #3 Fund, which was started by the Frates family, raised money to pay for Frates' medical care. In order to help other ALS patients with their medical costs, the Frates family also created the Peter Frates Family Foundation. Additionally, the ALS Association worked with its Massachusetts chapter to create a program named after Frates to give in-home caregiving assistance to individuals with ALS.

Frates received numerous honors from the academic institutions that he attended. In August 2017, St. John's Prep revealed that it had dedicated its baseball field in Frates' name, and named him its 2018 distinguished alumnus. In order to collect funds for ALS, Boston College baseball plays in an annual ALS Awareness Game in his honor, which was founded in 2012, the same year of Frates' ALS diagnosis. During the 2016 ALS Awareness Game, Boston College retired Frates' number three jersey, which was the second number to be retired in Boston College baseball history. On June 26, 2019, Boston College announced that its new indoor baseball and softball facility, which opened at the beginning of the 2020–2021 academic year, would be named the "Pete Frates Center."

Frates was also honored by the Boston Red Sox on several occasions. Not long after his diagnosis, he was invited to throw out the first pitch at a Red Sox game. On March 3, 2015, both Red Sox and Boston College baseball players wore Frates' number three during a spring training scrimmage. On April 13, 2015, which was Opening Day of the Red Sox season, the team signed him to an honorary contract, and on September 6, 2019, the Red Sox gifted Frates a custom 2018 World Series Ring.

Frates was the recipient of several other honors and awards as well. In 2014, he was named Sports Illustrated's Inspiration of the Year, and in 2015 ESPN made a "SportsCenter" documentary about him, which was nominated for an Emmy. In 2017, National Collegiate Athletic Association (NCAA) President Mark Emmert awarded Frates the National Collegiate Athletic Association Inspiration Award. In the same year, September 5 was named "Pete Frates Day" in Boston by former Boston Mayor Martin J. Walsh. September 5 also saw the release of Ice Bucket Challenge: Pete Frates and the Fight Against ALS, a book written by BC alumnus Dave Wedge and Casey Sherman about Frates' life. The two authors donated half of their proceeds from the book's sales to the Frates family. Also in 2017, former Massachusetts Governor Charlie Baker signed a bill marking the first month of August in Massachusetts "Ice Bucket Challenge Week" in honor of Frates' activist work. In December 2018, Casey Affleck and Alison Greenspan agreed to help create a Netflix film about Frates.

== Personal life ==
On June 1, 2013, Frates married Julie Kowalik, who he had met while they were both students at Boston College. During the ceremony, which took place in Marblehead, Massachusetts, Frates got out of his wheelchair to walk Kowalik down the aisle. On August 31, 2014, their daughter, Lucy Fitzgerald, was born.

Frates died at the age of 34 on December 9, 2019.
