= A Simple Wedding =

Iranian-American romantic comedy film

- Film poster
- Directed by: Sara Zandieh
- Written by: Sara Zandieh; Stephanie Wu
- Starring: Tara Grammy; Christopher O'Shea; Rita Wilson; Shohreh Aghdashloo; Maz Jobrani; Houshang Touzie
- Music by: Nima Fakhrara
- Release date: September 2018 (LA Film Festival)
- Running time: 88 minutes
- Country: United States
- Language: English

A Simple Wedding is a 2018 American romantic comedy film directed by Sara Zandieh and starring Tara Grammy, Christopher O'Shea, Rita Wilson, Shohreh Aghdashloo, Maz Jobrani and Houshang Touzie.

A young Iranian-American woman, while trying to appease her parents and their need to see her settled down, unexpectedly finds love.

Wilson also served as an executive producer of the film.

== Plot ==
Iranian-American Nousha Hassani is a successful LA housing attorney in her early 30s, disinterested in marriage. However, she tries to appease her parents Ziba and Reza and their need to see her settled down with the perfect Persian husband. They regularly introduce her to conservative Iranian bachelors with the expectation that Nousha will enter into an arranged marriage.

Their plans are soon derailed when Nousha meets Alex Talbot, a charming bisexual artist/DJ. They both participate in a public protest against sexism and misogyny. Starting to fall in love, she worries whether her parents will accept their relationship.

When her traditional Muslim parents see Alex through a video call with Nousha, then at dinner discover they are living together as domestic partners, they insist they officially get married. Reza bullies Alex into agreeing, and the Talbots and Hassanis come together for dinner.

Alex isn't Muslim, and he has an unconventional family. His parents divorced when he was 16, and his father Bill married another man, Stephen. Alex's mother, Maggie Baker, is still bitter about it and has given up on love.

During the wedding organizing, Nousha's Uncle Saman comes to visit the family from Tehran. He is a war veteran who has never married and doesn't have kids, and gets pulled into the rehearsals as Alex's mother Maggie needs a partner for the procession. They hit it off.

The night before the ceremony, Nousha, showing signs of cold feet, asks Alex if they're making a mistake. He brushes her fears aside. However, on the day she panics, the dress catches fire, and she extinguishes it in the pool.

One week later, Nousha's friends Lynne, Tessa, and daughter Lulu show up to get her out of her funk. Finally, a few weeks later, she uses the excuse of wanting to return Alex's toothbrush to go to his gig. He won't accept her apology because he's still really upset she left him at the altar.

Maggie and Saman bump into Nousha at the gig, and outside tell her and Alex they've been together since the wedding and now are getting married. In the days leading up to the ceremony, Nousha does some soul searching, learning to enjoy her own company.

At the wedding, in the Housanis’ back yard, Saman encourages Nousha to keep fighting and not give up. She seranades Alex with Celine Dion's voice and they finally make up.

== Cast ==
- Tara Grammy as Nousha Hussueini
- Christopher O'Shea as Alex Talbot
- Shohreh Aghdashloo as Ziba Hussueini
- Rita Wilson as Maggie Baker
- Maz Jobrani as Uncle Saman
- Rebecca Henderson as Lynne
- Jaleh Modjallal as grandma

== Release ==
The film premiered at the LA Film Festival in September 2018. In February 2019, it was announced that Blue Fox Entertainment acquired worldwide distribution rights to the film. The film was released in theaters on February 14, 2020. Then it was released on DVD on June 9, 2020.

== Reception ==
The film has an 81% rating on Rotten Tomatoes. Jordaine Givens of Film Threat awarded the film an 8 out of 10. Tara McNamara of Common Sense Media gave the film four stars out of five.
