= Boston Strong (book) =

Book about the Boston Marathon bombings

Boston Strong: A City's Triumph Over Tragedy
- Authors: Casey Sherman and Dave Wedge
- Language: English
- Subject: Boston Marathon bombings
- Publication place: United States
- Media type: Print
- Pages: 272
- ISBN: 978-1611685596

Boston Strong: A City's Triumph Over Tragedy is a non-fiction book about the Boston Marathon bombings by The New York Times best-selling author Casey Sherman and veteran Boston journalist Dave Wedge. The book was released in February 2015 by University Press of New England. The book was used as a basis for the 2016 CBS Films motion picture Patriots Day, starring Mark Wahlberg, John Goodman, and J. K. Simmons, and directed by Peter Berg.
