= Patriots Day (film) =

2016 film by Peter Berg

- Theatrical release poster
- Directed by: Peter Berg
- Screenplay by: Peter Berg; Matt Cook; Joshua Zetumer
- Story by: Peter Berg; Matt Cook; Paul Tamasy; Eric Johnson
- Based on: Boston Strong by Casey Sherman; Dave Wedge
- Produced by: Scott Stuber; Dylan Clark; Mark Wahlberg; Stephen Levinson; Hutch Parker; Dorothy Aufiero; Michael Radutzky
- Starring: Mark Wahlberg; Kevin Bacon; John Goodman; J. K. Simmons; Michelle Monaghan; Jimmy O. Yang
- Cinematography: Tobias A. Schliessler
- Edited by: Colby Parker Jr.; Gabriel Fleming
- Music by: Trent Reznor; Atticus Ross
- Production companies: CBS Films; Closest to the Hole Productions; Leverage Entertainment; Hutch Parker Entertainment; Bluegrass Films
- Distributed by: Lionsgate
- Release dates: November 17, 2016 (AFI Fest); December 21, 2016 (United States)
- Running time: 133 minutes
- Country: United States
- Language: English
- Budget: $40–45 million
- Box office: $52.2 million

Patriots Day is a 2016 American action thriller film based on the Boston Marathon bombings in 2013 and the subsequent terrorist manhunt. Directed by Peter Berg and written by Berg, Matt Cook, and Joshua Zetumer, the film is based on the book Boston Strong by Casey Sherman and Dave Wedge. It stars Mark Wahlberg, Kevin Bacon, John Goodman, J. K. Simmons, and Michelle Monaghan. It marks the third collaboration between Berg and Wahlberg, following Lone Survivor and Deepwater Horizon. The title refers to Patriots' Day, the Massachusetts state holiday on which the Boston Marathon is held.

Principal photography began on March 29, 2016, in New York City, and also filmed in Boston, Los Angeles, New Orleans, and Philadelphia. The film premiered on November 17, 2016, at the AFI Fest. Distributed by CBS Films via Lionsgate, It was released in Boston, New York and Los Angeles on December 21, 2016, followed by a nationwide expansion on January 13, 2017. It received positive reviews for Berg's direction and the performances of its cast, and grossed $52 million against a $45 million budget. The film was chosen by the National Board of Review as one of the top ten films of 2016.

== Plot ==
On April 14, 2013, Boston Police Department Sergeant Tommy Saunders captures a suspect, injuring his knee in the process, and fails to convince Commissioner Ed Davis to let him off from a punishment duty the next day, working the Boston Marathon. During the marathon, brothers Dzhokhar and Tamerlan Tsarnaev detonate two bombs, causing widespread panic in Boston and around the world.

A young couple, Patrick Downes and Jessica Kensky, are injured in the bombing and taken to separate hospitals, where they are both required to have one leg each amputated. Steve Woolfenden, a family man, is also injured and separated from his toddler son Leo, who an officer takes to a safe location. FBI Special Agent in Charge Richard DesLauriers is assigned to investigate the bombing in collaboration with Davis and the police. In contrast, Tommy searches for evidence and helps people injured or separated from their loved ones in the chaos, including Patrick, Jessica, Steven, and Leo.

FBI analysts review footage of the bombing and identify Dzhokhar and Tamerlan as the assailants responsible, but DesLauriers is reluctant to release their photos to the public without further confirmation. His hand is forced when the photos are leaked to the press, while Watertown, Massachusetts Police Sergeant Jeffrey Pugliese's men begin conducting door-to-door searches for the pair. The Tsarnaev brothers kill Massachusetts Institute of Technology Police Department officer Sean Collier in a failed attempt to steal his pistol, and then carjack student Dun "Manny" Meng, telling him that they committed the marathon bombing, killed a policeman, and plan to conduct another bombing in New York City.

While Dzhokhar is in a gas station convenience store and Tamerlan is distracted, Meng escapes and takes refuge at another gas station across the street, where he calls the police. Tommy questions Meng about the ordeal and is given the stolen car's GPS tracking number. This leads police to the brothers' location in Watertown, where Tamerlan fires at them upon their arrival while Dzhokhar throws bombs, seriously wounding several officers. Eventually, Pugliese shoots Tamerlan in the ankle and subdues him. Dzhokhar attempts to run Pugliese over while fleeing in Meng's vehicle but fatally runs Tamerlan over instead.

Meanwhile, Tamerlan's wife, Katherine Russell, and Dzhokhar's college friends from UMass Dartmouth are detained by the FBI Hostage Rescue Team and questioned by the High-Value Interrogation Group. Russell refuses to disclose any knowledge of her husband's criminal activities, while Dzhokhar's roommates appear oblivious to his plans, despite having earlier found bomb components in his possessions.

Later in Watertown, resident David Henneberry finds Dzhokhar hiding in the covered boat in his backyard and calls Tommy and Superintendent William Evans. Dzhokhar is quickly surrounded and arrested by the FBI HRT after a standoff. Crowds cheer in the streets of surrounding neighborhoods while Tommy and his colleagues celebrate. The Boston police are invited to attend a Boston Red Sox game, where David Ortiz thanks them for their heroism and tells them to "stay strong".

The epilogue reveals that Dzhokhar was sentenced to death by lethal injection and is awaiting his appeal in federal prison. His three college friends were arrested for obstructing the bombing investigation and tampering with evidence, and authorities are continuing to seek information regarding Russell's possible involvement in the bombing.

== Cast ==
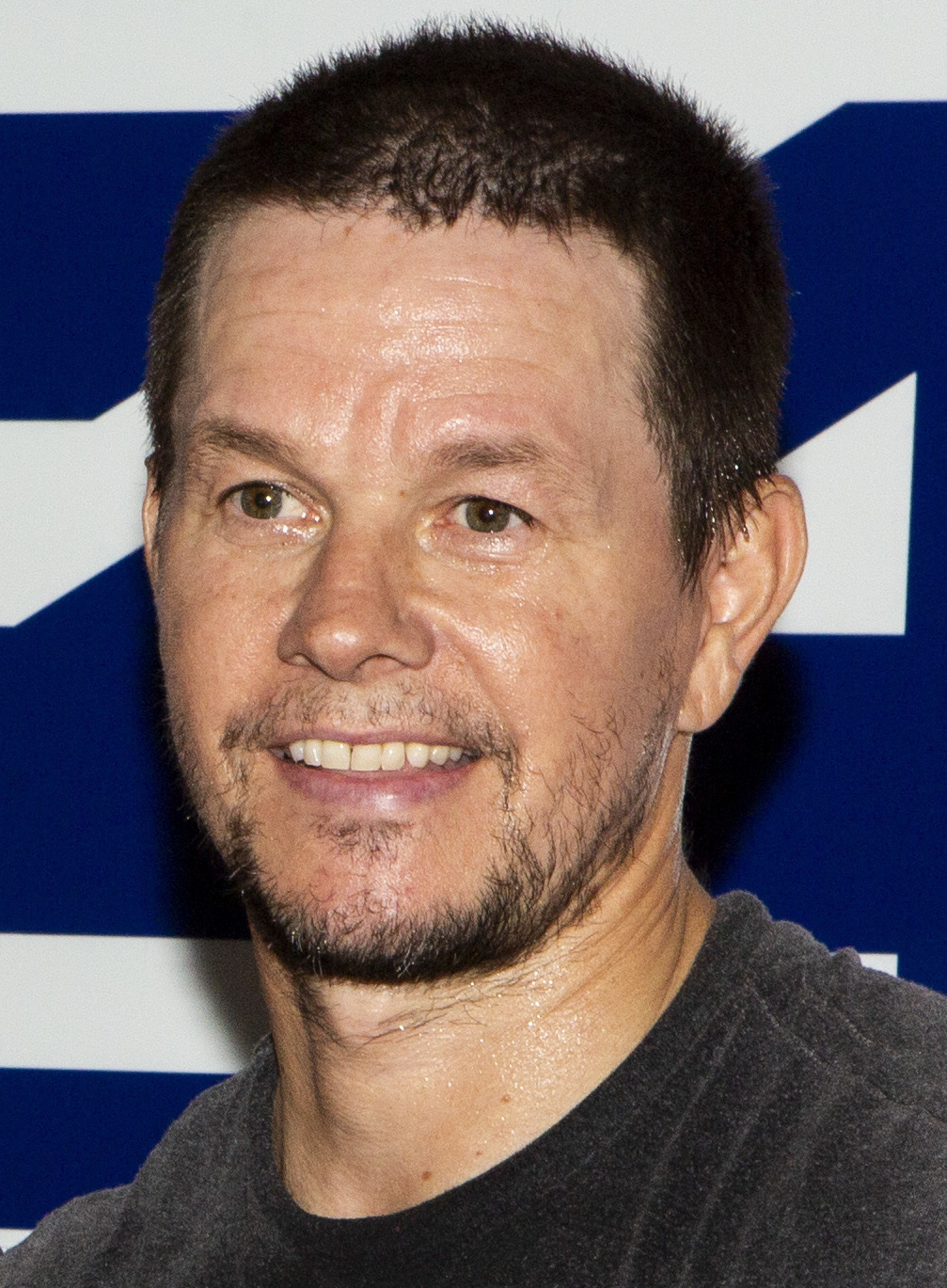
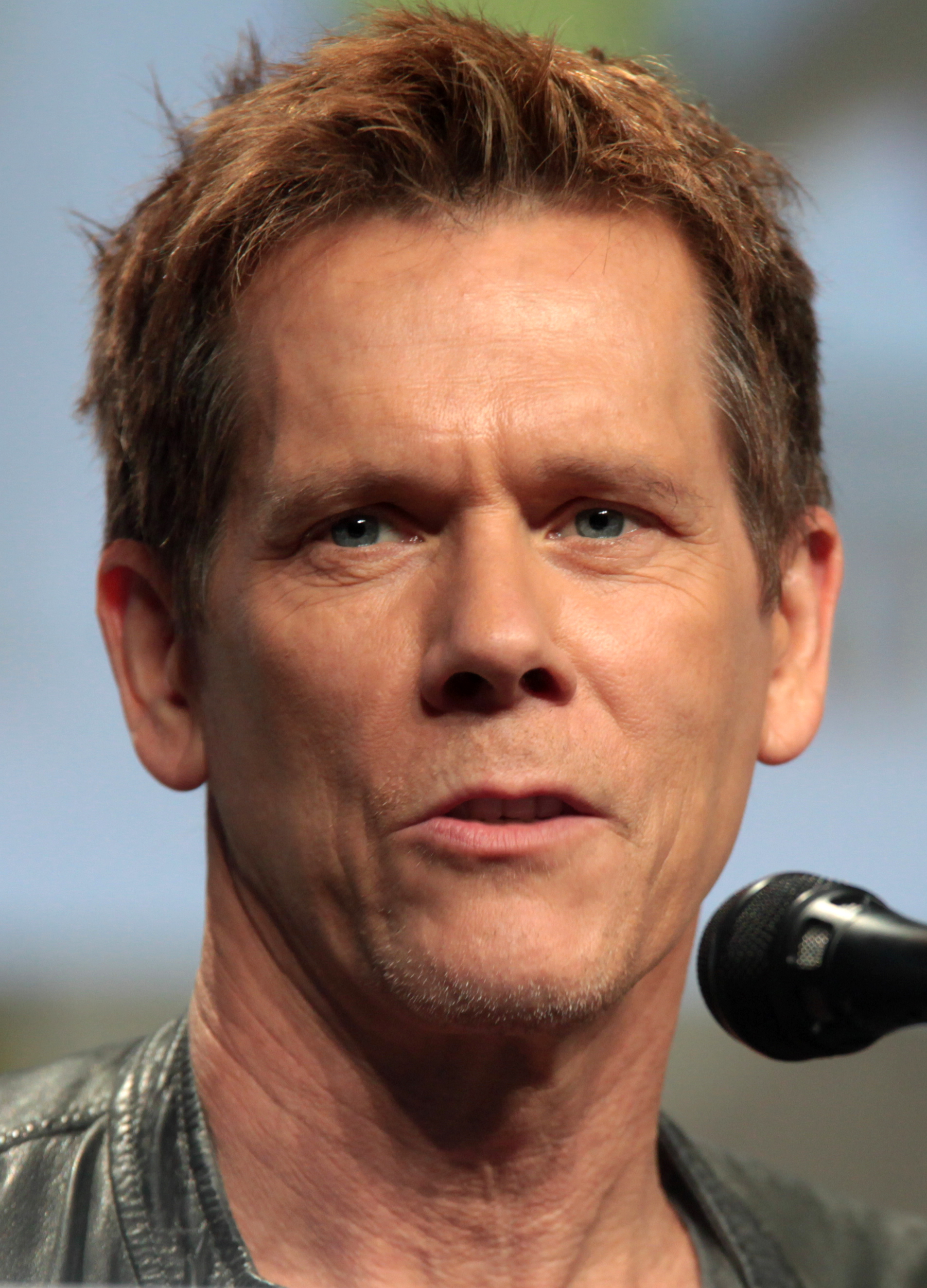
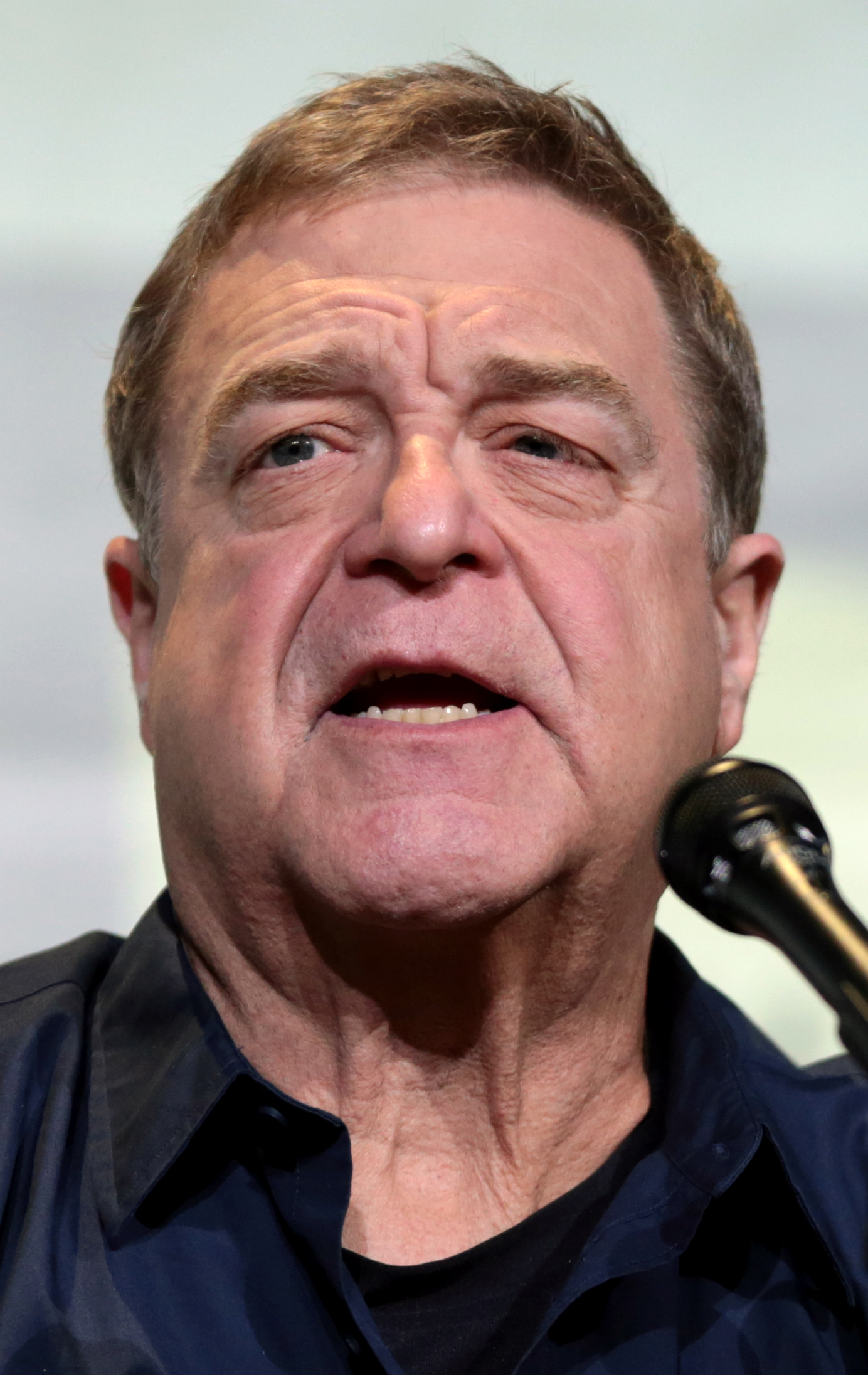
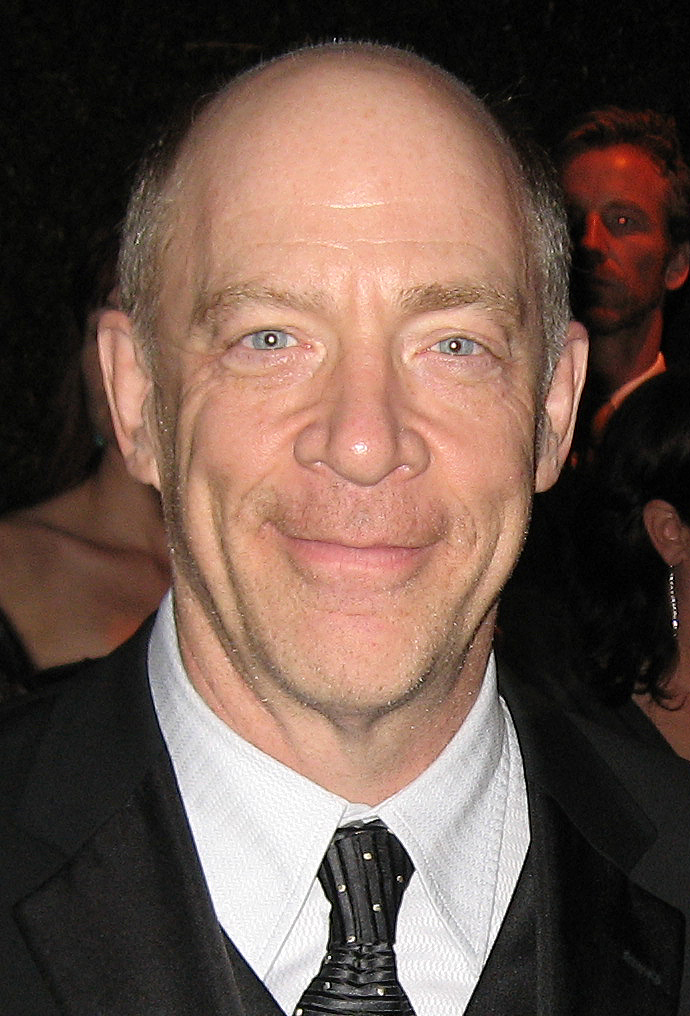
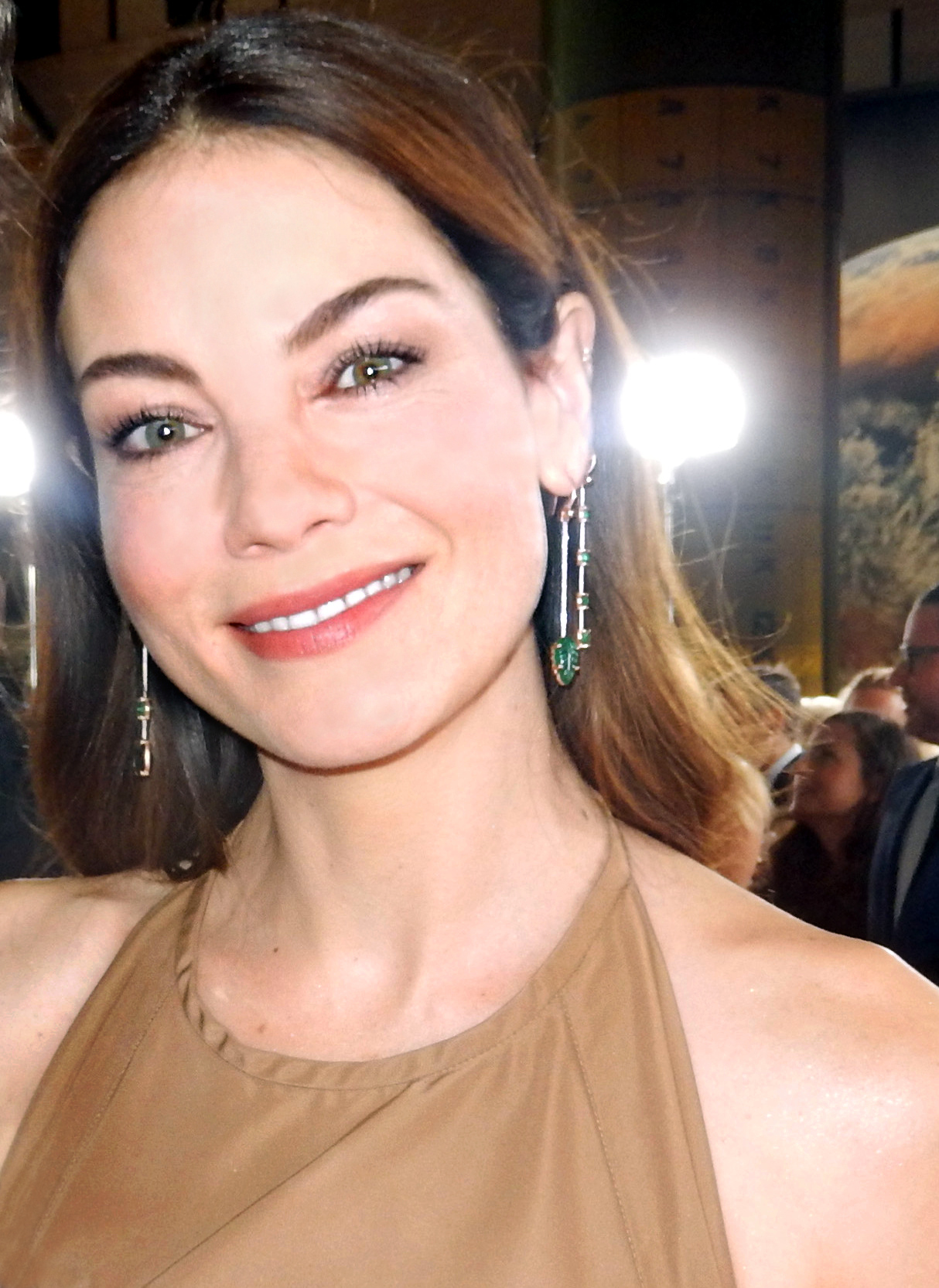
Mark Wahlberg, Kevin Bacon, John Goodman, J. K. Simmons and Michelle Monaghan portray five of the film's central characters.
- Mark Wahlberg as Boston Police Department Sergeant Tommy Saunders
- Kevin Bacon as Special Agent Richard DesLauriers, in charge of the FBI Boston field office
- John Goodman as Boston Police Commissioner Ed Davis
- J. K. Simmons as Watertown Police Sergeant Jeff Pugliese
- Michelle Monaghan as Carol Saunders, Tommy's wife and a registered nurse
- Alex Wolff as Dzhokhar Tsarnaev
- Themo Melikidze as Tamerlan Tsarnaev
- James Colby as Boston Police Superintendent William B. Evans
- Michael Beach as Governor of Massachusetts Deval Patrick
- Rachel Brosnahan as Jessica Kensky, who lost both of her legs in the bombings (one in 2013, one in 2015)
- Christopher O'Shea as Patrick Downes, who lost one of his legs in the bombings
- Jake Picking as Massachusetts Institute of Technology Police Department Officer Sean Collier, who was killed by the Tsarnaev brothers 79 hours after the bombings
- Lana Condor as Li, Massachusetts Institute of Technology student and Sean's prospective girlfriend
- Jimmy O. Yang as Dun Meng, the driver the Tsarnaevs carjacked 80 hours after the bombings
- Vincent Curatola as Boston Mayor Thomas Menino
- Melissa Benoist as Katherine Russell, Tamerlan Tsarnaev's wife
- Khandi Alexander as Veronica the interrogator
- Adam Trese as FBI Supervising Special Agent John Bradshaw

In addition, cameo appearances include: David Ortiz walking from the dressing room to the field at Fenway Park, before switching to archival footage of him speaking to the crowd the day after Dzhokhar Tsarnaev was captured; Dun Meng inside a pizza restaurant in a scene where actor Yang – sitting at an adjacent table – is portraying him; David Henneberry, who found Dzhokhar Tsarnaev hiding in his boat, as an unnamed citizen standing on a front porch, briefly talking with Wahlberg's character.

== Production ==
=== Development ===
The film was one of three originally proposed about the bombings, the other two being Boston Strong (based on the book of the same title), set to be directed by Daniel Espinosa and starring Casey Affleck; and Stronger, about bombing victim Jeff Bauman, starring Jake Gyllenhaal. CBS Films purchased the rights to Boston Strong and merged it into the existing script. Stronger was produced separately and released on September 22, 2017; Lionsgate distributed that film in conjunction with its subsidiary Roadside Attractions.

On March 31, 2015, CBS Films announced it was producing the film as Patriots' Day, depicting the 2013 Boston Marathon bombing and manhunt. The script, written by Matt Charman, focused on Boston Police Commissioner Edward F. Davis. The film is also based on the book Boston Strong and material from 60 Minutes. Its final version, not focused specifically on Davis, was written by Peter Berg, Matt Cook, and Joshua Zetumer; Mark Wahlberg plays police officer Sgt. Tommy Saunders, a fictional character meant to be a composite of all the Boston police involved in the manhunt, and Michelle Monaghan plays his wife Carol. Wahlberg produced the film along with Scott Stuber, Dylan Clark, Stephen Levinson, Michael Radutzky, Hutch Parker and Dorothy Aufiero. By February 2016, the apostrophe in the title was dropped, making it Patriots Day. Also by then, J. K. Simmons had joined the cast as Watertown PD Sgt. Jeffrey Pugliese.

CBS Films and Lionsgate co-financed the film, with Lionsgate handling distribution. On March 8, 2016, Jimmy O. Yang joined the film's cast as Dun Meng, who was carjacked by the Tsarnaev brothers. On the same day, Vincent Curatola was cast as the mayor of Boston, Thomas Menino, who was serving his fifth term when the bombings took place. On March 11, 2016, John Goodman signed on to play former Boston Police Commissioner Ed Davis. On March 25, 2016, James Colby joined the film to play William B. Evans, a Boston PD superintendent, and following him, Michelle Monaghan joined to play Carol Saunders, Tommy's wife. On March 31, Kevin Bacon joined the cast as FBI agent Rick Deslauriers, and on April 4, 2016, Alex Wolff and Themo Melikidze were cast in the film as Dzhokhar and Tamerlan Tsarnaev, responsible for the bombing and later manhunt. Michael Beach later joined the film to play Massachusetts governor Deval Patrick.

On April 6, 2016, Rachel Brosnahan and Christopher O'Shea joined the film to play newlyweds Jessica Kensky and Patrick Downes, who were at the finish line and seriously injured. The next day, Lana Condor was cast as Sean Collier's prospective girlfriend. On May 5, 2016, Melissa Benoist was cast as Katherine Russell, the widow of Tamerlan Tsarnaev, with Khandi Alexander set to play law enforcement interrogator Veronica, and Jake Picking as MIT Police Officer Sean Collier, who was killed 79 hours after the bombing. David Ortiz, who retired from the Boston Red Sox after the 2016 season, appears as himself.

=== Filming ===
Principal photography began on March 29, 2016, and was conducted in New York City; Boston; Quincy, Massachusetts; Los Angeles; New Orleans; and Philadelphia, with production offices and a soundstage set up in one of the Centennial Park warehouses in Peabody, Massachusetts. All interior scenes at the FBI warehouse headquarters, as well as exterior 'command tent' scenes, were shot there. Filming was arranged on Laurel Street in Watertown to recreate the shootout that took place there between police and the Tsarnaev brothers; but after objections by residents, town officials denied permission for the location. The City of Malden was approached to stand in for Laurel Street, and ended up with eight locations in the film. Producers then approached University of Massachusetts Dartmouth for permission to shoot scenes at the campus, but the request was denied by chancellor Gerry Kavanaugh. Simmons University stood in for exterior shots of UMass Dartmouth. This was because the latter would not permit the production to film on campus on account of its belief that doing so would be "too disruptive" to the school's community. The Massachusetts Institute of Technology, where the Tsarnaev brothers killed MIT Police Officer Sean Collier, allowed the film production to shoot "entirely peaceful scenes" on the campus for three days in June. Filming also took place at Collier's actual house. The marathon finish line on Boylston Street was duplicated at the Naval Air Station South Weymouth, in addition to scenes filmed at the actual finish line on the day of the 2016 marathon. Dzhokhar's capture was filmed in Framingham, Massachusetts, on the bombing's third anniversary. Additional filming took place at Doyle's Cafe in Jamaica Plain on April 14, 2016, Watertown, Massachusetts, for shots of the police station and the sequence depicting Dun Meng escaping to the Mobil Gas station unlike the surveillance footage which was shot in Cambridge, Massachusetts, and at Lasell College in Newton, Massachusetts, on May 18, 2016.

The film is also interspersed with actual CCTV footage of the bombing and later sightings of the brothers.

=== Music ===
Nine Inch Nails members Trent Reznor and Atticus Ross were hired to write the musical score for the film.

"Forever (2007 version)" by Dropkick Murphys plays during the closing credits of the film; however, it is not included on the film's soundtrack.

== Release ==
Patriots Day premiered on the closing night of the AFI Fest on November 17, 2016. It had a red carpet premiere at the Boch Centre Wang Theatre on December 14, 2016. The film was released in New York, Boston, Los Angeles, New Orleans, Philadelphia, Sofia, Bulgaria, and Paris, France, on December 21, 2016, followed by a wide release on January 13, 2017.

== Reception ==
=== Box office ===
Patriots Day grossed $31.9 million in the United States and Canada and $20.2 million in other territories for a worldwide total of $52.2 million, against a production budget of $45 million.

In North America, the film had its expansion alongside the openings of Monster Trucks, The Bye Bye Man, and Sleepless, as well as the wide expansions of Silence and Live by Night, and was expected to gross $18–20 million from 3,120 theaters in its four-day MLK opening weekend. It made $560,000 from Thursday night previews, less than the $860,000 made by Berg and Wahlberg's Deepwater Horizon in September. The film ended up opening to $12.9 million (a four-day total of $14.2 million), finishing below expectations and 6th at the box office.

=== Critical response ===
On review aggregator Rotten Tomatoes, the film holds an approval rating of 80% based on 237 reviews, with an average rating of 6.9/10. The website's critical consensus reads, "Patriots Day offers a stirring, solidly crafted tribute to the heroes of a real-life American tragedy without straying into exploitative action thriller territory." On Metacritic, the film has a weighted average score of 69 out of 100, based on 42 critics, indicating "generally favorable reviews". Audiences polled by CinemaScore gave the film a rare "A+" on an A+ to F scale.

Peter Debruge of Variety wrote: "It's genuinely exciting megaplex entertainment, informed by extensive research, featuring bona fide movie stars, and staged with equal degrees of professionalism and respect." Wendy Ide of The Observer gave it 4/5 stars, writing, "As a police procedural, this is first-rate: unflinching, briskly paced film-making that pieces together the fast-moving investigation in a wholly satisfying manner." The Hindu's Deborah Cornelious said, "Each time Berg uses real images and actual news footage from April 2013 – including cameos from the people the characters are based on – it only validates the audience reaction to the city's people and its law enforcement agencies. And you'll end up leaving Patriot's Day feeling buoyant after seeing how the city of Boston reacted to the bombings." Robbie Collin of The Daily Telegraph gave it 3/5 stars, calling it "stirring, well-acted, moving and built with conviction and flair."

The Atlantic's David Sims was more critical, writing, "The Boston PD's efforts to capture the Tsarnaev brothers is justly depicted as heroic, but it's the crazed decision-making, the random chains of events, and the empty, angry posturing that stick out as most worthy of analysis. If Berg had dug deeper, he could have had a great film on his hands; as it stands, he's delivered a rote, but occasionally thought-provoking, misfire." Jake Wilson of The Age gave it 2.5/5 stars, writing, "Much of this feels familiar or worse, especially the cringeworthy finale. Yet Berg is a filmmaker of some artistic ambition, and there are occasional intentionally discordant notes – including a menacing electronic score by Trent Reznor and Atticus Ross."

=== Reception from the Boston area ===
Though the film has mostly garnered approval among critics, many Boston-based publications criticized it for glamorizing the events it was based upon, and for the film's focus on Wahlberg's fictional character. In his review for The Boston Globe, Ty Burr wrote: "It's professionally made, slickly heartfelt, and is offered up as an act of civic healing. At best, it's unnecessary. At worst, it's vaguely insulting", and when further referencing local moviegoer's reaction to Wahlberg's heroic but fictional Tommy Saunders character, he simply stated, "We don't really want to see people who weren't there. Especially when they're everywhere". Writing for Esquire, Boston-based critic Luke O'Neil also criticized Wahlberg's character, stating: "For all his talk of honoring his people, Wahlberg seems content to rely on the most hackneyed of Masshole signifiers in their portrayal." Conversely, The Boston Herald gave the film a positive review.

In response, Peter Berg stated that some people automatically disliked the film as they may have been in close proximity to the Boston bombings or they believed the film was made too quickly after the events had occurred. Katharine Q. Seelye, who was not from Boston, wrote in The New York Times that the Saunders character was "[t]he biggest point of divergence", as Boston-area residents disliked the composite character's involvement in all the major events when he was not a single actual person, while people not from the Boston area "may even appreciate [Saunders] as a narrative device" and "have not really questioned" Saunders's role. She concluded "that moviegoers outside New England pretty much accept the film on its own terms, as entertainment, and Bostonians do not."

=== Accolades ===
The National Board of Review honored Mark Wahlberg and Peter Berg with their Spotlight Award for this film (and also for Deepwater Horizon).

== See also ==
- List of films that most frequently use the word fuck
