= Hamilcar Publications =

American publisher

- Parent company: Hannibal Boxing Media LLC
- Founded: 2018
- Country of origin: United States
- Headquarters location: Boston, Massachusetts
- Distribution: Two Rivers Distribution, an Ingram Content Group company
- Key people: Kyle Sarofeen, Publisher; Andy Komack, Managing Director
- Nonfiction topics: Boxing, true crime, hip-hop
- Official website: hamilcarpubs.com

Hamilcar Publications is a Boston-based book publisher and a division of Hannibal Boxing Media LLC. Founded in 2018 by Kyle Sarofeen and Andy Komack, Hamilcar's titles focus on professional boxing, true crime, and hip-hop.
