= Ray Bourque =

Canadian ice hockey player (born 1960)

- Hockey Hall of Fame, 2004
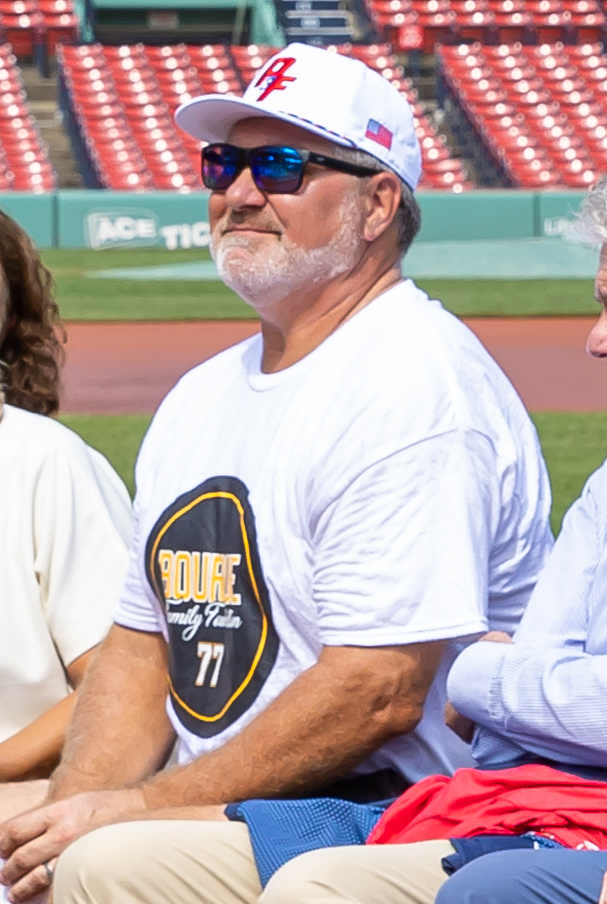
- Bourque at Fenway Park in 2024
- Born: December 28, 1960 (age 65) Saint-Laurent, Quebec, Canada
- Height: 5 ft 11 in (180 cm)
- Weight: 219 lb (99 kg; 15 st 9 lb)
- Position: Defence
- Shot: Left
- Played for: Boston Bruins; Colorado Avalanche
- National team: Canada
- NHL draft: 8th overall, 1979; Boston Bruins
- Playing career: 1979–2001
Medal record
Men's ice hockey
Representing Canada
Canada Cup
Gold medal – first place	1984 Canada
Gold medal – first place	1987 Canada

Raymond Jean Bourque (born December 28, 1960) is a Canadian-American former professional ice hockey player. He holds records for most career goals, assists, and points by a defenceman in the National Hockey League (NHL). He won the James Norris Memorial Trophy as the NHL's best defenceman five times, while finishing second for that trophy a further six times. He also twice finished second in the voting for the Hart Memorial Trophy, a rarity for a defenceman. He was named to the end-of-season All-Star teams 19 times (second only to Gordie Howe's 21 selections), with a record 13 on the first-team and six on the second-team.

Bourque became nearly synonymous with the Boston Bruins franchise, for which he played 21 seasons and became Boston's longest-serving captain. Bourque finished his career with the Colorado Avalanche, with whom he won his only Stanley Cup championship in his final NHL game. He is often considered one of the best offensive defenseman in NHL history, and in 2017, he was named one of the 100 Greatest NHL Players. Following his retirement his #77 was retired by both the Bruins and the Avalanche. Bourque also played with Canada for three Canada Cups and in the 1998 Winter Olympics, the latter being the first time that active NHL players were eligible to participate.

Since his retirement Bourque has been involved in many philanthropic activities in the New England area and also owns an Italian restaurant in Boston.

== Early life ==
Bourque was born in Saint-Laurent, Quebec, the son of Raymond Bourque Sr. and Anita Allain. Both of his parents were originally from New Brunswick, and moved to Montreal in the 1950s. His mother died from cancer when he was 12 years old, while his father died in 2009. Bourque was raised bilingual, speaking both English and French at home, though he went to a French school. He began playing hockey at the age of 5, and dropped out of school at the age of 15 to devote all his time to his junior team, the Verdun Black Hawks.

== Playing career ==
=== Early career ===
Bourque was the third-round pick of the Trois-Rivières Draveurs of the Quebec Major Junior Hockey League (QMJHL; now known as the Quebec Maritimes Junior Hockey League). Halfway through his rookie season, head coach and general manager (GM) Michel Bergeron traded Bourque to Sorel for high-scoring Benoît Gosselin. After a stellar junior career with Sorel and Verdun of the QMJHL, in which he was named the league's best defenceman in 1978 and 1979, Bourque was drafted eighth overall by the Bruins in the 1979 NHL Entry Draft, with a first-round draft choice obtained from the Los Angeles Kings in a 1977 trade for goaltender Ron Grahame. Boston GM Harry Sinden had intended to select defenceman Keith Brown, but Brown was selected by the Chicago Blackhawks immediately prior to Boston's selection. Panicking, the Bruins settled on Bourque, allegedly against their better judgment.

=== Boston Bruins ===
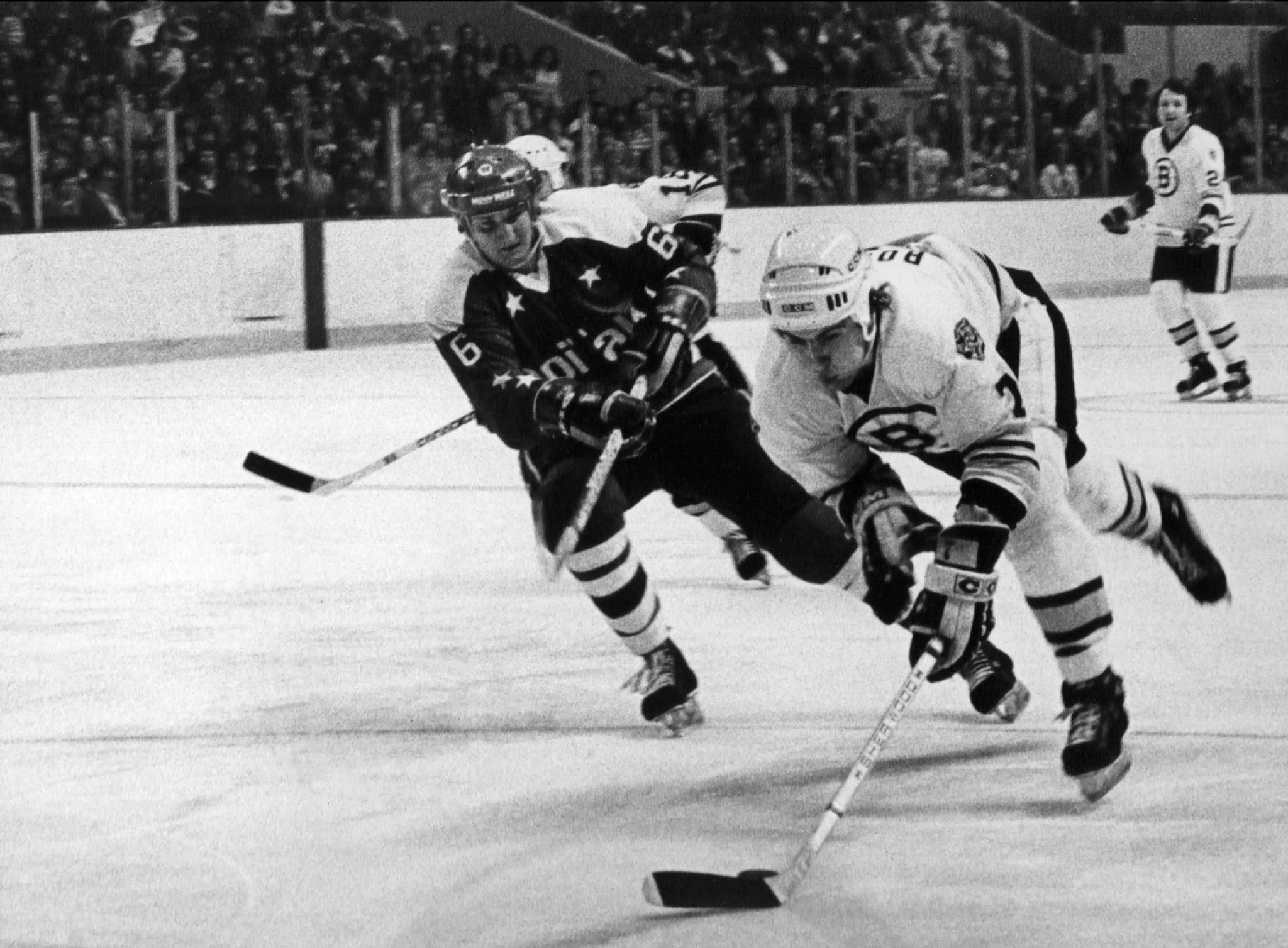
Bourque (wearing #7) being chased by Errol Rausse of the Washington Capitals during his rookie season (1979).

==== Rise to prominence (1979–1985) ====
Bourque made an immediate impact in Boston during his rookie season of 1979–80, scoring a goal in his first game while facing the Winnipeg Jets. Bourque played all 80 games his rookie year scoring 17 goals and 48 assists and quickly asserted himself from the start as one of the best defensemen in the league, winning both the Calder Memorial Trophy as Rookie of the Year and a First Team All-Star selection, the first time in NHL history a rookie non-goaltender had ever achieved the distinction. His 65 points that season was a record at the time for a rookie defenseman. The following year in 1980-81 Bourque missed part of the season with broken jaw, he suffered during a Nov. 11, 1980, game at vs Detroit. He still played in 67 games scoring 27 goals and 29 assists as the Bruins lost in the first round of the playoffs. Despite the injury Bourque was named to the Second Team All-Star at the end of the season.

From here, Bourque continued to shine for the Bruins, proving his rookie season was no fluke. During the offseason Bourque signed a multiyear contract extension with the Bruins on July 15, 1981. The following season quickly established himself as one of the league's top defensemen while also contributing outstanding offensive numbers. Once again in 1981-82 Bourque missed a portion of the season due to a shoulder injury he suffered in October. Following his return he helped lead the team back to the postseason scoring 17 goals and 49 assists while also being named an NHL first team All-Star for a second time. The Bruins beat Buffalo in the first round, however during a second round matchup vs Quebec he fractured his wrist while checking against Andre Dupont resulting in him missing the rest of the series.

During the offseason Bourque suffered more injuries as he re-fractured his wrist while playing a softball game in Montreal however he was able to recover. He then suffered one more injury prior to the 1982-83 season during the team's final preseason game when he was struck by a puck while going to the bench. This resulted in him missing the first month of the season. Following his return the injury led to him wearing a face shield for the first time in his career. During a game vs. the Quebec Nordiques Bourque recorded his first and only hat trick of his career, scoring all 3 goals in the second period in a 11-5 Bruins victory. Despite all the injuries Bourque ended up having his best statistical season up to that point. Scoring 70+ points for the first time in his career with 22 goals and 51 assists. During the postseason Bourque led all defensemen 23 points helping lead the Bruins all way to the conference semifinals where they were defeated by the New York Islanders. Bourque was once again named to a Second Team NHL All-Star.

The 1983–84 season became Bourque's best statistical season, as he scored a career-high 31 goals and 96 points. He led all defensemen in points that season, was named a First Team NHL All-Star and finished 5th in voting for the Hart Memorial Trophy. However the Bruins lost in the opening round of the playoffs. During the 1984-85 season Bourque went 17 consecutive games with a point the 5th longest streak by a defenseman in the history of the NHL. Bourque finished the year with 86 points 10 less than the previous year however he was named an NHL First Team All-Star for a second consecutive year. He also finished runner up to Paul Coffey for the Norris Trophy. The Bruins were once again first round exits in the playoffs. During the offseason Bourque signed a 6-year contract extension with the Bruins worth 2-3 million making him the highest paid defenseman in the league.

==== Captaincy, Stanley Cup appearances and Norris Trophy wins (1985–1996) ====
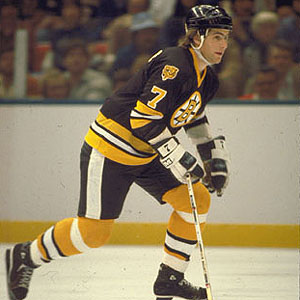
Bourque with the Bruins in 1981

In 1985, upon the retirement of Bruins' captain Terry O'Reilly to coach the club, Bourque and veteran Rick Middleton were named co-captains of the team, Middleton to wear the "C" during home games and Bourque for road games. That season Bourque played 74 games scoring 19 goals and 58 assists he and Bruins once again were first round exits in the playoffs. He also earned his third Second Team NHL All Star Selection.

During the 1986-87 Bourque came one point shy of tying his career best in points scoring 95 (23 goals 72 assists). He led all defensemen in scoring and won his first Norris Trophy as the leagues best defenseman. He also finished as runner up to Wayne Gretzky for the Hart Memorial Trophy. Despite Bourque's terrific season the Bruins lost to Montreal in the first round of the playoffs. He was then named a First NHL Team All-Star for a sixth time.

The following year in 1987-88 Bourque broke Bobby Orr's record for most consecutive games with a point scored by a Bruins defenseman with 19. This is also the second most in NHL history behind Paul Coffey who scored in 28 straight games during the 1985–86 season. Bourque played in 78 games and scoring 17 goals and 64 assists for 81 total points. This resulted in him repeating as the Norris Trophy winner. During the postseason Bourque led all defensive in points with 21 and helped the Bruins reach the 1988 Stanley Cup Finals, in which they were ultimately defeated by the Edmonton Oilers.

Upon Rick Middleton's retirement in 1988, Bourque became the team's sole captain, and retained the position for the remainder of his Bruins' tenure. In so doing, he passed Dit Clapper as the longest-tenured Bruins' captain in history, as well as passing Alex Delvecchio of the Detroit Red Wings as the longest-serving team captain in NHL history, a mark since surpassed by Steve Yzerman of the Red Wings. That season Bourque missed 20 games with sprained ligaments in left knee, which he suffered when he collided with Michel Petit during a game on December 10, 1988, vs. the New York Rangers. Bourque was still selected as an NHL Second Team All-Star scoring 18 goals and 43 assists for 61 points. The Bruins were eliminated in the second round of the playoffs.

During the 1989-90 season Bourque had a career performance during a game on February 18, 1990 vs. Vancouver when he scored 6 points (1 goal and 5 assists) in a Bruins 7-2 victory. played in 76 games scoring 84 points (19 goals and 65) assists. For his efforts he won his third Norris Trophy and finished second to Mark Messier in 1990 in the closest race ever for the Hart Memorial Trophy with Messier winning by two singular votes. Bourque earned another First Team All-Star nod, as he helped lead the Bruins to their first Presidents' Trophy with the leagues best record. He scored 17 points during the playoffs to help the Bruins reach the 1990 Stanley Cup Finals however just like two years prior they were defeated by Edmonton.

During the offseason Bourque signed a four-year contract extension with the Bruins worth 1.1 million a year once again making him the highest paid defenseman in the league. In 1990-91 Bourque had his third 90+ point season scoring 21 goals and tallying a career high 73 assists. In addition he broke Bobby Orr's Bruins record for career points by a defenseman when he scored his 889th point on January 24, 1991. During a game on March 21, vs. the Quebec Nordiques Bourque had an NHL record 19 shots on goal, scoring one in a 3–3 tie. Borque also won back to back Norris Trophy's for the second time in his career marking his fourth total. During the postseason Bourque became Boston's all-time playoff points leader with an assist on April 21, 1991, vs. Montreal. Breaking Phil Esposito's record of 102. However he and the Bruins lost in the conference finals to the eventual Cup champions Pittsburgh Penguins.

Bourque continued to make even more history the following year in 1991-92, broke Bobby Orr's Bruins record for career goals by a defenseman when he scored his 271st goal on January 22, 1992. The following month he scored his 1,000th career point during Boston's February 29, game vs. the Washington Capitals, becoming just the third defenseman in league history to achieve the milestone. He played in all 80 games that year scoring 81 points (21 goals and 61 assists). However he missed the end of the Bruins postseason run due to a broken finger, and the Bruins lost the conference finals to the Penguins who went on to defend their Cup. He also finished runner up to Brian Leetch for the Norris Trophy.

In 1992-93 Bourque yet again set another Bruins record when he broke Johnny Bucyk's career assists record with his 795th assist on March 20, 1993. Following an 82-season (19 goals and 63 assists) Bourque was named a First Team All-Star for the 10th time and once again finished runner up to the Norris Trophy for a second consecutive year, losing to Chris Chelios. He and the Bruins were swept in the first round of the playoffs to the Buffalo Sabres. In 1993-94 Bourque appeared in 72 games and had his fourth and final 90+ points season scoring 20 goals and 71 assists. He missed the last 11 games of the season due to a knee injury. At the end of the year Borque was named the Norris Trophy winner for the fifth and final time of his career. However the Bruins were eliminated in the second round of the playoffs.

During the lock out shortened 1994-95 season he only played 46 games that year and was named a Second Team All-Star after scoring 12 goals and 31 assists. During the postseason he and the Bruins lost in the first round to New Jersey. Bourque the following year in 1995-96 he played in all 80 games and scored 20 goals and 62 assists. He was also named the 1996 National Hockey League All-Star Game MVP after scoring the game-winning goal in front of a hometown crowd at the Fleet Center. That year Bourque finished runner up to Chris Chelios for the Norris once again and the Bruins lost in the first round of the playoffs.

==== Final years (1996–1999) ====
Throughout the 1996-97 campaign Bourque missed 18 games due multiple injuries he sustained throughout the season. During a game on May 27, vs the New York Islanders, Bourque recorded his 1,000th career assist on a goal scored by Jean-Yves Roy. Bourque’s injuries throughout the year resulted in his production declining as he only scored 50 points (19 goals and 31 assists). Despite this Bourque set another record when he scored his 1,340th career point on February 1, 1997 which was a goal vs. Tampa Bay setting the Bruins all-time record for points. During Bourque's tenure with the Bruins, the team appeared a North American professional record twenty-nine consecutive seasons in the playoffs, however that streak ended this year as it was the only time Bourque missed the playoffs as Bruins finished with the NHL's worst record that season. This also marked the first time in his career that he was not named either a first or second team All-Star.

During Bourque's final years with the club his scoring decreased however he still served as a valuable member of the team. As after missing multiple games the previous year Bourque played all 82 games in 1997-98 scoring 13 goals and 35 assists however the Bruins lost in the first round of the playoffs. Borque's final full season with the Bruins came in 1998-99 where he played in 81 games scoring 10 goals and 47 assists. He also broke Johnny Bucyk's record for career games played when he played his 1,437th game on March 13, 1999, at Buffalo.

Despite a nucleus of young talent and high expectations for 1999–2000, injuries caused the Bruins to plummet to the bottom of their division, and they went on track to miss the playoffs. This was further exacerbated by negative attention over teammate Marty McSorley's hit on Donald Brashear. With his career nearing an end and the team going in the wrong direction, Bourque requested a trade from the fading Bruins so he would have a chance to win the Stanley Cup. Bourque initially preferred a team on the East Coast like the Philadelphia Flyers which would be closer to his home in Boston, but general manager Harry Sinden had secretly been working out a deal with the Colorado Avalanche and convinced Bourque that this was the best destination to finish his career. Bourque and fellow veteran Dave Andreychuk were sent to Colorado in exchange for Brian Rolston, Martin Grenier, Samuel Påhlsson and a first-round draft pick (2000 draft, 27th overall, Martin Samuelsson).

Bourque played for Boston for 21 seasons (1979–2000), known for combining offensive prowess with defensive ability. He was a perennial shot accuracy champion at All-Star Games. The Bruins' reliance on Bourque's on-ice mastery was so total that—while Bourque was very durable throughout much of his career with his toughness, consistency, and skill, when he was not on the ice, the team was seen by many to flounder whenever he was out of the lineup. Many consider Bourque to be one of the most notable defensemen in hockey history.

Bourque was also popular among Bruins fans because of his willingness to re-sign with Boston without any acrimonious or lengthy negotiations. He passed over several opportunities to set the benchmark salary for defencemen; instead, he usually quietly and quickly agreed to terms with the Bruins, and this stance irritated the National Hockey League Players' Association (NHLPA), which had been pushing to drive up players' wages.

During his 21 seasons with the Bruins he set many records becoming the all-time career leader in games played (1,518), assists (1,111) and points (1,506).

=== Colorado Avalanche (2000–2001) ===
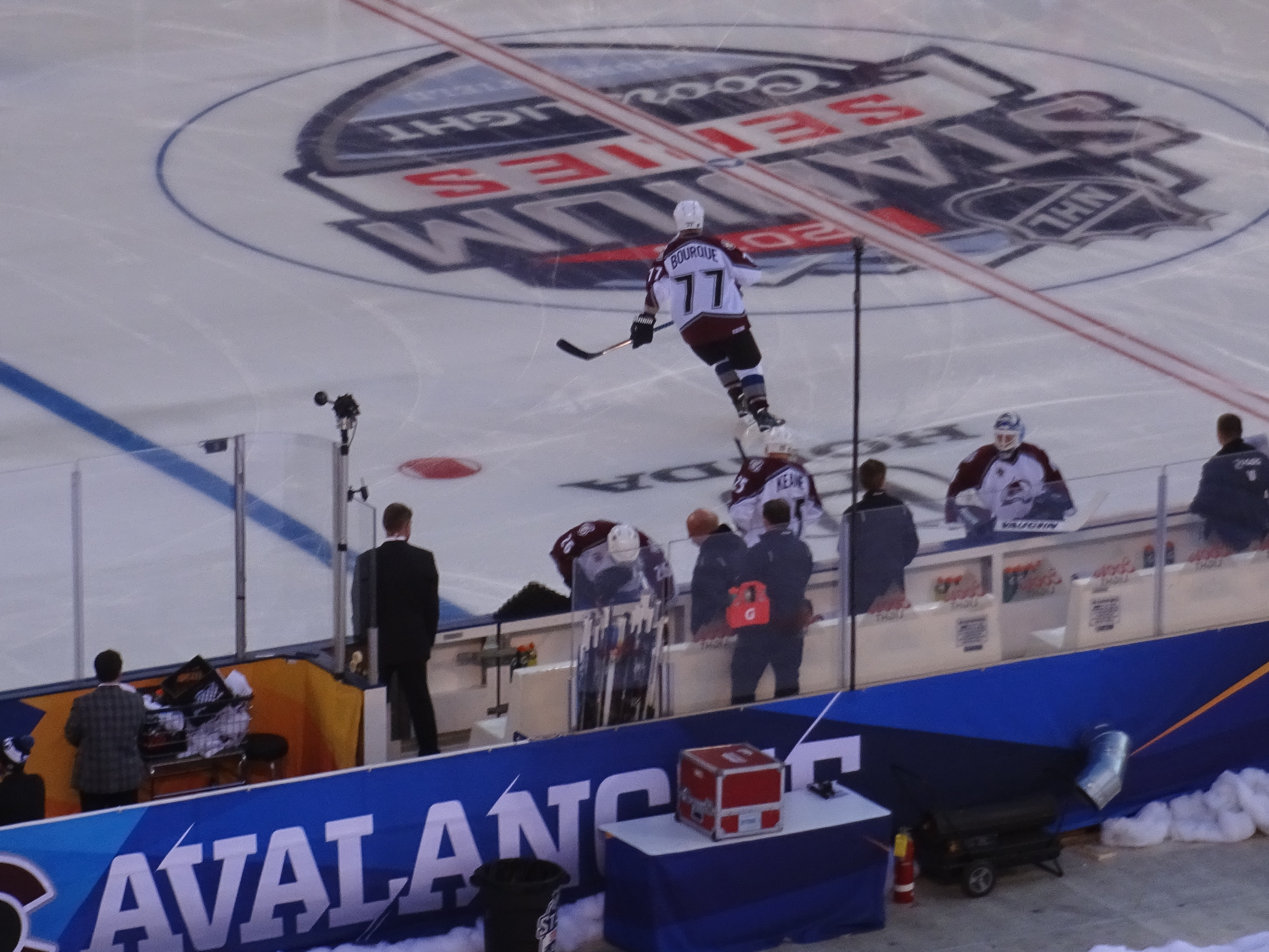
Bourque wore number 77 with Colorado in 2000 and 2001, and again for the Colorado Avalanche alumni in 2016

Bourque was traded from Boston Bruins to the Colorado Avalanche on March 6, 2000. Although Bourque played just one-and-a-half seasons with the Avalanche, he proved to be a force both on the ice and in the locker room. Bourque became teammates with goaltender Patrick Roy, who as a previous member of the Montreal Canadiens had frequent playoff encounters with Bourque's Boston Bruins. In the remainder of the 1999-2000 season, Bourque helped the struggling Avalanche improve their form and capture their division. During the playoffs, they advanced to the conference finals, where they lost to the Dallas Stars in a hard-fought series. Bourque hit the post in the last minutes of Game 7, which would have tied the game after his team rallied from a 3–0 deficit in the third period to 3–2.

Bourque returned to the Avalanche for the 2000–01 season and was named as an alternate captain. He led all Colorado defencemen in scoring with 7 goals and 52 assists in 80 games, and formed a solid defensive pairing with Adam Foote and Rob Blake, the latter of whom the Avs received from the Los Angeles Kings in a trade. Bourque was named to the post-season First All-Star team, finishing as runner-up to the Detroit Red Wings' Nicklas Lidström for the Norris Trophy.

The Avalanche advanced all the way to the Stanley Cup Final, against the defending Cup holders, the New Jersey Devils. Bourque scored the game-winning goal in game three. After the Avalanche lost game five at home which led them trailing the series 3-2, Bourque flew in his relatives for game six in New Jersey, which the Avalanche won 4-0 to even the series. The Avalanche then won game seven at home with a score of 3-1 to capture their second Stanley Cup in franchise history. During the post-game presentation that followed the Avalanche's victory in the decisive seventh game, team captain Joe Sakic broke with tradition and gave the Cup to Bourque so he could skate with it first. Colorado goaltender Patrick Roy, whose fourth championship had come the same day as Bourque's first, said of the Stanley Cup and his teammate, "A name was missing from that [Cup], and today it is back to normal." Bourque had waited longer to win his first Cup than any other Cup-winning player had in the 108-year history of the Stanley Cup, having played 1,612 regular season and 214 playoff games before winning the ultimate prize.

On June 12, 2001, three days after the Cup victory, Bourque brought the Cup back to Boston for an emotional rally attended by some 20,000 fans at Boston's City Hall Plaza. Throughout the Stanley Cup Final, local Massachusetts newspapers covered the series as though the Avalanche were the hometown team, and TV ratings for game seven were higher in Massachusetts everywhere besides Denver. During the event Bourque told the crowd "This [Boston] is home for me and my family. I had some great years with the Bruins, but I'd never come really close to Stanley, my friend," "But to touch this, we felt there was a move that had to be made."

Bourque retired shortly thereafter, having set defensive regular-season records in goals (410) and assists (1169) for 1579 points. During the 2000–01 season, which would be the last for both players, Bourque surpassed Paul Coffey (who had signed as a free agent with the Bruins and was waived in December 2000) to become the all-time leader in goals, assists and points for a defenceman at any senior professional level.

== International play ==
Bourque made his international debut for Team Canada at the 1981 Canada Cup, He scored one goal and four assists in sevem games as Team Canada lost in the final to the Soviet Union. Bourque was then selected for the team once again in 1984 where he recorded four assists in eight games as he and team Canada won the gold medal 6–5 over Sweden. Bourque also participated in the 1987 Canada Cup, where he scored 2 goals and 6 assists as he helped Team Canada win another gold medal. Bourque did not play in the 1991 edition, despite attempts by Wayne Gretzky and Mark Messier to persuade him to take part.

Bourque also played for the NHL All-Stars in Rendez-vous '87 against the Soviet Union.

Bourque played for the Team Canada in the 1998 Winter Olympics, the first edition in which active NHL players were eligible to participate. Controversially, the team captaincy went to Eric Lindros, passing over longer-tenured NHL captains like Bourque, Wayne Gretzky, and Steve Yzerman. Bourque led all defencemen in scoring with one goal and two assists in six games. Canada reached the semi-finals where they were eliminated by the Czech Republic after a 1-1 tie, as Bourque and four of his teammates could not beat Czech goaltender Dominik Hašek in the shootout. Fans and sportscasters have alternatively praised and criticized the decision to have Bourque in the shootout instead of Gretzky; Gretzky was the all-time leading scorer in the NHL but was mediocre on breakaways, while Bourque was a perennial shot accuracy champion at the NHL All-Star skills competition. General manager Bobby Clarke said “As great a player as he was, defencemen don’t get breakaways, so to put him in that position was probably unfair. It was a poor decision in my opinion not to use Gretzky and to put Raymond in that position.” A demoralized Team Canada then lost the bronze medal match to Finland 3-2 and went home empty-handed.

== Playing style/legacy ==
Throughout his career Bourque was a prominent player, recognized for his defensive instincts. Specializing in reading plays, using positioning rather than physical play, and his balance enabled him to keep possession under physical pressure. Bourque's skating ability was characterized by speed, agility and lateral movement. This allowed him to transition between defense to leading a counterattack.

Bourque was also known for his offensive prowess as a puck-moving defenseman. He initiated offense with smooth breakout passes and often joined the attack, almost acting as a 4th forward. His vision and passing were both key components of his playmaking prowess. Besides his play making he is also known as one of the best scoring defensemen in NHL history, scoring 20 or more goals 9 times throughout his career. In total he scored 10 or more goals in every season until his final year. Bourque also excelled on the power play, scoring 173 career goals on the unit, as well as setting a record for defensemen with 60 game-winning goals. In 2000, he became the all-time scoring leader among NHL defensemen, when he reached 1,520 points. He ended his NHL career with 1,579 points in 1,612 regular-season games and 180 points in 214 playoff games. He has the most points for a player with under 500 goals in NHL history. This has resulted in him being widely regarded as one of the greatest offensive defensemen in NHL history.

Bourque also possessed a powerful yet accurate wrist shot, which has been described one of the best among all players. He showed how good his shooting ability was during NHL All Star shooting competition winning the event 8 times throughout his career.

He was one of the most consistent players of his era, being voted one of the top defenseman throughout his entire career. Even as he entered the twilight of his career he adapted his style to continue his effectiveness, his former teammate Patrick Roy once commented on Bourque stating “ He’s like a bear out there,” in comparison to Bourque's pride and work ethic.

Bourque was also known for his leadership abilities as well as his sportsmanship. Once being described as “a symbol of class, hard work, determination, and above all, a leader” who "never put himself ahead of the team."

During his 21 seasons with the Boston Bruins Bourque became one of the best player in team history and set many records becoming their all-time career leader in games played (1,518), assists (1,111) and points (1,506). His 13 First NHL All Star Team selections are the most in NHL history and six Second Team All-Star squads, second in total in league history only behind Gordie Howe and most amongst defencemen.

Even with Bourque's career overlapping other great defensemen, such as Paul Coffey, Chris Chelios, Denis Potvin, Al MacInnis, Brian Leetch, and Scott Stevens he still remained the gold standard of his era. Bourque's former coach Brian Sutter once stated "Al, Pronger, Potvin, those other guys … all great players," "And I mean great players. But Raymond was a notch above them, above everybody. In my opinion, he was the greatest defenseman since the greatest-ever defenseman, Bobby Orr.”

He is often regarded as not just one of the best defensemen in NHL history, but as one of the all-around greatest players. in 1998 he was voted the 14th greatest hockey player of all time in The Hockey News' list of 100 greatest NHL players. In 2023 he was named the 10th greatest hockey player of all time by The Athletic.

== Jersey number ==
For a majority of his NHL career, Bourque wore jersey number 77. After he retired following the 2000–01 season, both the Bruins and the Avalanche honored him by retiring number 77.

When he was initially called up to the Bruins, Bourque was assigned the number 7, which had been worn by former Bruins star forward Phil Esposito from the time he was acquired by the team in 1967 until he departed in 1976 via trade. Bourque was the third player to be issued the number following Esposito's departure, following Sean Shanahan and Bill Bennett.

In 1987, six years after Esposito's retirement, and three years after he was elected to the Hockey Hall of Fame, the Bruins decided to retire number 7 in his honor. Bourque, thus, would be the last Bruin to wear number 7 and was permitted to do so as long as he desired to even after Esposito's retirement ceremony, which was scheduled for December 3 of that year. Bourque, however, came up with his own way to honor the veteran Bruin and did so at the ceremony.

As the Bruins were dressing for that night's game, Bourque put on two jerseys with his normal number 7 as the top layer. When the team came out for the retirement ceremony, Bourque skated over to Esposito just before he was about to speak to the Boston crowd. He removed his number 7 jersey and handed it to Esposito, a move that was seen as "surrendering" the number to him. In doing this, Bourque also revealed his new number to the crowd, as the jersey he had been wearing underneath his number 7 bore the number 77 he would wear for the remainder of his career.

== Personal life and retirement ==
Bourque married his high school sweetheart Christiane in 1982, the couple live in Massachusetts, and have two sons, Christopher and Ryan and a daughter, Melissa. Christopher and Ryan both became professional hockey players. Bourque's younger brother Richard was also a hockey player and was drafted by the Bruins in the 1981 NHL Entry Draft in the tenth round, but never played professional hockey.

Bourque was named a Bruins team consultant on November 3, 2005.

While Bourque's children were attending Cushing Academy he served as an assistant coach for the hockey team from 2002 to 2007.

Bourque is the co-owner of an Italian restaurant called Tresca located in Boston's North End. The restaurant was opened in 2005; he owns it alongside executive chef Rich Ansara. In 2016 lower portion of the restaurant was converted into a bar arena and was renamed Cafe 77 in reference to Bourque's jersey number. Bourque wanted to open the restaurant due to his love for the North End because of the Italian food, culture and heritage that he developed during his playing days in Boston.

Bourque was involved with charitable events throughout most of his career and helped create contributions totaling more than $20 million to over 1,000 different charities. In 2017 he and his wife decided then decided to start their own charity called the Bourque Family Foundation. The foundation supports charitable events around the Boston and New England area from establishing after school programs to famine relief efforts. The charity is a family oriented Bourque stated "With the Bourque Family Foundation, my wife and I wanted to create something where we could get the kids — and grandkids — involved." The foundation holds multiple annual events including the 7.7K road race in the spring, Bourques celebrity Golf tournament in summer and the Captain's Ball in honor of Pete Frates which takes place in September and the proceeds of the event go directly to ALS research. Since its inception the charity has donated over $1.5 million to over 50 different charities. In his spare time Bourque also makes numerous one-off appearances at other charity events / galas to raise funds for multiple organizations. He is also a member of the Boston Bruins alumni association and has occasionally completed charity benefit games.

He is also an avid golfer and is a member of the Salem Country Club, in 2017 Bourque served as the Honorary Chairman of U.S. Senior Open Golf Championship in Peabody Massachusetts.

In March 2023 it was announced Bourque would be the head coach of Bostons 3ICE team and his two sons would be playing for the team as well. Bourque coached the team to the playoffs with a 4–2 record but lost in the semifinals. Bourque returned as the coach for the 2025 season but missed the playoffs going 1–3.

In 2025 he launched Bourque's Brew, a lager developed in partnership with Jack's Abby Craft Lagers and Legal Sea Foods, with a portion of every can sold benefiting Bourque's charity.

== Honors ==
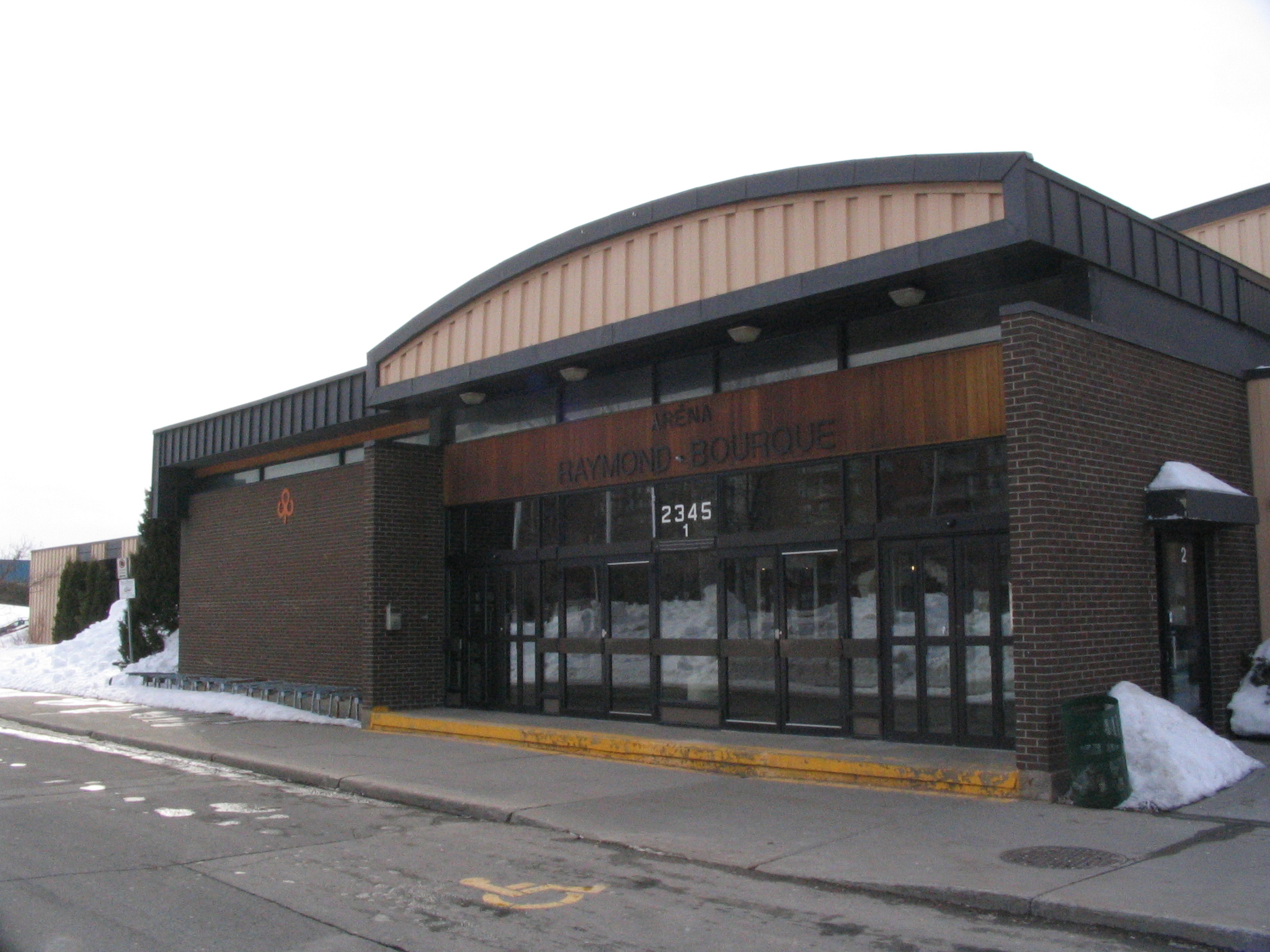
The Aréna Raymond-Bourque in Saint-Laurent, QC

During his time with the Boston Bruins Bourque received the King Clancy Memorial Trophy, for his Involvement with numerous charities; most notably he served as the chairman for Boston's Floating Hospital for Infants and Children.

On October 4, 2001, the Bruins held Ray Bourque night, where they retired his number 77 jersey, receiving a standing ovation from the sold out crowd. Then on November 24, 2001, the Avalanche also retired his number 77 jersey.

In 2003 Bourque was awarded the Lester Patrick Trophy for his outstanding service to hockey in the United States.

Bourque was inducted into the Hockey Hall of Fame in 2004, his first season of eligibility. His uniform number 77 has been retired by both the Bruins and the Avalanche; he is one of only nine players whose jersey has been retired by more than one club. His birthplace of Saint-Laurent named the "Aréna Raymond-Bourque" in his honour. He was also inducted into the Quebec Sports Hall of Fame in 2004.

In 2011 he was inducted into the Canada Sports Hall of Fame.

On July 29, 2014 Endicott college held a groundbreaking ceremony unveiling their new hockey rink Raymond J. Bourque Arena. While Bourque did not have any formal connection to the school at the time, he is a 30-year resident of the North Shore and has contributed to the local community inspiring them to name the arena after him. On May 16, 2015, Bourque served as the commencement speaker for the college and was also a recipient of an Honorary Doctor of Humane Letters.

In January 2017, he was part of the first group of players to be named one of the '100 Greatest NHL Players' in history by the National Hockey League.

In 2019, Bourque received the NHL Alumni's Keith Magnuson Man of the Year Award in recognition of his charitable efforts, having raised over 20 million dollars in support of more than 1,000 different charities.

In 2024 he was honored during the Bruins centennial celebrations being Named to the Boston Bruins All-Centennial Team.

== Awards and achievements ==
Bourque's exceptional talent as a player has led him to become one of the most honored players in hockey history. During his career, he was selected to thirteen NHL First Team (the most in history) and six Second Team All-Star squads, second in total in league history only to Gordie Howe and most amongst defencemen. He won the Norris Trophy as the top defenceman in the league five times, fourth all-time after Bobby Orr, Doug Harvey and Nicklas Lidström. Among his numerous other records and honors are the following:

=== Career ===
- 11th all-time (4th among defencemen) in career games played with 1,612.
- 4th all-time in career assists with 1,169; a record for defencemen.
- 11th all-time in career points scored (1,579).
- 1st in career points scored by a defenceman (1,579).
- 1st in career goals scored by a defenceman (410).
- Career leader in shots on goal by a defenceman (6,206).
- Is third in career plus-minus with 528, behind Larry Robinson and Orr.
- Bruins' all-time career leader in games played (1,518), assists (1,111) and points (1,506), also ranking fourth in goals and first in assists with a single team (any position).
- 3rd all-time in playoff assists and 10th all-time in playoff points.
- In 1998, three years before the end of his career, he was ranked number 14 on The Hockey News' list of the one hundred greatest hockey players of all time. He was the highest-ranking player who had not yet won a Stanley Cup, the next highest being No. 38-ranked Marcel Dionne.
- In 2017, he was named one of the 100 Greatest NHL Players.
- Named One of the Top 100 Best Bruins Players of all Time.
- Named to the Boston Bruins All-Centennial Team.

=== NHL records ===
- Holds the NHL record for most shots on goal in one game with 19 (Mar. 21, 1991)

=== Trophies and leaders ===
- Won the Calder Memorial Trophy in 1980
- Won the Norris Trophy in 1987, 1988, 1990, 1991 and 1994
- Won the King Clancy Memorial Trophy in 1992
- Received the Lester Patrick Trophy in 2003
- Stanley Cup champion in 2001
- Led the NHL in shots in 1984, 1987 and 1995

=== NHL All-Star teams ===
- NHL first team All-Star in 1980, 1982, 1984, 1985, 1987, 1988, 1990, 1991, 1992, 1993, 1994, 1996, and 2001.
- Second Team All-Star in 1981, 1983, 1986, 1989, 1995 and 1999.

=== NHL All-Star Game ===
- Named to play in the All-Star Game for the 19th consecutive season, 2001; Bourque also appeared in the All-Star Game in every season that it was held during his career (there was no game in 1987 or 1995).
- Most Valuable Player of the All-Star Game in 1996.
- Won the NHL All-star Game Shooting Accuracy Competition in 1990, 1992, 1993, 1997, 1998, 1999, 2000, and 2001.

=== Boston Bruins ===
- Elizabeth C. Dufresne Trophy winner in 1980, 1985, 1986, 1987, 1990 1994 and 1996.
- Seventh Player Award winner in 1980
- Bruins Three Stars Awards winner in 1980, 1981, 1982, 1983, 1984, 1985, 1986, 1987, 1988, 1989, 1990, 1991, 1992, 1993, 1994, 1995, 1996, 1997, 1998 and 1999.
- His #77 jersey number was retired by the Boston Bruins on October 4, 2001.

=== QMJHL ===
- First team All Star in 1978 and 1979
- Emile Bouchard Trophy In 1979
- Frank J. Selke Memorial Trophy in 1979
- QMJHL Hall of Fame Class of 2002

== Career statistics ==
=== Regular season and playoffs ===
			Regular season					Playoffs
Season	Team	League	GP	G	A	Pts	PIM	GP	G	A	Pts	PIM
1976–77	Trois-Rivières Draveurs	QMJHL	39	3	20	23	27	—	—	—	—	—
1976–77	Sorel Black Hawks	QMJHL	30	9	16	25	29	—	—	—	—	—
1977–78	Verdun Black Hawks	QMJHL	72	22	57	79	90	4	2	1	3	0
1978–79	Verdun Black Hawks	QMJHL	63	22	71	93	44	11	3	16	19	18
1979–80	Boston Bruins	NHL	80	17	48	65	73	10	2	9	11	2
1980–81	Boston Bruins	NHL	67	27	29	56	96	3	0	1	1	2
1981–82	Boston Bruins	NHL	65	17	49	66	5	9	1	5	6	16
1982–83	Boston Bruins	NHL	65	22	51	73	20	17	8	15	23	10
1983–84	Boston Bruins	NHL	78	31	65	96	57	3	0	2	2	0
1984–85	Boston Bruins	NHL	73	20	66	86	53	5	0	3	3	4
1985–86	Boston Bruins	NHL	74	19	58	77	6	3	0	0	0	0
1986–87	Boston Bruins	NHL	78	23	72	95	36	4	1	2	3	0
1987–88	Boston Bruins	NHL	78	17	64	81	7	23	3	18	21	26
1988–89	Boston Bruins	NHL	60	18	43	61	52	10	0	4	4	6
1989–90	Boston Bruins	NHL	76	19	65	84	50	17	5	12	17	16
1990–91	Boston Bruins	NHL	76	21	73	94	75	19	7	18	25	12
1991–92	Boston Bruins	NHL	80	21	60	81	56	12	3	6	9	12
1992–93	Boston Bruins	NHL	78	19	63	82	40	4	1	0	1	2
1993–94	Boston Bruins	NHL	72	20	71	91	58	13	2	8	10	0
1994–95	Boston Bruins	NHL	46	12	31	43	20	5	0	3	3	0
1995–96	Boston Bruins	NHL	80	20	62	82	58	5	1	6	7	2
1996–97	Boston Bruins	NHL	62	19	31	50	18	—	—	—	—	—
1997–98	Boston Bruins	NHL	82	13	35	48	80	6	1	4	5	2
1998–99	Boston Bruins	NHL	81	10	47	57	34	12	1	9	10	14
1999–00	Boston Bruins	NHL	65	10	28	38	20	—	—	—	—	—
1999–00	Colorado Avalanche	NHL	14	8	6	14	6	13	1	8	9	8
2000–01	Colorado Avalanche	NHL	80	7	52	59	48	21	4	6	10	12
NHL totals			1,612	410	1,169	1,579	1,141	214	41	139	180	171

=== International ===
Year	Team	Event	GP	G	A	Pts	PIM
1981	Canada	CC	7	1	4	5	6
1984	Canada	CC	8	0	4	4	8
1987	Canada	CC	9	2	6	8	10
1998	Canada	OLY	6	1	2	3	4
Senior totals			30	5	15	20	28

== See also ==
- List of NHL statistical leaders
- Notable families in the NHL
- List of NHL career assists leaders
- List of NHL players with 1,000 games played

Preceded by Al Secord	Boston Bruins first-round draft pick 1979	Succeeded by Brad McCrimmon
Preceded by Terry O'Reilly	Boston Bruins captain 1985–2000; With: Rick Middleton (1985–1988)	Succeeded by Jason Allison
Preceded by Paul Coffey; Chris Chelios; Chris Chelios	Winner of the Norris Trophy; 1987, 1988; 1990, 1991; 1994	Succeeded by Chris Chelios; Brian Leetch; Paul Coffey
Preceded by Dave Taylor	Winner of the King Clancy Memorial Trophy; 1992	Succeeded by Dave Poulin
Preceded by Bobby Smith	Winner of the Calder Memorial Trophy; 1980	Succeeded by Peter Šťastný
