= Anita Verma-Lallian =

American real estate developer

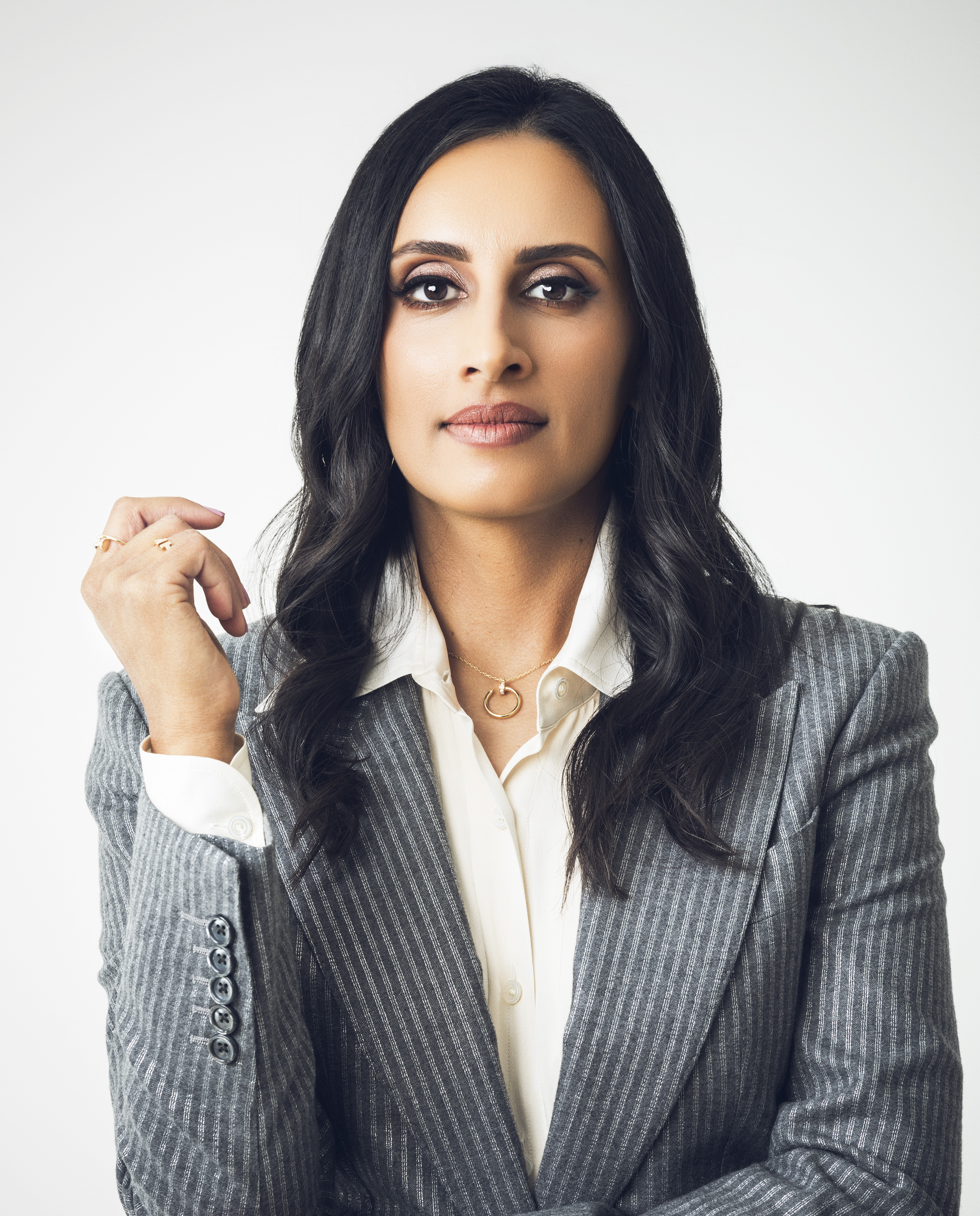
- Education: BS in Business Administration, University of Arizona; MBA, University of Southern California
- Occupations: Real estate developer, film producer
- Website: https://arizonalandconsulting.com/

Anita Verma-Lallian is a real estate developer, film producer and the founder of Arizona Land Consulting based in Scottsdale, Arizona.

== Biography ==
Verma-Lallian graduated from the University of Arizona in 2004 with a BS in Business Administration and received her MBA from the University of Southern California in 2007.

Verma-Lallian started her career at her father’s company, Vermaland. In 2020, Verma-Lallian founded Arizona Land Consulting, a company best known for its real estate deals involving the construction of AI data centers.

In 2023, she founded a film production company, Camelback Productions.
