= Casey Sherman =

American author

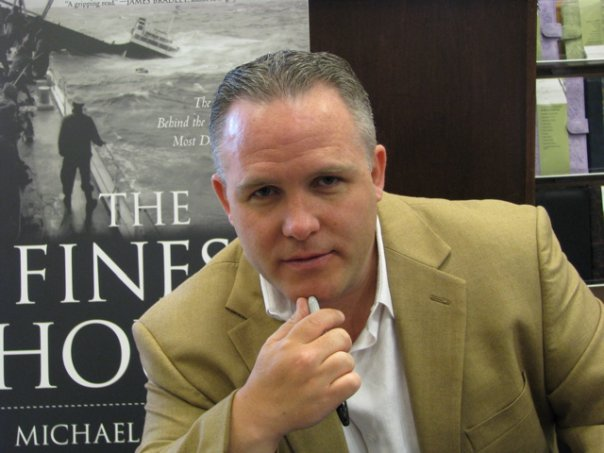
- Sherman in 2010
- Born: January 19, 1969 (age 57); Hyannis, Massachusetts, United States
- Occupations: Novelist; journalist; screenwriter
- Spouse: Kristin Sherman
- Children: Isabella Sherman, Mia Sherman
- Parent(s): Donald Sherman, Diane Sherman
- Relatives: Mary Sullivan (aunt), Todd Sherman (brother)

Casey Sherman is an American author, journalist and screenwriter most famous for his 2009 book The Finest Hours, which was adapted into the Disney Studios 2016 film of the same name, and Boston Strong, which was adapted into the 2016 film Patriots Day and also for co-creating and starring in the NBC Peacock documentary, The Boston Strangler: Unheard Confession., and serving as Executive Producer for Hunting Whitey Bulger, a docuseries for Hulu narrated by Ben Affleck.

== Biography ==
Sherman was born in Hyannis, Massachusetts. He attended Barnstable High School and graduated from Fryeburg Academy in 1988. He studied at Boston University, graduating in 1992.

=== Producer and author career ===
As a television news producer for WBZ-TV, Sherman led a high-profile re-investigation of his aunt's murder, which he later chronicled in his 2003 book, A Rose for Mary: The Hunt for the Real Boston Strangler. Sherman's work suggests that his aunt, 19-year old Mary Sullivan, might not have been a victim of the Boston Strangler, as commonly believed. Sherman wrote the modern day maritime classic and The New York Times Best-seller The Finest Hours in 2009, co-authored with Michael J. Tougias. The book was developed into the 2016 motion picture of the same name. It was filmed in Quincy, Massachusetts, and Chatham, Massachusetts, for Walt Disney Pictures. The Craig Gillespie-directed film stars Chris Pine, Casey Affleck, and Eric Bana. Sherman's other books include Bad Blood, Black Irish, Black Dragon, and Boston Strong: A City's Triumph Over Tragedy. The latter, about the city's response to the Boston Marathon bombing, was adapted as a feature dramatic film, Patriots Day (2016), starring Mark Wahlberg, Nina Dobrev, Jake Picking, Candice King, Alyssa Diaz, Kat Graham, James Harvey Ward, Stephen Amell, Paul Wesley and Alex Mckenna directed by Peter Berg.

Sherman also co-wrote The Ice Bucket Challenge: Pete Frates and the Fight against ALS and the New York Times Best-seller 12: The Inside Story of Tom Brady's Fight for Redemption with Dave Wedge . Both books are now in development as major motion pictures, as is Sherman's 2013 true crime drama, Animal: The Bloody Rise and Fall of the Mob's Most Feared Assassin with 20th Century FOX In 2018, Sherman reunited with Michael J. Tougias to write the Cold War drama Above & Beyond: John F. Kennedy and America's Most Dangerous Cold War Spy Mission.

In 2020, Sherman co-wrote the true-crime thriller,Hunting Whitey: The Inside Story of Capture & Killing of America's Most Wanted Crime Boss with Dave Wedge and partnered with James Patterson to write The New York Times Best-seller, The Last Days of John Lennon with Dave Wedge.

In 2020, Sherman worked as a featured weekly columnist for the Boston Herald.

In 2022, Sherman wrote the best-selling true crime thriller, Helltown: The Untold Story of A Serial Killer on Cape Cod, chronicling the Tony Costa murders. Helltown is now in development for a limited television series with Amazon Studio starring Oscar Isaac and directed by Edward Berger.

In 2023, Sherman became the founding true crime chair for the Hamptons Whodunit Book Festival . Sherman has also been a featured speaker and panelist at the Nantucket Book Festival , Boston Book Festival, the Mississippi Book Festival and Tucson Festival of Books.

In 2023, Sherman served as a writer for the YouTube television series, From Malta to Yalta.

In 2024, Sherman published his 18th thriller, A Murder in Hollywood: The Untold Story of Tinseltown's Most Shocking Crime, which became a USA Today best-seller and a Los Angeles Times best-seller. The book re-examined the story of Lana Turner and the death of her gangster boyfriend, Johnny Stompanato. Sherman's book received a nomination for the 2024 Clue Award's Book of the Year.

In 2025, Sherman published, Blood in the Water, a true crime thriller that chronicled the infamous Nathan Carman case. Publishers Weekly called the book, "a riveting true crime tale and a chilling examination of money's corrosive power." Blood in the Water was featured in a 2025 episode of ABC's 20/20.

In 2025, Sherman wrote & produced a true crime stage play titled, A NightMARE with Casey Sherman, which premiered at Boston's historic Wilbur Theatre.

In 2025, Sherman was inducted into Fryeburg Academy's Hall of Excellence.

In 2025, Sherman starred in The Boston Strangler: Unheard Confession on Oxygen & NBC Peacock, which chronicled his work on the Boston Strangler case.

In 2026, it was announced that Sherman would serve as Executive Producer for Hunting Whitey Bulger, a docuseries for Hulu narrated by and co-produced by Oscar winner Ben Affleck.

In 2026, Sherman published, The Killer and Frank Lloyd Wright: The True Story of Mass Murder in Paradise. The true crime thriller chronicles the deadly fire and murders of Wright's soulmate Martha Borthwick and her two young children at Taliesen. In its review, Publishers Weekly said, "Sherman exhibits both a novelist’s sense of pace and a reporter’s eye for detail in this arresting true crime narrative of great passion and great tragedy. It’s a heartbreaker."

In 2026, Sherman adapted his book Helltown into a true crime stage play, which will premiere in 2027.

Sherman is represented by the United Talent Agency in Los Angeles. He has appeared as a guest analyst on CNN, Fox News, NBC's Today Show, Discovery, History, Travel Channel, Dateline NBC, CBS Evening News, ABC World News Tonight, and others. Sherman is a contributing writer for The Washington Post, Esquire, Fox News, Boston Magazine, Boston Common, The Huffington Post and worked as a weekly featured columnist for The Boston Herald.

=== Whydah Gally ===
Sherman is also a member of the Whydah Gally investigative team. In 2018, Sherman led an expedition to Devon, England, to locate a blood relative of pirate captain Samuel Bellamy and obtain their DNA for comparison to a human bone discovered in the shipwreck by Barry Clifford. The bone was examined by forensic scientists at the University of New Haven and deemed not a match. The sample of Bellamy's DNA has been preserved for future analysis of at least six new skeletal remains recently found in the shipwreck.

== Awards ==
- Emmy Award (nominated)
- 2010 Truth & Justice Award
- 2010 Massachusetts Book of the Year finalist (for The Finest Hours)
- 2010 New Hampshire Literary Prize finalist (for "Bad Blood")
- 2014 Junior Library Guild selection (for "The Finest Hours")
- 2016 Imaginnaire Award (Imagine Magazine)
- 2018 Massachusetts Book of the Year finalist (for Above & Beyond)
- 2020 Amazon Editor's Pick (for The Last Days of John Lennon)
- 2022 Amazon Editor's Pick (for Helltown)
- 2024 Clue Awards Finalist for Book of the Year (for A Murder in Hollywood)

== Works ==
=== Novels ===
- Black Irish (2007)
- Black Dragon (2008)

=== Non-fiction ===
==== Articles ====
- "The Way Back" (2014, with Dave Wedge), in Esquire
- "President Trump Needs to Learn Something about Diplomacy - and Fast" (2018) in The Washington Post
- "Rocky Road"(2018) in Boston
- "Blood in the Water" (2019) in Boston
- "Cape Fear" (2020) in Boston
- "In the Dark" (2021) in Boston
- "Loss, Love, and the Hermit Who Went Viral (2022) in Boston

==== Biographies ====
- The Ice Bucket Challenge: Pete Frates and the Fight against ALS (2017, with Dave Wedge)
- The Last Days of John Lennon (2020, with James Patterson and Dave Wedge)

==== True events ====
- A Rose for Mary: The Hunt for the Real Boston Strangler (2003)
- Search for the Strangler: My Hunt for Boston's Most Notorious Killer (2005)
- The Finest Hours: The True Story of the U.S. Coast Guard's Most Daring Sea Rescue (2009, with Michael J. Tougias)
  Young Readers Edition: The Finest Hours (2014)
- Bad Blood: Freedom and Death in the White Mountains (2009)
- Animal: The Bloody Rise and Fall of the Mob's Most Feared Assassin (2013)
- Boston Strong (book)|Boston Strong: A City's Triumph over Tragedy (2015, with Dave Wedge)
- 12: The Inside Story of Tom Brady's Fight for Redemption (2018, with Dave Wedge)
- Hunting Whitey: The Inside Story of the Capture & Killing of America's Most Wanted Crime Boss (2020, with Dave Wedge)
- Helltown: The Untold Story of a Serial Killer on Cape Cod (2022)
- A Murder in Hollywood: The Untold Story of Tinseltown's Most Shocking Crime (2024)
- Blood in the Water: The Untold Story of a Family Tragedy (2025)
- The Killer and Frank Lloyd Wright: The True Story of Mass Murder in Paradise (2026)

==== History ====
- Above & Beyond: John F. Kennedy and America's Most Dangerous Cold War Spy Mission (2018, with Michael J. Tougias)

== Adaptations ==
- The Finest Hours (2016), a film directed by Craig Gillespie, based on the non-fiction book The Finest Hours: The True Story of the U.S. Coast Guard's Most Daring Sea Rescue
- Patriots Day (2016), a film directed by Peter Berg, based on the non-fiction book Boston Strong
- Hunting Whitey (2023), starring Neal McDonough, based on the non-fiction book Hunting Whitey: The Inside Story of the Capture & Killing of America's Most Wanted Crime Boss
- The Boston Strangler: Unheard Confessions (2025), an NBC Peacock documentary, based on Sherman's investigation of the Boston Strangler case
- Hunting Whitey Bulger (2026), a Hulu docuseries narrated by Oscar winner Ben Affleck
