= Tara Grammy =

Iranian-Canadian actress and playwright

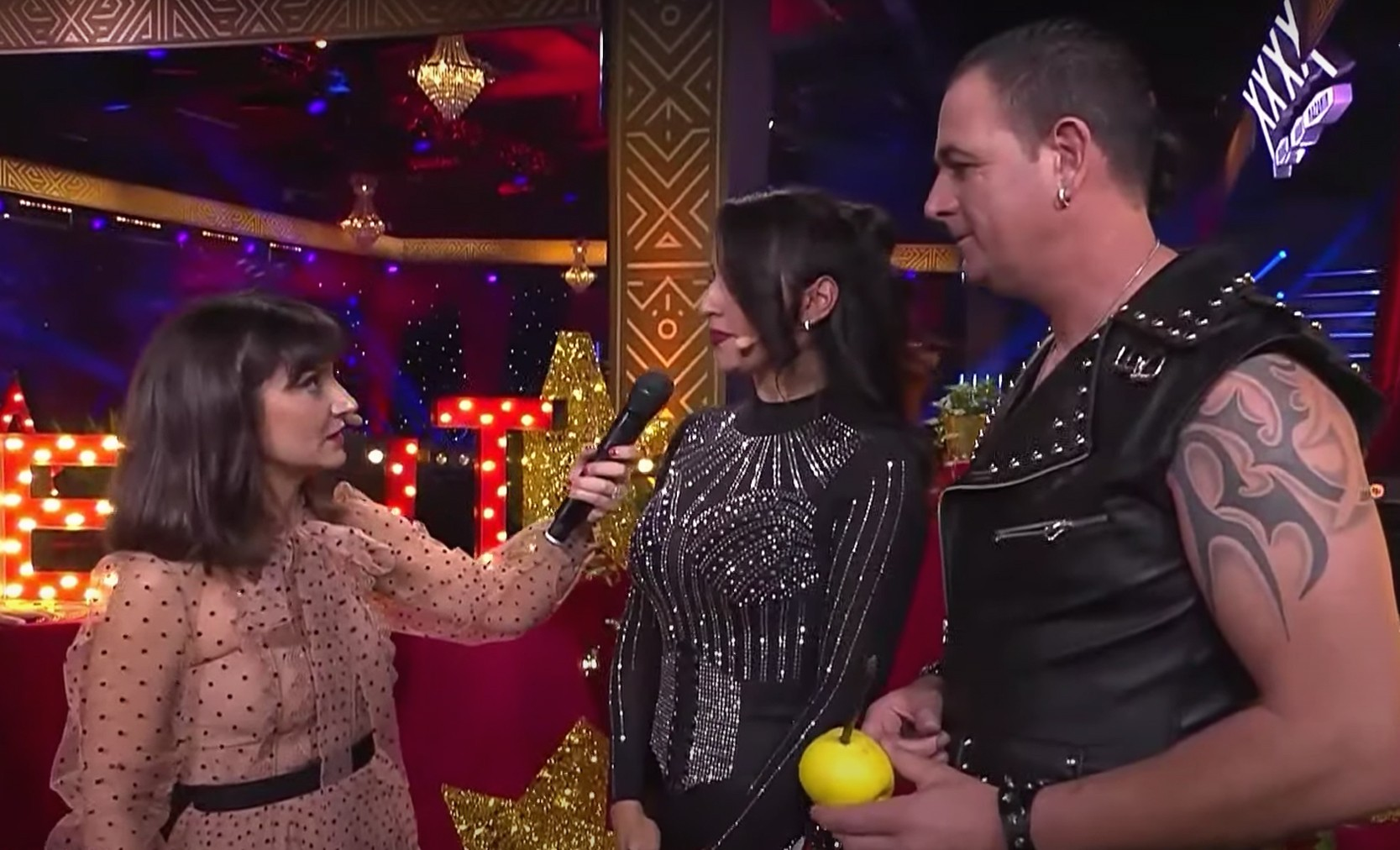
- Born: Tehran, Iran
- Occupations: Actor, writer
- Years active: 2011–present

Tara Grammy (Persian: تارا گرامی, romanized: Tārā Gerāmī) is an Iranian-Canadian actress and playwright.

== Life and career ==
Grammy was born in Tehran, Iran, but grew up in Toronto, Canada. She co-wrote Mahmoud, a play that was a finalist for the Governor General's Award for English-language drama at the 2015 Governor General's Awards. Grammy played "Nousha" in the 2020 romantic comedy A Simple Wedding, with award-winning actresses Shohreh Aghdashloo and Rita Wilson. She co-wrote, produced and starred in The Persian Bachelorette, a comedic sketch that was viewed over 150,000 times in a few days on YouTube.

She is a host on the first season of Persia's Got Talent, a Persian spin-off of the British talent show Got Talent, which was produced in Sweden.
