= 52-foot Motor Lifeboat =

Boat used by the U.S. Coast Guard

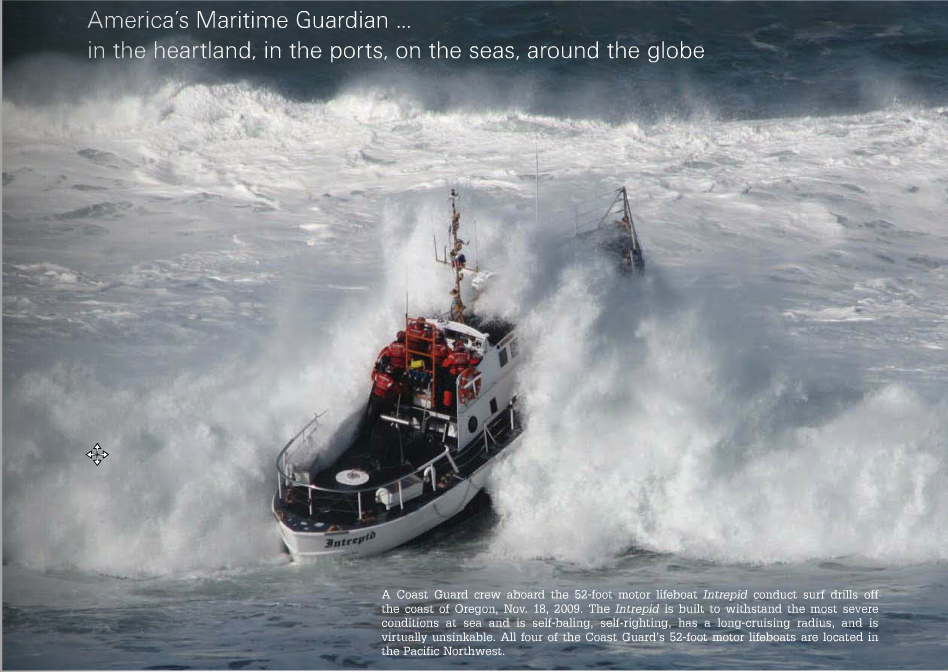
- The United States Coast Guard operates four 52 foot motor lifeboats in the Pacific Northwest.

Class overview
- Name: 52' MLB
- Preceded by: 52' MLB (Type F)
- Cost: US$236,000 (1962) (equivalent to US$1.92 million in 2025)
- Built: 1956–1961
- In service: 1956–2021
- Completed: 4

General characteristics
- Displacement: 32 tons
- Length: 52 feet (16 m)
- Beam: 14 feet 7 inches (4.45 m)
- Draught: 6 feet 11 inches (2.11 m)
- Propulsion: 2×GM 6-71, 170 hp (130 kW)
- Speed: 11 knots
- Range: 495 nautical miles (917 km)
- Capacity: 35 survivors + crew
- Complement: 5
- Sensors & processing systems: Navigational radar

The United States Coast Guard operated four 52-foot Motor Lifeboats (MLBs), also known as "special purpose craft — heavy weather" (SPC-HWX), from 1956 until 2021. The 52' MLBs supplemented its fleet of 227 47-foot Motor Lifeboats. These motor lifeboats were built in the late 1950s and early 1960s, and each displaces 32 tons.

The four vessels were all stationed within the Graveyard of the Pacific in the Pacific Northwest. The vessels are remembered for the many lives they saved over 60 years of service in brutal ocean conditions. They were withdrawn from service in 2021 and laid up due to the difficulty of maintenance; procurement started in 2024 for their planned replacements (SPC-HWX II), which according to preliminary designs will be 64 feet long, overall.

== Design and history ==
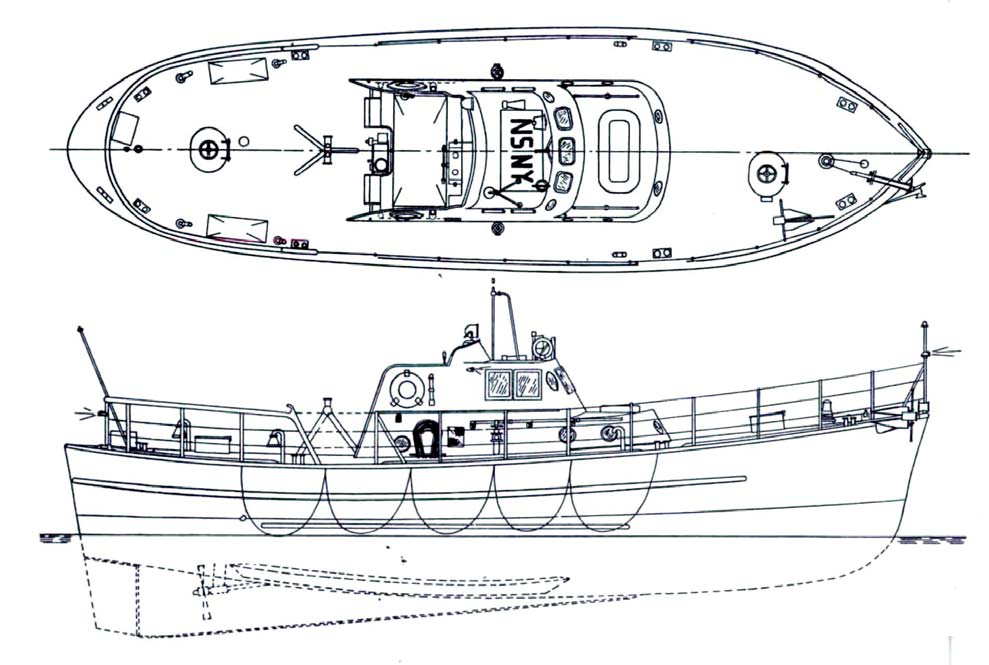
Line drawing

After World War II, reduced budgets meant the Coast Guard continued to use its two existing wooden 52' MLBs (Type F), which had been completed in 1935. By the late 1950s, the wooden MLBs were starting to wear out and the Coast Guard built a set of steel 52' MLBs at Curtis Bay Yard to replace them, specifically designed for the high surf conditions encountered in the area known as the Graveyard of the Pacific, off the coast of the Pacific Northwest (Oregon and Washington state). The steel 52' MLBs feature an aluminum superstructure and a hull divided into seven watertight compartments; because of their relatively high cost of US$250,000 (equivalent to $2,961,000 in 2025) each, only four were built. After entering service, the steering/rudder system was modified by removing the rudder guard, shortening the bilge keels, installing twin rudders, and adding a hydraulic power assist to the steering.

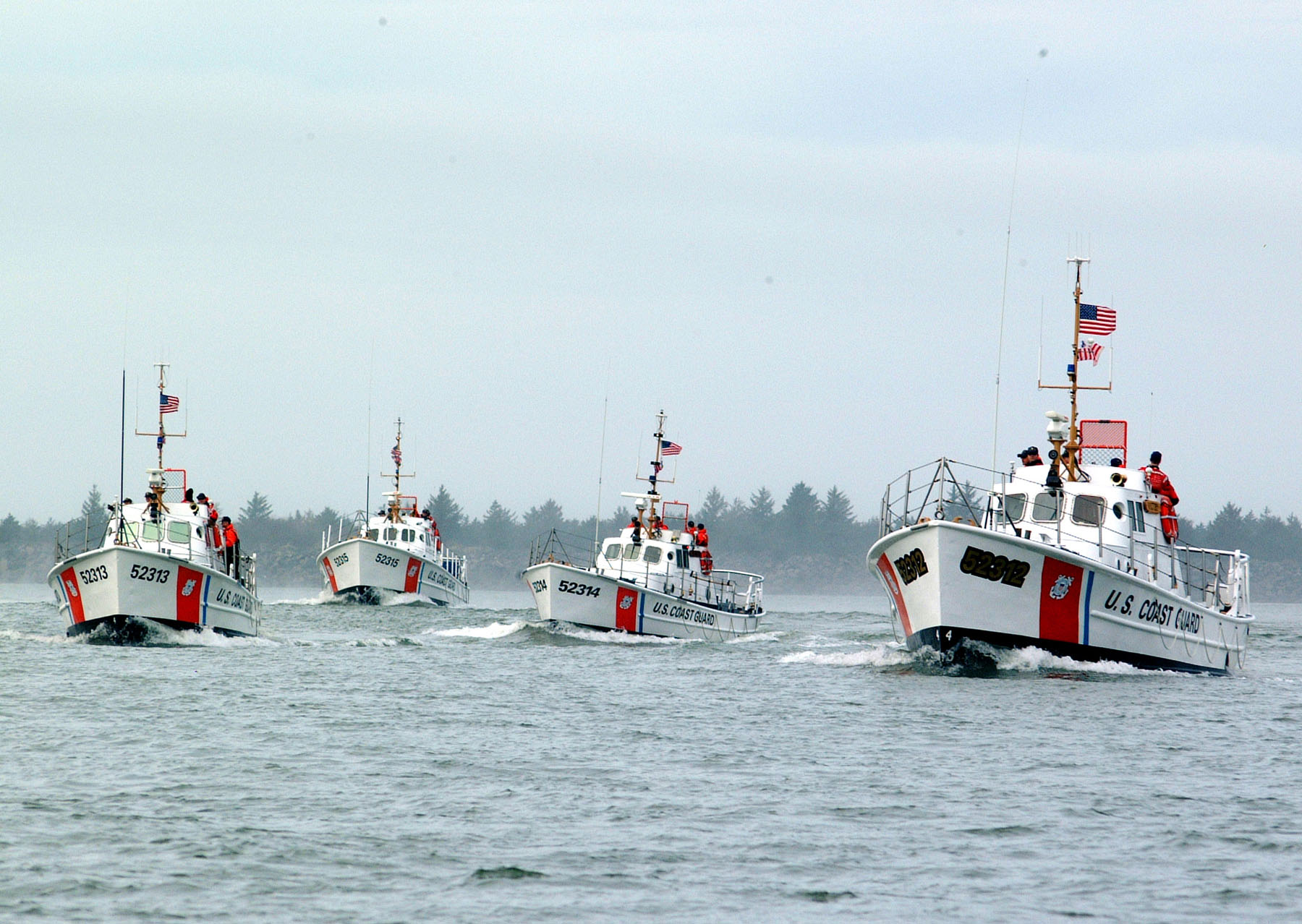
The four 52' MLBs: Invincible, Intrepid, Triumph, and Victory (L-R)

The Coast Guard bills the 52-foot MLBs, officially designated "special purpose craft – heavy weather" (SPC-HWX), as "virtually unsinkable", with self-righting and self-bailing capabilities and the ability to tow vessels as large as 750 long tons (760 t) in 30-foot (9.1 m) seas. In comparison, the next-largest 47' MLB has a towing capacity of 150 long tons (150 t). To increase their endurance and capabilities, the 52' MLB is equipped with a complete galley and a fire/salvage pump with 250 US gal/min (16 L/s) capacity.

On October 1, 2020, the fleet was placed on restricted status due to maintenance and safety concerns. By that time, the 52-ft MLBs, each more than 60 years old, relied on custom built parts to stay operational. In November 2021, all four boats were towed to Coast Guard Station Cape Disappointment and laid-up pending a decision on their future disposition. Their rescue duties were assumed by the smaller, newer 47-foot motor lifeboats.

In December 2024, the Coast Guard released a Request for Proposal for the design and production of up to six "special purpose craft – heavy weather generation II" (SPC-HWX II) to replace the four 52-foot MLBs, and began planning for their retirement and decommissioning due to the difficulty of maintenance.

== Vessels ==
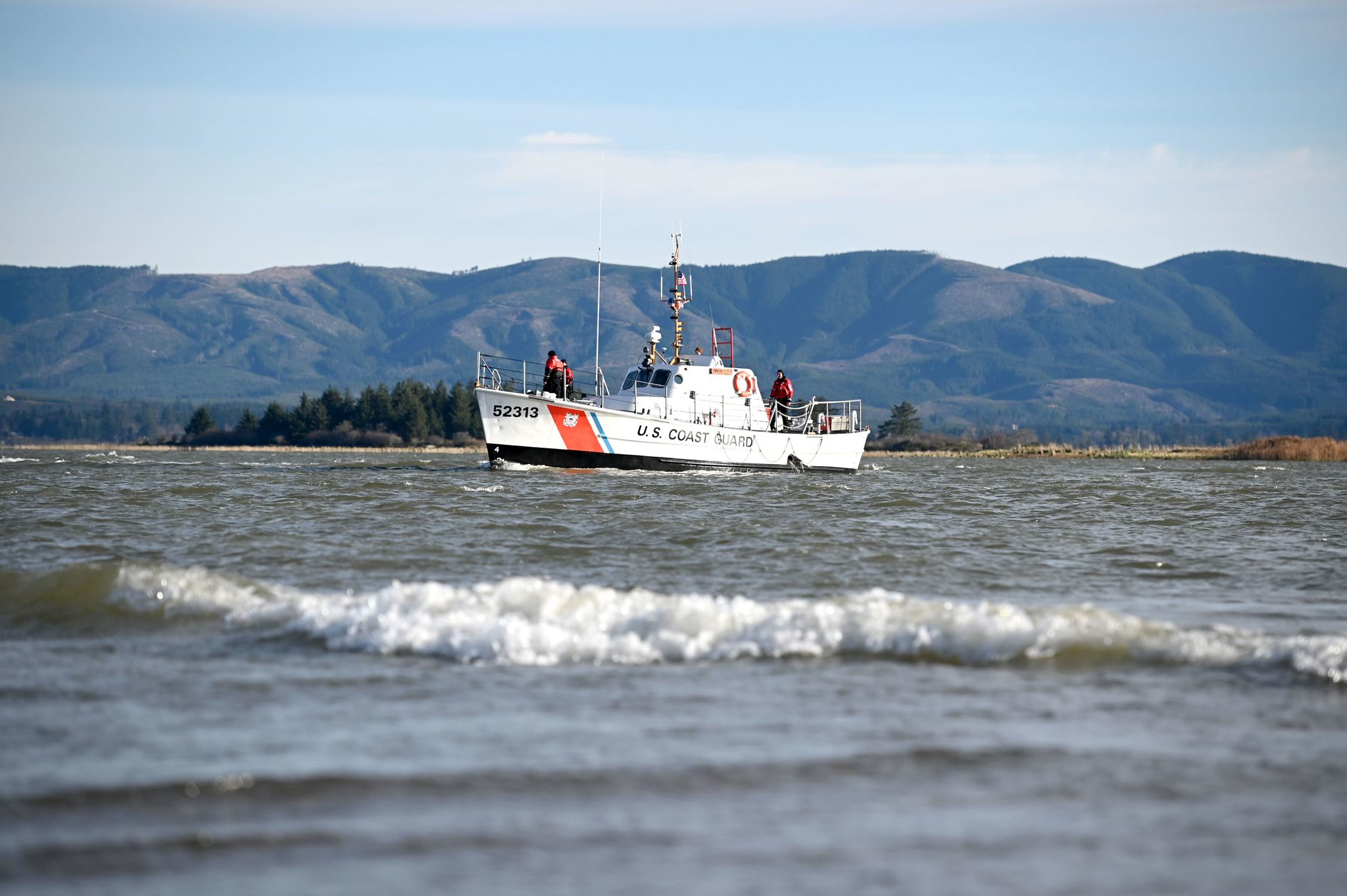
USCG Invincible II heavy weather motor lifeboat

The 52' MLBs are the only vessels of the Coast Guard less than 65 feet (20 m) in length to receive names, keeping with the tradition established by their wooden predecessors.

List of 52-foot Motor Lifeboats of the United States Coast Guard
Boat	Hull no.	Builder	Laid down	Launched	Commissioned	Homeport	Status
Victory	52312	Coast Guard Yard			November 29, 1956	Yaquina Bay	Laid up
Invincible II (Note: Named for wooden 52' MLB Invincible (CG 52300).)	52313	Coast Guard Yard			October 11, 1960	Grays Harbor	Laid up
Triumph II (Note: Named for wooden 52' MLB Triumph (CG 52301).)	52314	Coast Guard Yard			April 1, 1961	Cape Disappointment	Laid up
Intrepid	52315	Coast Guard Yard			October 11, 1961	Coos Bay	Laid up

== See also ==
- 36-foot Motor Lifeboat
- 44-foot Motor Lifeboat
- 47-foot Motor Lifeboat
