= 36-foot motor lifeboat =

United States Coast Guard lifeboat class

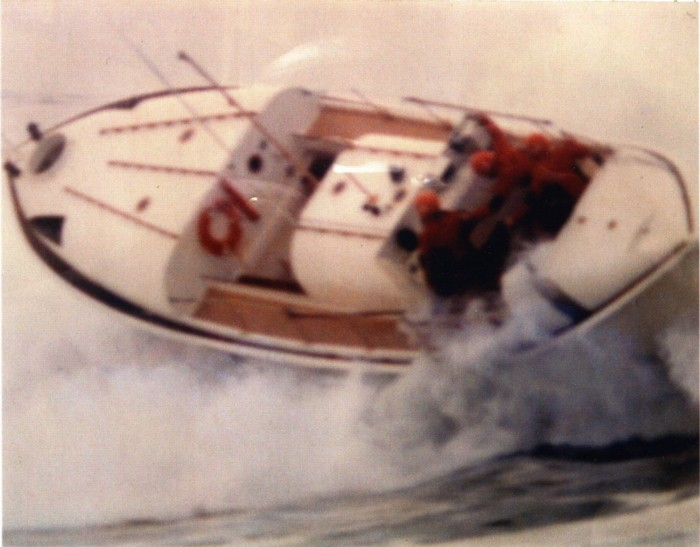
- MLB CG-36503, off the South Jetty of the Siuslaw River Bar, Florence Oregon (circa 1973-1974).

Class overview
- Name: 36 foot MLB
- Operators: United States Coast Guard
- Succeeded by: 44-foot motor lifeboat
- In service: 1929–1970's
- Planned: 218
- Completed: 218
- Active: 0

General characteristics
- Length: 36.5 ft (11.1 m)
- Beam: 10.5 ft (3.2 m)
- Draft: 3.3 ft (1.0 m)
- Propulsion: 1 × 6-cyl. Sterling Petrel
- Speed: 8.5 mph (7.4 kn) @800 RPM
- Range: 280 mi (450 km) at 8 kn (15 km/h; 9.2 mph)
- Capacity: 30 passengers
- Complement: 3 crew

The 36-foot motor lifeboat is a motor lifeboat class operated by the United States Coast Guard between 1929 and 1987. These vessels are remembered for the daring rescues performed by Coast Guard surfmen while using them.

== Design ==
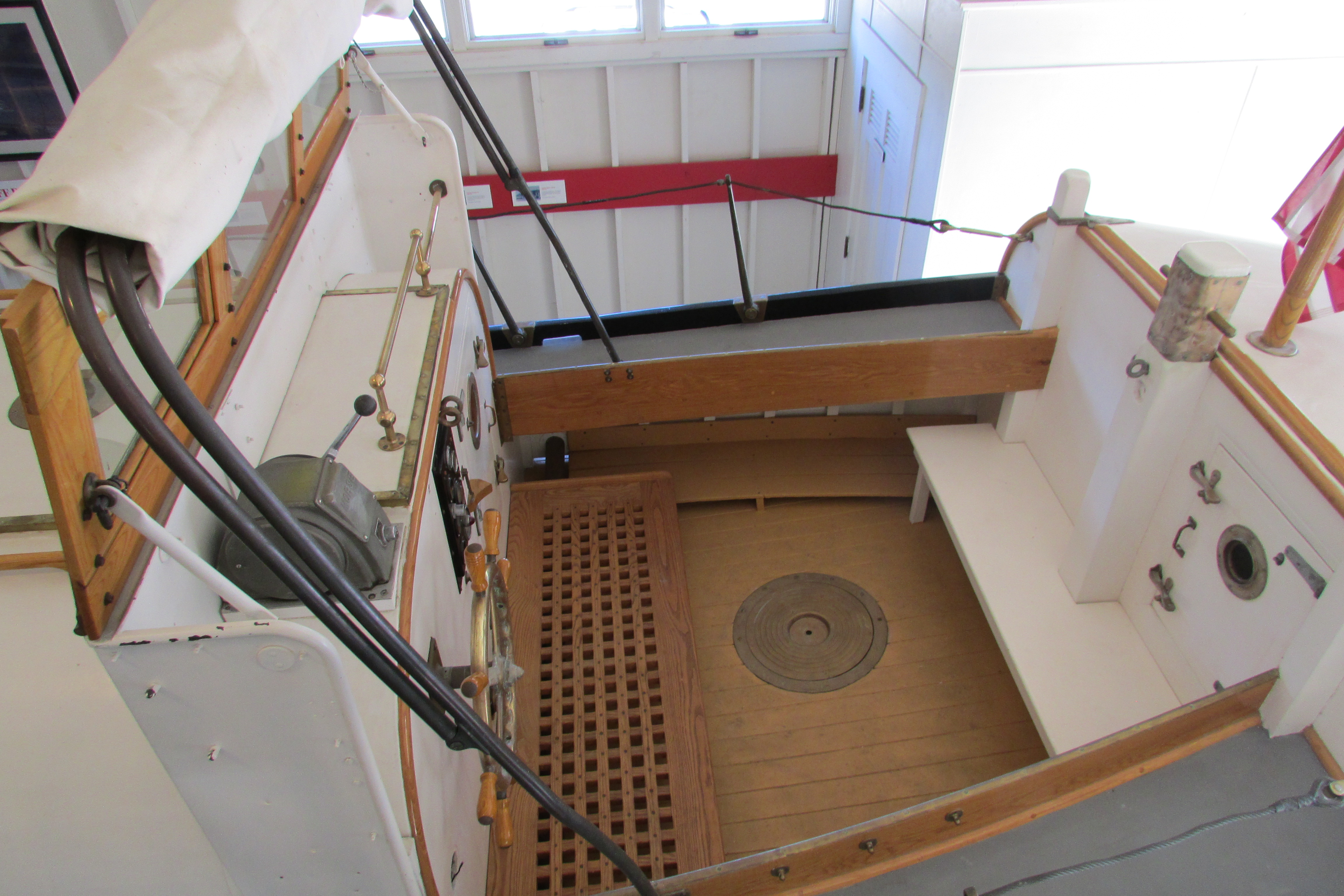
Open cockpit of CG-36504 with stowed canvas shelter at Michigan Maritime Museum

Unlike their eventual successor, the 47-foot motor lifeboats, the 36-foot class was piloted entirely from an open cockpit, where crew members were exposed to the elements. This was a hardship for the crew, as rescue operations typically are conducted under bad weather conditions, precisely the same conditions which imperil mariners and their vessels.

36' MLB Types
Type Spec	"T"	"TR"	"TRS"
Line dwg.			
Years built	1929–31	1931–37	1937–56
Qty.	27	69	108
Length	36 ft 6 in (11.13 m)	36 ft 8 in (11.18 m)	
Beam, max.	10 ft 4 1/2 in (3.162 m)	10 ft 8 7/8 in (3.273 m)	
Draft	3 ft 3 in (0.99 m)	3 ft 4 in (1.02 m)	
Displacement	19,246 lb (8,730 kg)	19,372 lb (8,787 kg)	19,675 lb (8,924 kg)
Engine	Sterling Petrel 6 cyl. / 4-cycle gasoline 90 hp (67 kW) @1000 RPM		Sterling Petrel Kermath Sea Fever Buda-Lanova Mod.6 Detroit Diesel 4-71
Range	280 nmi (520 km; 320 mi) at 8 kn (15 km/h; 9.2 mph)		
Capacity	3 crew, 30 passengers		

The original design of the 36' MLB can be traced back to 1907; the design of the 36' MLB Type "T" was finalized in 1928. Type "T" boats (built from 1929 to 1931) were assigned hull numbers in several blocks: 3389–3392, 3570–3575, 3676–3677, 3692, 3700–3710, and 3764–3766, for a total of 27 built. Type "TR" boats (1931–1937) bore slight modifications; there were 69 built, with unknown hull numbers assigned. Type "TRS" boats (1937–1956) were nearly identical to Type "TR" and were assigned hull numbers 4963–4965, 5078–5080, 5145–5149, 5174, 5181–5188, 5192, 5194, 5948–5959, and 8815–8824; the last built were assigned hull numbers 36479-36495, conforming to the modern scheme, and earlier boats were renumbered to 36416–36474. By the end of World War II, 50 Type "TRS" had been built, and an additional 58 were built afterward; production of the Type "TRS" ended in 1956.

The Type "T" (believed to indicate "new type") was designed by Alfred Hansen in 1928 with upgraded capabilities compared to the earlier Type "E" and "H" motor lifeboats, which all had approximately the same nominal 36-foot length. Compared to the Type "H", the Type "T" had a simplified sailing rig, intended only for emergency use, and was fitted with a more powerful Sterling Petrel L-head inline-6 gasoline engine. The Type "T" has 10 watertight compartments, 6 below and 4 above the main deck, and includes buoyancy blocks made from cork; it is designed to be self-bailing. Trials for the first Type "T" boat built, No. 3389, were held in May 1929, and field testing was carried out at Station Cobb Island, resulting in modifications to the rudder; the 36' MLB was able to self-right completely in six to seven seconds.

Compared to the Type "T", the "TR" (Type "T"-Revised) increased length and width slightly, raising sheer forward and aft to improve dryness, and the bronze cockpit fairing was replaced by a folding glass windshield and canvas cover for crew protection. Visually, the "TR" is distinguished from the "T" by the windshield and presence of an additional self-bailing scupper on the "TR". The first of the improved Type "TR" boats was assigned hull number 3824 after it was completed in mid-1931; in total, 69 were built, ending with hull number 4928.

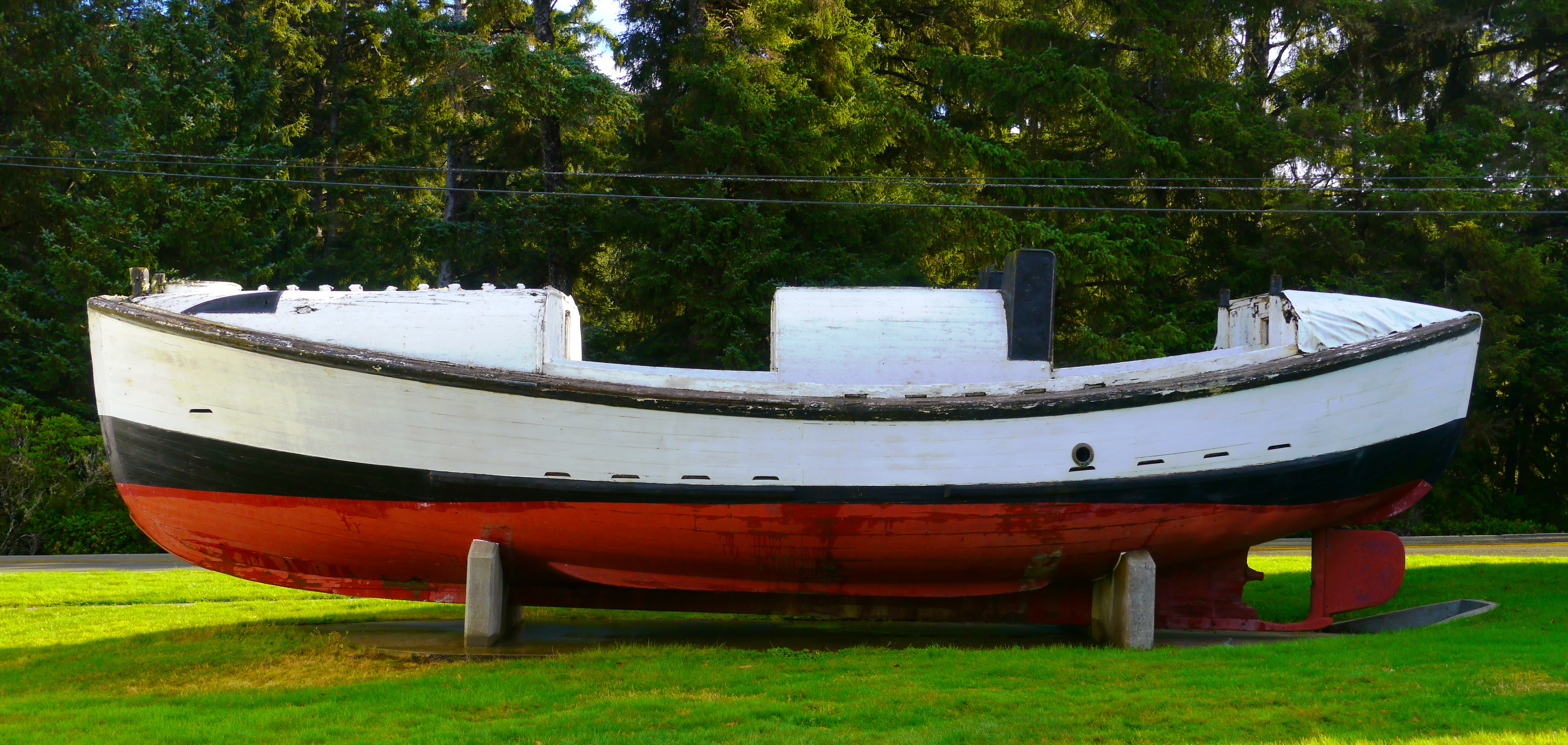
Retired Type "TRS" at Umpqua River Lighthouse Museum; note ninth scupper at bow

The Type "TRS" ("TR"-Simplified) motor lifeboat was designed to reduce weight and cost. Visually, the Type "TRS" eliminates the bright brass hand and grab rails used with the "T" and "TR" in favor of painted white oak; in addition, there are nine self-bailing scuppers on each side of the "TRS", compared to eight on the "TR" and seven on the "T", and the sailing rig has been removed entirely. Below the waterline, the prewar "TRS" boats had a simplified open rudder and propeller arrangement and internally, they continued with gasoline Sterling Petrel or Kermath Sea Farer engines; starting in 1946, new "TRS" boats were built with Buda-Lanova Model 6 DTMR-486 and Detroit Diesel 4-71 diesel engines instead. The first boat was completed in early 1937 at the Curtis Bay Yard and assigned hull number 4963. Although Coast Guard production ended in 1956, one additional Type "TRS" was built for the United States Navy in 1959.

== Operating history ==
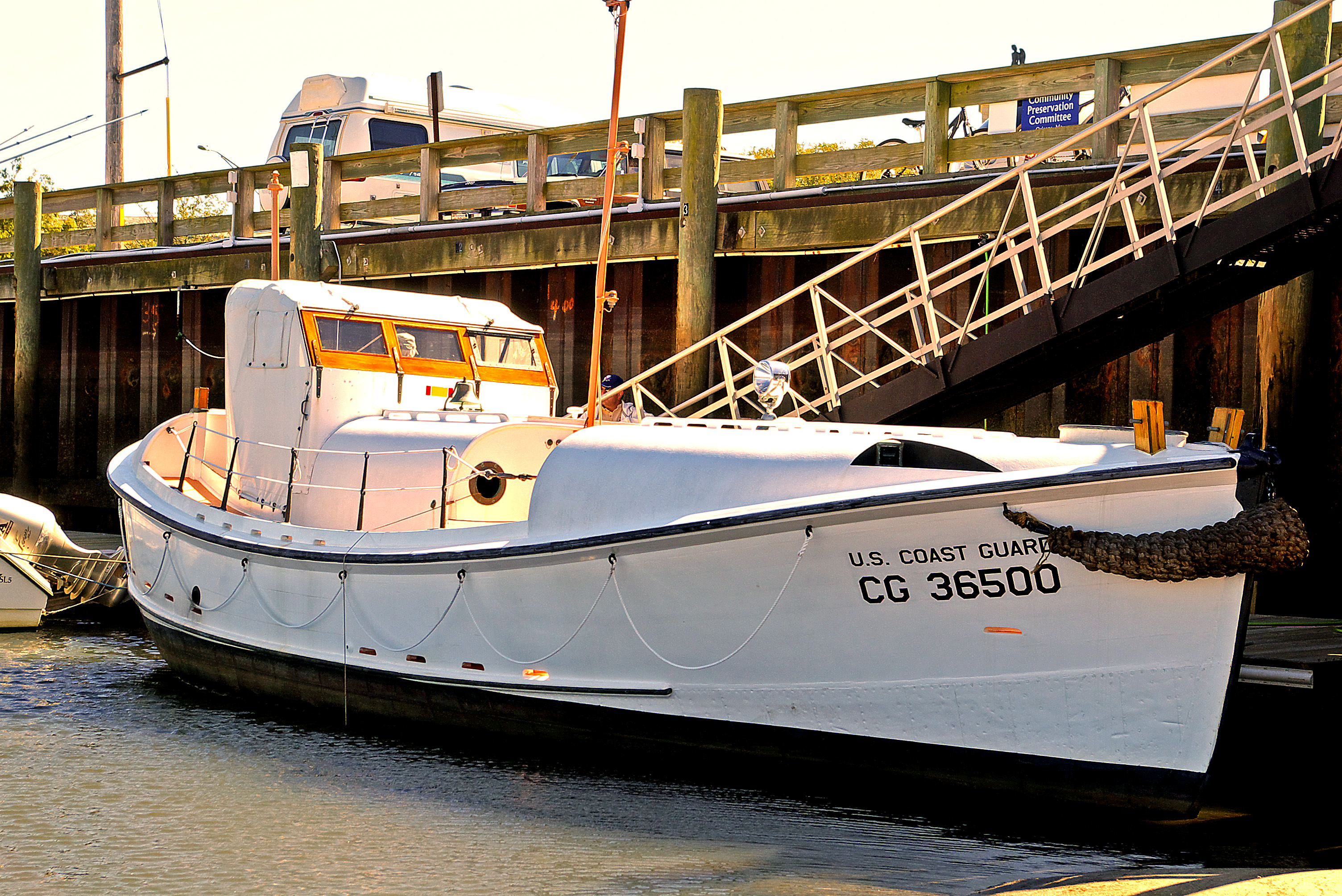
Type "TRS" CG 36500 with folding windshield and canvas cover installed

The Coast Guard built the first of version these vessels in 1929 (Type "T"), and retired the last active version (Type "TRS", built from 1937–1956), in 1987 (CG-36535 at Coast Guard Station Depoe Bay); starting from the 1960s, they were replaced by 44-foot motor lifeboats with steel hulls.

The majority (55.5%) of Type "T" boats were assigned to lifeboat stations around the Great Lakes region, most directly replacing Type "E" lifeboats.

The most memorable rescue performed using a 36' MLB was that of crew members of the stricken SS Pendleton by CG 36500 under the command of Boatswain's Mate Bernard C. Webber. CG 36500 was retired from active service in 1968, and has since been restored and preserved as a floating museum. The 2016 feature film The Finest Hours is based on the 1952 Pendleton rescue, and was filmed using CG-36460.

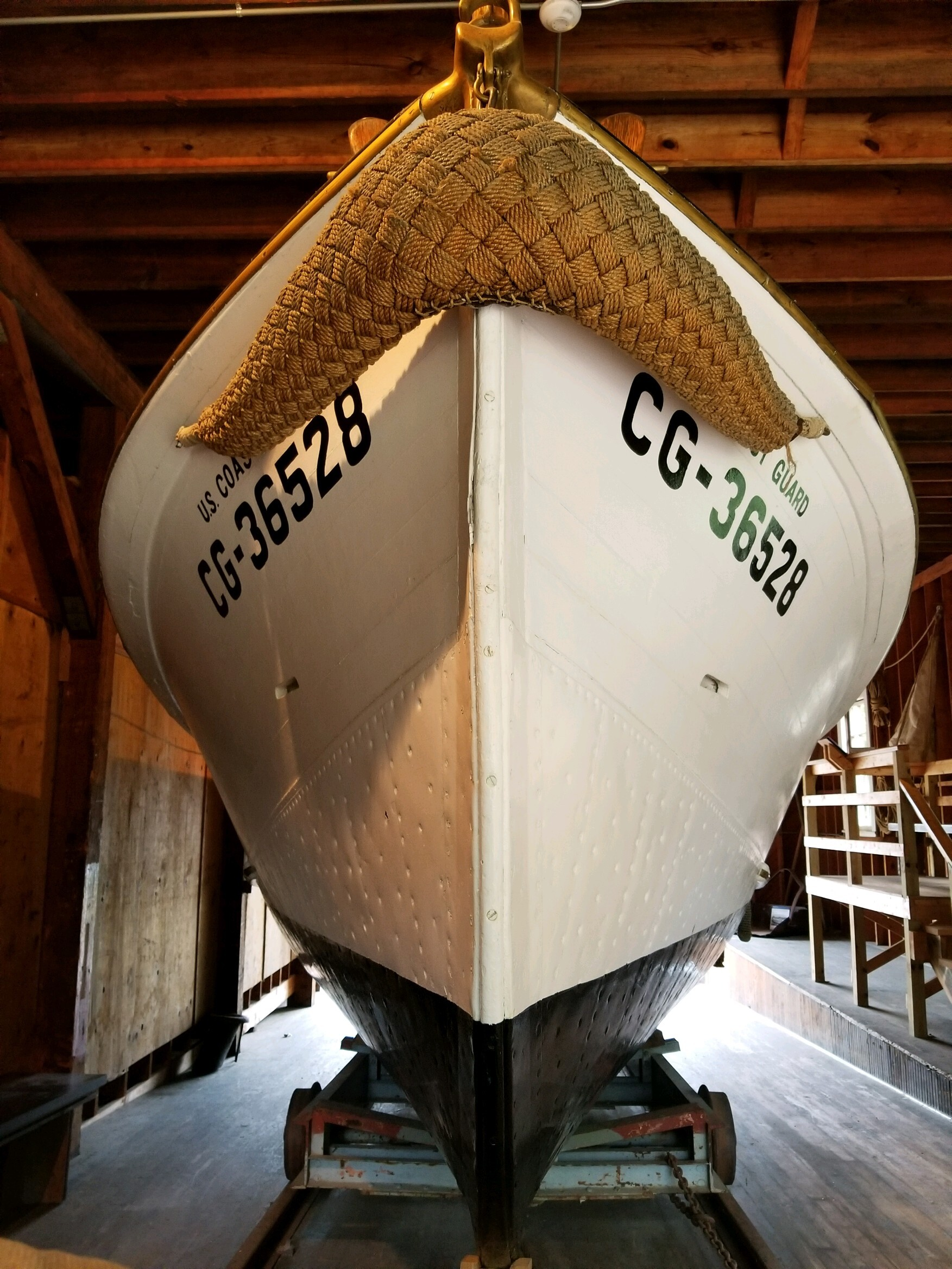
Station Grand Marais motor life boat is now at the Munising Coast Guard Station Museum, at Sand Point in Munising, Michigan

Retired 36-foot motor lifeboats on display
Hull No.	City	State	Name of Location
CG-36460	South Haven	Michigan	Michigan Maritime Museum
CG-36474	Astoria	Oregon	Columbia River Maritime Museum
CG-36495	Ilwaco	Washington	Coast Guard Station Cape Disappointment
CG-36498	Port Orford	Oregon	Port Orford Life Boat Station Museum
CG-36500	Orleans	Massachusetts	Coast Guard Motor Lifeboat 36500 Exhibit
CG-36503	Newport	Oregon	Coast Guard Station Newport
CG-36504	South Haven	Michigan	Michigan Maritime Museum
CG-36515	Samoa	California	Coast Guard Station Humboldt Bay
CG-36527	Duluth	Minnesota	Coast Guard Station Duluth
CG-36528	Munising	Michigan	Munising Coast Guard Station Museum
CG-36513 (Note: currently mis-numbered as 36531)	Garibaldi	Oregon	Coast Guard Memorial
CG-36535	Philadelphia	Pennsylvania	Independence Seaport Museum
Unknown	Glen Haven	Michigan	Glen Haven Cannery Boathouse
Unknown	Winchester Bay	Oregon	Umpqua River Lighthouse Museum
