= 52-foot Motor Lifeboat (Type F) =

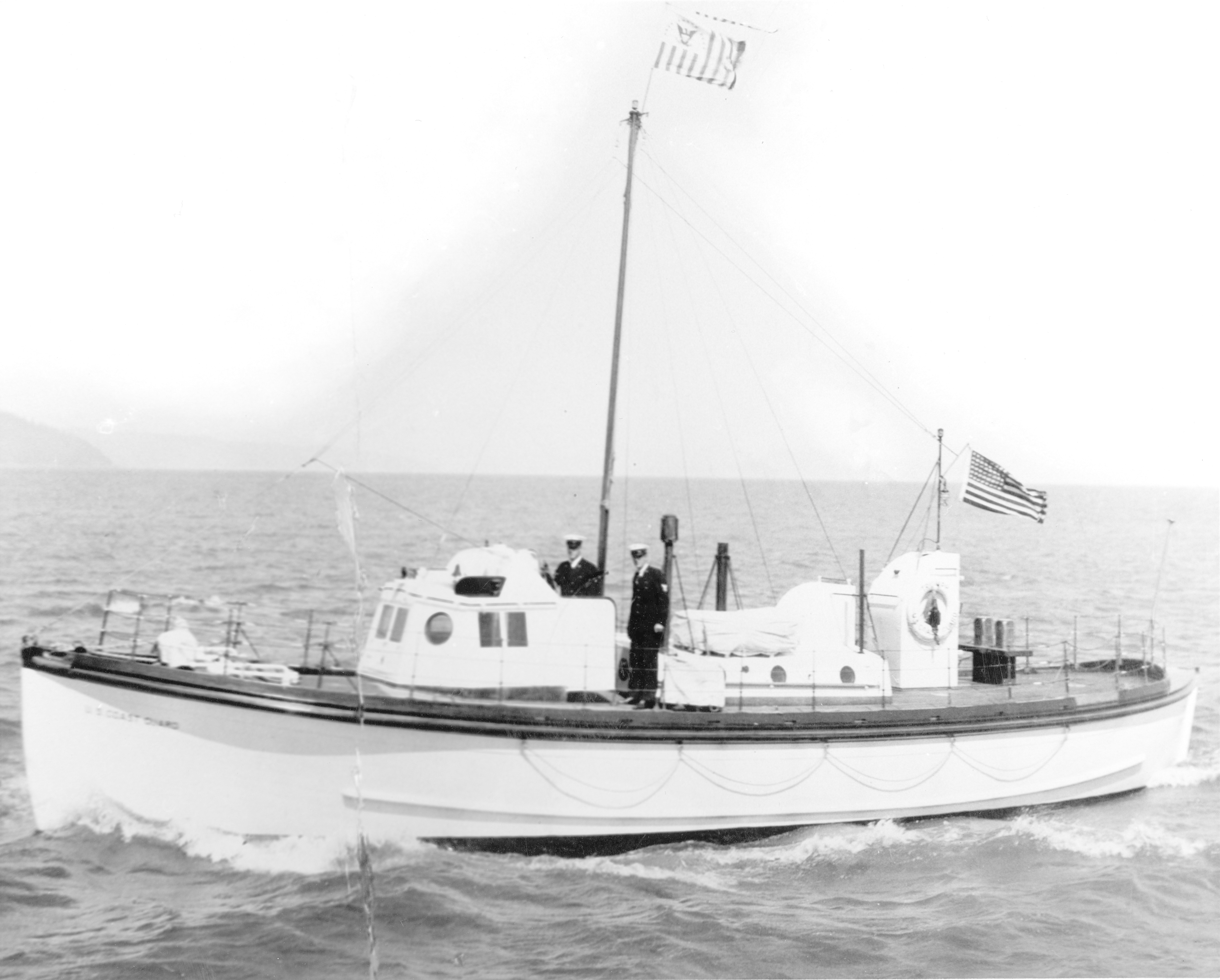
- Triumph, operating from Station Point Adams at the mouth of the Columbia River.

Class overview
- Name: 52' MLB (wood)
- Builders: Curtis Bay Yard
- Succeeded by: 52' MLB (steel)
- Cost: US$70,000 (1936)
- In service: 1935–1967
- Completed: 2

General characteristics
- Displacement: 30 tons
- Length: 52 feet (16 m)
- Beam: 14 feet 3 1/2 inches (4.356 m)
- Draught: 6 feet 8 inches (2.03 m)
- Propulsion: 1×Buda 6-cyl. diesel, 150 hp (110 kW)
- Speed: 10.5 kn (19.4 km/h; 12.1 mph)
- Range: 600 nautical miles (1,100 km)
- Complement: 4

The 52-foot Motor Lifeboat was a wooden-hulled motor lifeboat (MLB) class operated by the United States Coast Guard between 1935 and 1967 which included two ships: Invincible (CG 52300) and Triumph (CG 52301).

The boats were not equipped with an anti-capsizing feature; Triumph sank after a large wave struck her during a rescue operation at the mouth of the Columbia River on January 12, 1961. Four steel-hulled 52-foot Motor Lifeboats were designed with self-righting buoyancy chambers and completed between 1956 and 1961 to replace the older wooden-hulled MLBs. Invincible was transferred to the United States Navy in 1967.

== History and design ==
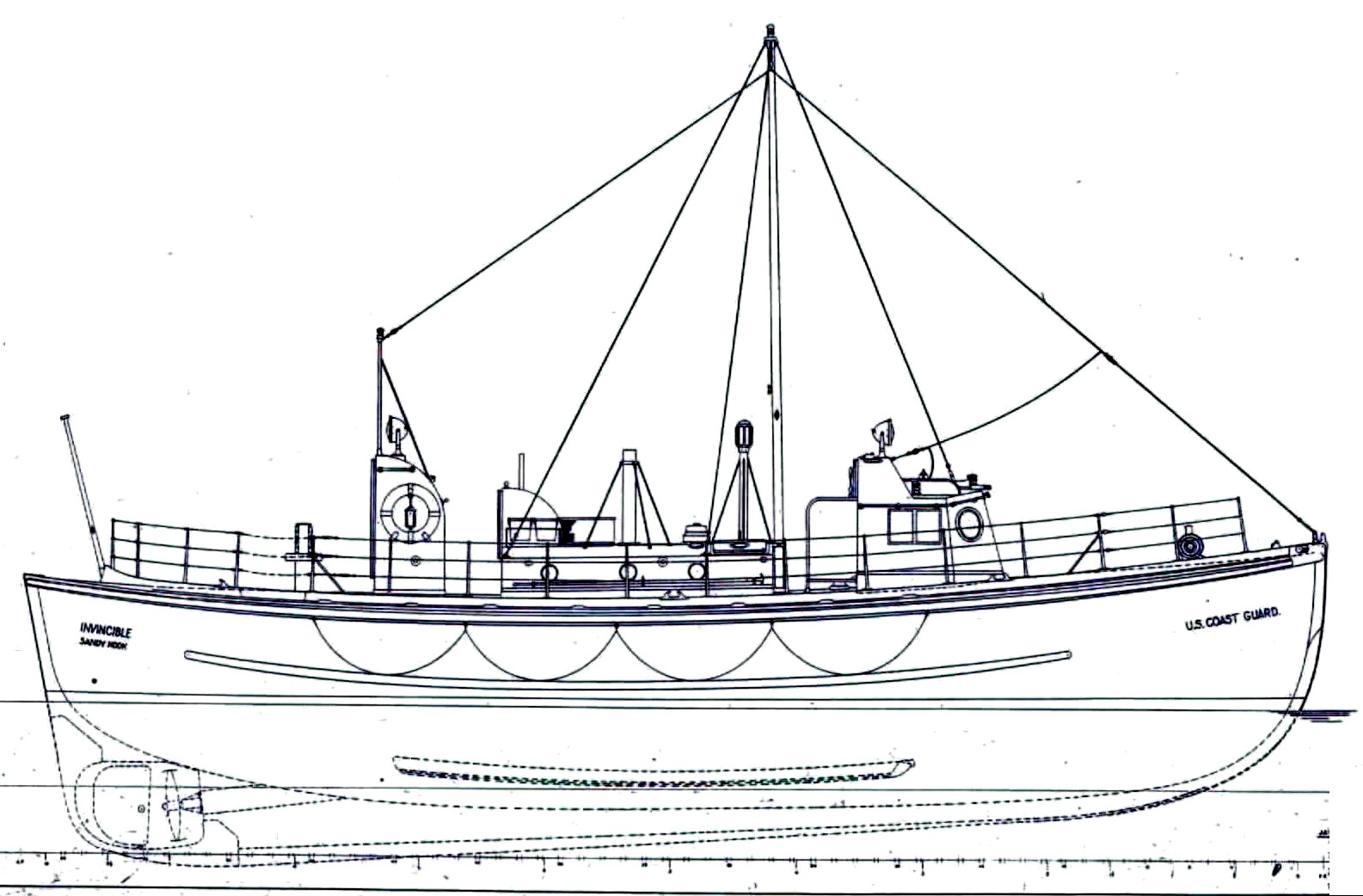
Line drawing

The Triumph and her sister, Invincible, were the only vessels in their class. Initially, the class was designated Type F; Triumph (Boat No. 4460) was completed first in Fiscal Year (FY) 1934–35, followed by Invincible (No. 4000) in FY 1936; they were renumbered to CG-52301 and -52300, respectively, during World War II. As completed in 1935, they each cost approximately US$70,000 (equivalent to $1,586,000 in 2024).

They were designed to operate in extreme sea conditions, complementing the Coast Guard's smaller 36 foot motor lifeboats, which had a shorter range and lacked onboard facilities for sleeping and meal preparation. The 52-foot MLBs could carry sixty rescued people below decks and a hundred above, weather permitting. Although they were not designed to be self-righting, the mahogany hull was divided into eight watertight compartments, of which two could flood without jeopardizing flotation. The boats were overhauled in 1945 and fitted with a new 8-cylinder diesel engine from Superior, which was in turn replaced by a General Motors (Detroit Diesel) engine in the 1950s.

The 52-foot wooden-hulled motor lifeboats were obsoleted and replaced by their steel-hulled successor 52-foot Motor Lifeboats by the 1960s.

=== Invincible (CG 52300) ===
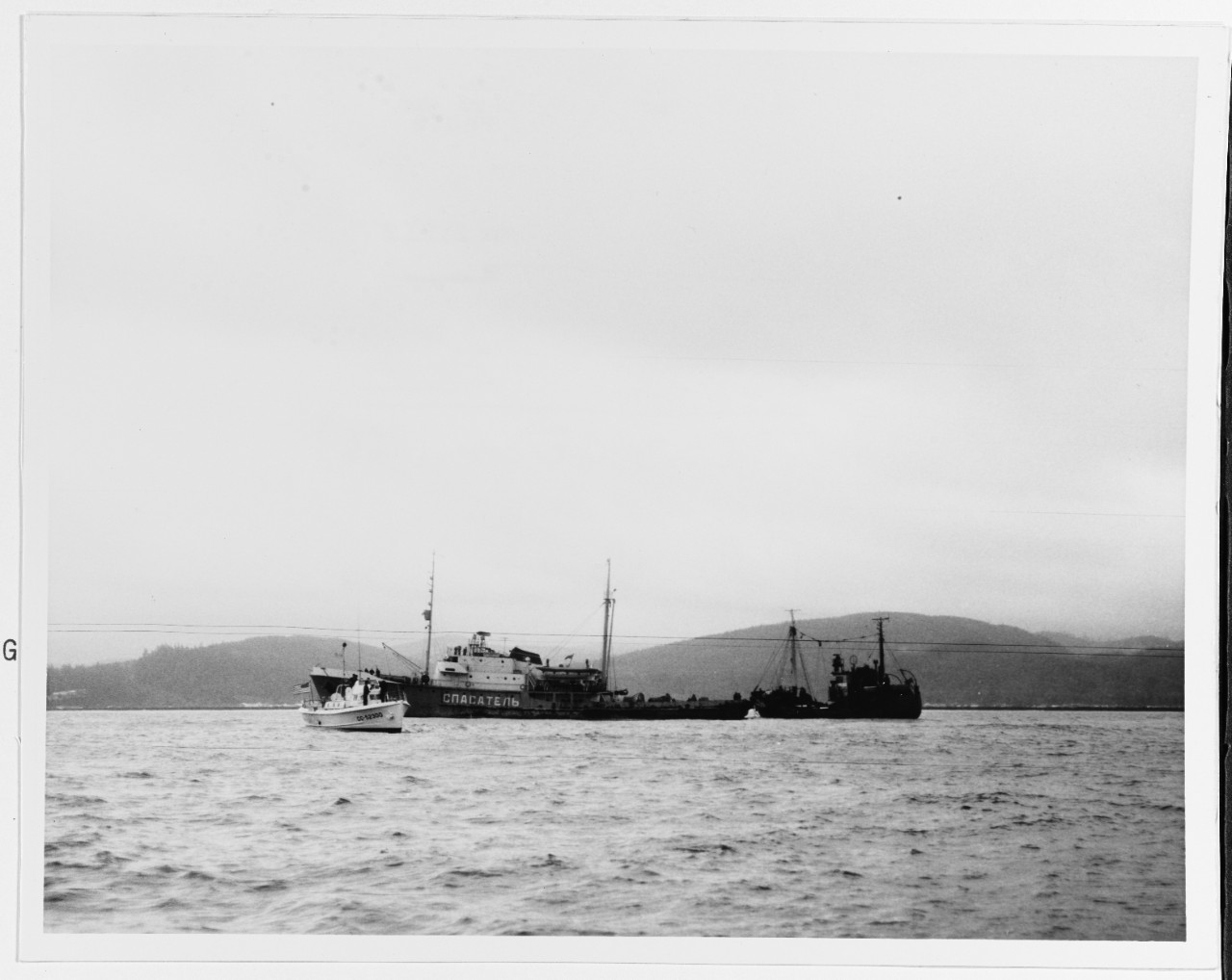
Invincible monitoring Soviet vessels SS Dekabrist (ex-E. H. Harriman) and Azimut, which had taken shelter in the Strait of Juan de Fuca during a storm (1966).

Invincible operated from Coast Guard Station Sandy Hook from 1935 and later transferred under her own power in 1941 to the Pacific Northwest coast, where she operated from Grays Harbor Lifeboat Station and later Coos Bay Lifeboat Station until 1967, when she was transferred to the Navy.

In 1959, Invincible rolled over but did not sink, as the engine room vents and exhaust had been modified to resist water ingress. On January 28, 1960, the Invincible's engine stalled after she rolled 90–100° to port while transiting the Grays Harbor Bar and she was taken in tow by the fishing vessel Barbara Lee; the Barbara Lee subsequently capsized after being struck by a sneaker wave, and a 36-foot motor lifeboat was dispatched to hold Invincible until she could be towed to safety by USCGC McLane. One of the three crew members aboard Barbara Lee was rescued; the other two were killed.

As of 2009, ex-Invincible was still afloat as a stripped-down hulk, having been converted to a fishing vessel at some point after leaving government service.

=== Triumph (CG 52301) ===
Triumph operated from Coast Guard Station Point Adams from 1935 until she capsized off the coast of Oregon on January 12, 1961, during the rescue of a disabled fishing vessel, Mermaid, which also was lost. Triumph later was re-righted and washed ashore. Modern motor lifeboats are designed to be self-righting by incorporating buoyancy chambers within the hull which rapidly force the boats right-side-up if they overturn.

That night, a 36-foot motor lifeboat, CG-36454, and a 40-foot utility boat (UTB), CG-40564, both from Cape Disappointment Lifeboat Station, responded to a distress call from the 38-foot crab boat Mermaid from Ilwaco, Washington, which had lost its rudder at the mouth of the Columbia River. Mermaid's mayday call was relayed to Cape Disappointment at approximately 4:15 p.m. and CG-40564 began towing Mermaid. The UTB radioed Point Adams for assistance, as she could not surmount the waves at the mouth bar, and Triumph was dispatched. When she arrived at approximately 7 p.m., Triumph took up the tow.

During the initial rescue, CG-36454 developed a leak and collided with CG-40564, resulting in a leak in the 36' MLB's stern compartment. After passing the tow to Triumph, the 40' UTB was crossing the bar when a large wave caused CG-40564 to founder, and the 36' MLB also was swamped by large waves, but the 36' MLB re-righted and, after rescuing the crew of CG-40564, radioed Point Adams and proceeded 7 mi (11 km) west to the lightship Columbia and put the survivors on the lightship safely. Point Adams dispatched two more 36' MLBs, CG-36554 and CG-36535, to assist Triumph.

At 7:30 and again at 7:45 p.m., heavy waves parted the tow line from Triumph, which radioed Point Adams it was attempting another rescue at 8 p.m.; however, Mermaid sent out another distress call at 8:13 p.m., advising that Triumph had capsized and that one of its crew had been rescued by Mermaid. After the 36' MLBs CG-36554 and CG-36535 arrived, CG-36535 began towing Mermaid at 9:10 p.m., but another large breaking wave parted the line at 9:45 p.m., sinking Mermaid; Coast Guard aircraft arrived with USCGC Yocona around 10 p.m. and began searching for survivors. In total, seven were killed: both crew members of Mermaid and five of the six aboard Triumph; the sole survivor from Triumph, Gordon Huggins, who was not the one rescued by Mermaid, was found onshore by a foot patrol at 10:45 p.m. Huggins died in March 2019.
