= Surfman =

Coast Guard small boat qualification

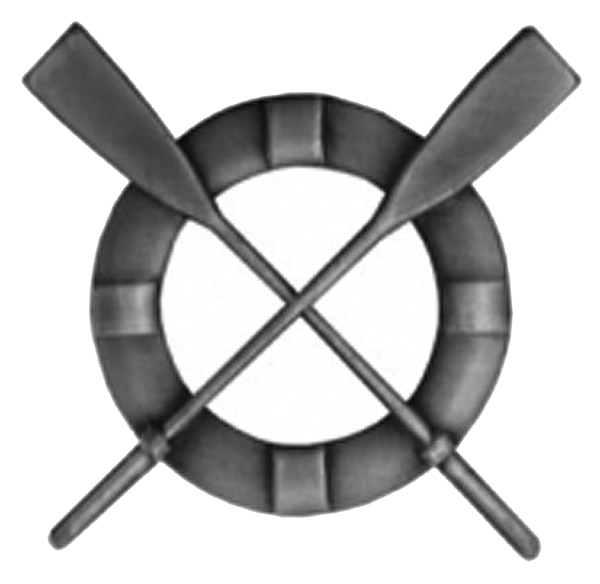
Surfman insignia used by United States Coast Guard, consisting of a pewter-toned life buoy crossed by two oars.

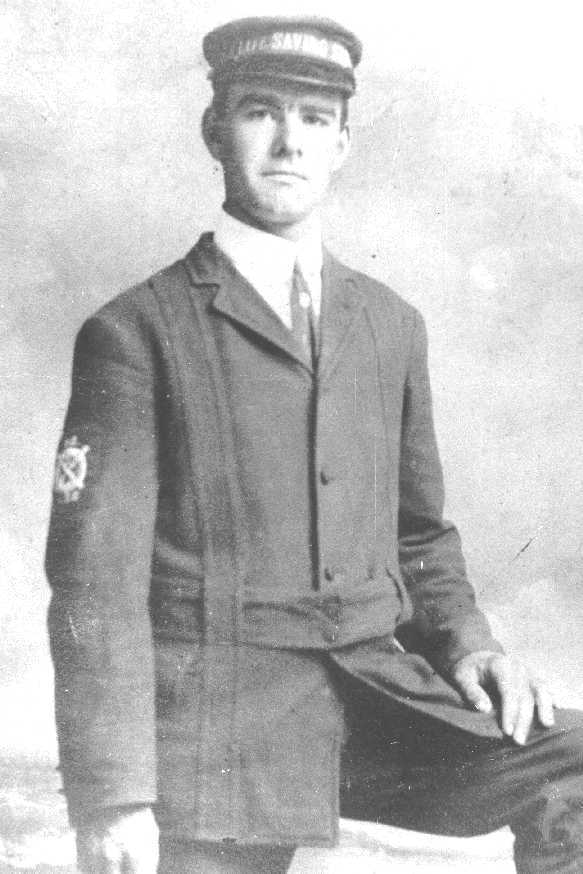
Surfman Howard Daniel Browning of Station Narrangansett Pier in winter uniform, c. 1909

Surfman is the highest qualification for small boat operations in the United States Coast Guard. Originally, surfmen were members of one of the Coast Guard's predecessors, the United States Lifesaving Service.

Coast Guard Surfmen are rated to operate the 47-foot Motor Lifeboat in its most extreme operating conditions after undergoing training at the National Motor Lifeboat School.

== List of Surf Stations ==
The Surf Station designation is reserved for locations where wave conditions exceed 8 feet (2.4 m) for 36 days or more per year.

U.S. Coast Guard Surf Stations
Name	Image	District	Sector	City	State	Notes	Ref.
Station Barnegat Light		5	Delaware Bay	Barnegat Light	New Jersey		
Station Bodega Bay		11	San Francisco	Bodega Bay	California		
Station Cape Disappointment		13	Columbia River	Ilwaco	Washington	Home base for the National Motor Lifeboat School.	
Station Chatham		1	Southeastern New England	Chatham	Massachusetts		
Station Chetco River		13	North Bend	Brookings	Oregon		
Station Coos Bay		13	North Bend	Charleston	Oregon		
Station Depoe Bay		13	North Bend	Newport	Oregon		
Station Golden Gate		11	San Francisco	Sausalito	California		
Station Grays Harbor		13	Columbia River	Westport	Washington		
Station Hatteras Inlet		5	North Carolina	Ocracoke Island	North Carolina		
Station Humboldt Bay		11	Humboldt Bay	Humboldt Bay	California		
Station Merrimack River		1	Boston	Newburyport	Massachusetts		
Station Morro Bay		11	Los Angeles / Long Beach	Morro Bay	California		
Station Oregon Inlet		5	North Carolina	Nags Head	North Carolina		
Station Quillayute River		13	Puget Sound	La Push	Washington		
Station Siuslaw River		13	North Bend	Florence	Oregon		
Station Tillamook Bay		13	Columbia River	Garibaldi	Oregon		
Station Umpqua River		13	North Bend	Winchester Bay	Oregon		
Station Yaquina Bay		13	North Bend	Newport	Oregon		

== See also ==
- Rasmus Midgett
- Surfman Badge
