= Columbia River Bar Pilots =

American maritime pilotage company

Coordinates: 46.1899°N 123.8257°W

- Company type: Private
- Founded: 1846
- Headquarters: Astoria, Oregon, U.S.
- Services: Maritime pilotage
- Website: www.columbiariverbarpilots.com

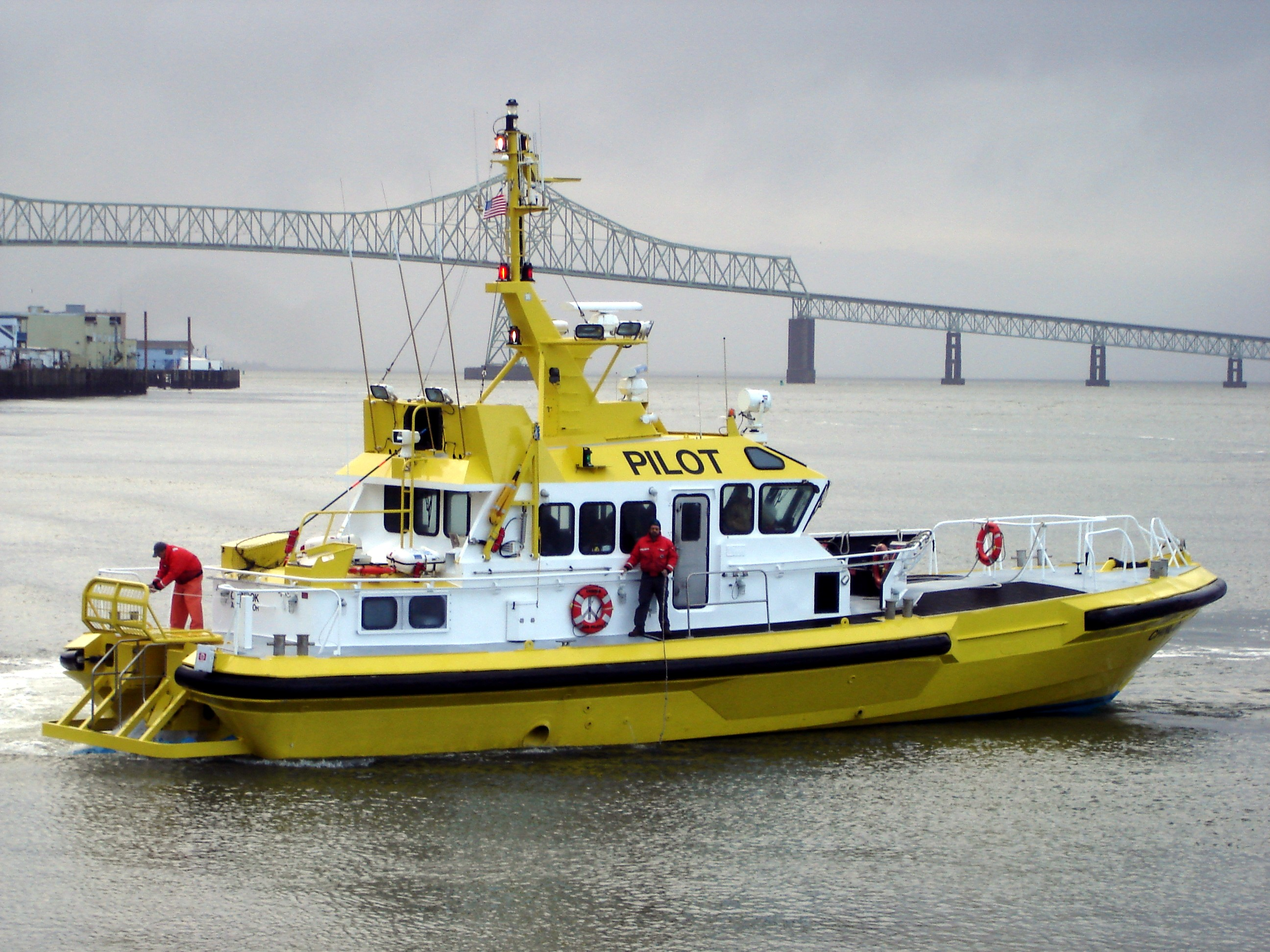
The Columbia River Bar Pilots' Chinook in 2008

The Columbia River Bar Pilots is a maritime pilotage company based in Astoria, Oregon, United States. The company helps vessels navigate the Columbia Bar, a treacherous area for marine traffic at the mouth of the Columbia River between Oregon and Washington.

== History ==
The Columbia River Bar Pilots traces its origins to 1846, when the Oregon Provisional Legislature passed a bill to create what would become the Oregon Board of Pilot Commissioners. The board soon licensed four pilots, notably George Flavel, who established a virtual monopoly with his associates over piloting on the Columbia Bar and amassed a personal fortune.

== Operations ==
The Columbia Bar, sometimes referred to as the "Graveyard of the Pacific", is located at the mouth of the Columbia River as it flows into the Pacific Ocean. The site sees a high volume of commercial shipping, and all vessels engaged in foreign trade are required to have a Columbia River Bar Pilot on board to navigate the area. The company assists approximately 3,600 vessels per year as of 2025.

The Columbia River Bar Pilots is regulated by the Oregon Board of Maritime Pilots. The company only operates at the Columbia Bar near Astoria; once past the bar, vessels fall within the purview of the Columbia River Pilots, an association of maritime pilots based in Portland, Oregon.
