= Surfman Badge =

Badge of the United States Coast Guard

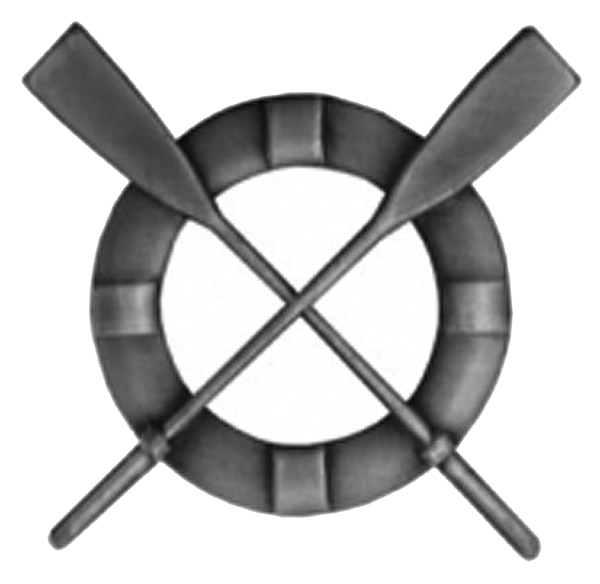
Surfman Badge

The Surfman Badge is a military badge of the United States Coast Guard, issued to enlisted or officer personnel who qualify as Coxswains authorized to operate surf boats in heavy surf. Those so qualified are referred to as surfmen, a term that was originally used by the United States Life-Saving Service, one of the predecessors to the Coast Guard.

Surf boats are boats that are designed to operate under extreme weather and sea conditions. Some of the surf boats that the Coast Guard operates include the 47-foot Motor Lifeboat (MLB), the (now decommissioned) 44-foot MLB, 42-foot Near Shore Lifeboat (SPC-NLB) and the 52-foot MLB (the only "Boats" in the Coast Guard to be given names, such as Victory at Station Yaquina Bay, Oregon, the oldest steel motor lifeboat in the US Coast Guard).

Surfman Creed

When the Lord breathes His wrath above the bosom of the waters,
When the rollers are a-pounding on the shore,
When the mariner's a-thinking of his wife and son's and daughters,
And the little home he'll, maybe see no more;

When the bars are white and yeasty, and the shoals are all a-frothing,
When the Nor'easter's cutting like a knife;
Through the seethin' roar and screech he's patroling on the beach,
The Government's hired man for saving life.

He's a-struggling with the gusts that strike and bruise him like a hammer;
He's a-fighting sand that stings like swarmin' bees,
He's a-listening through the whirlwind and the thunder and the clamor,
A-listening for the signal from the seas.

He's a-breaking ribs and muscles launching lifeboats in the surges,
He's dripping wet and chilled in every bone,
He's a-bringing men from death, back to flesh and blood and breath,
And never stops to think about his own.

He's a pulling at an oar that is freezing to his fingers,
he's a-clinging to the rigging of a wreck.
He knows destructions nearer every minute that he lingers;
But it doesn't seem to worry him a speck.

He is draggin' draggled corpes from the clutches of the combers,
The kind of job a common man would shirk;
But he takes them from the waves and fit them for graves,
And he thinks it's all included in his work.

He is a rigger, rower, swimmer, sailor, doctor, undertaker,
And he's good at every one of them the same;
And he risks his life for others in the quicksand and the breakers,
And a thousand wives and mothers bless his name.

He's an angel dressed in oilskins; he's a saint in the "Sou'wester,"
He's a pluck as they come, or ever can;
He's a hero born and bred, but it hasn't swelled his head,
For he's just the U.S. Government's hired man.

— Training Center Yorktown

== Requirements ==
To be awarded the Surfman Badge, a service member must undergo training in actual surf and breaking bar conditions, accumulate a minimum number of hours operating in these conditions, while conducting practical exercises and undergo a rigorous underway check ride as well as an oral review board. The process to qualify for a Surfman Badge requires at least eight years of training and experience. Coast Guard regulations do not permit the wearing of both Surfman and Coxswain insignia simultaneously.

The training includes a monthlong course at the National Motor Lifeboat School at Station Cape Disappointment (Ilwaco, Washington) to train prospective surfmen in handling the 47' MLB in rough weather.

== History ==
Although the earliest ancestors to the United States Life-Saving Service started before the Civil War, it was not officially established as a branch of the United States Treasury Department until June 1878, under Sumner I. Kimball, who led the Treasury's Revenue Marine Service. Kimball established the first training routines for surfmen, which included the Beach Apparatus Drill (firing rope lines via Lyle gun to establish a breeches buoy for rescues close to shore; the drill had to be completed within five minutes), boat handling (righting surfboats), first aid, signal flags, and nightly beach patrols.

=== Motto ===
The Surfmen's motto was adopted around the beginning of the 20th Century: "The book says that you've got to go out, but it doesn't say a word about coming back." This is sometimes shortened as "You have to go out, but you don't have to come back", as popularized in the 2016 film The Finest Hours.
