= Maritime Search and Rescue (Mexico) =

- Búsqueda y Rescate Marítimo
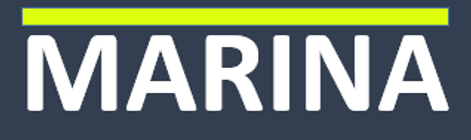
- Uniform and boat logo
- Country: Mexico
- Branch: Mexican Navy
- Role: Maritime search and rescue
- Colors: Red, gold, and white

Insignia
- Racing stripe

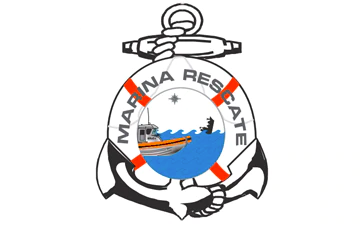
- Flag

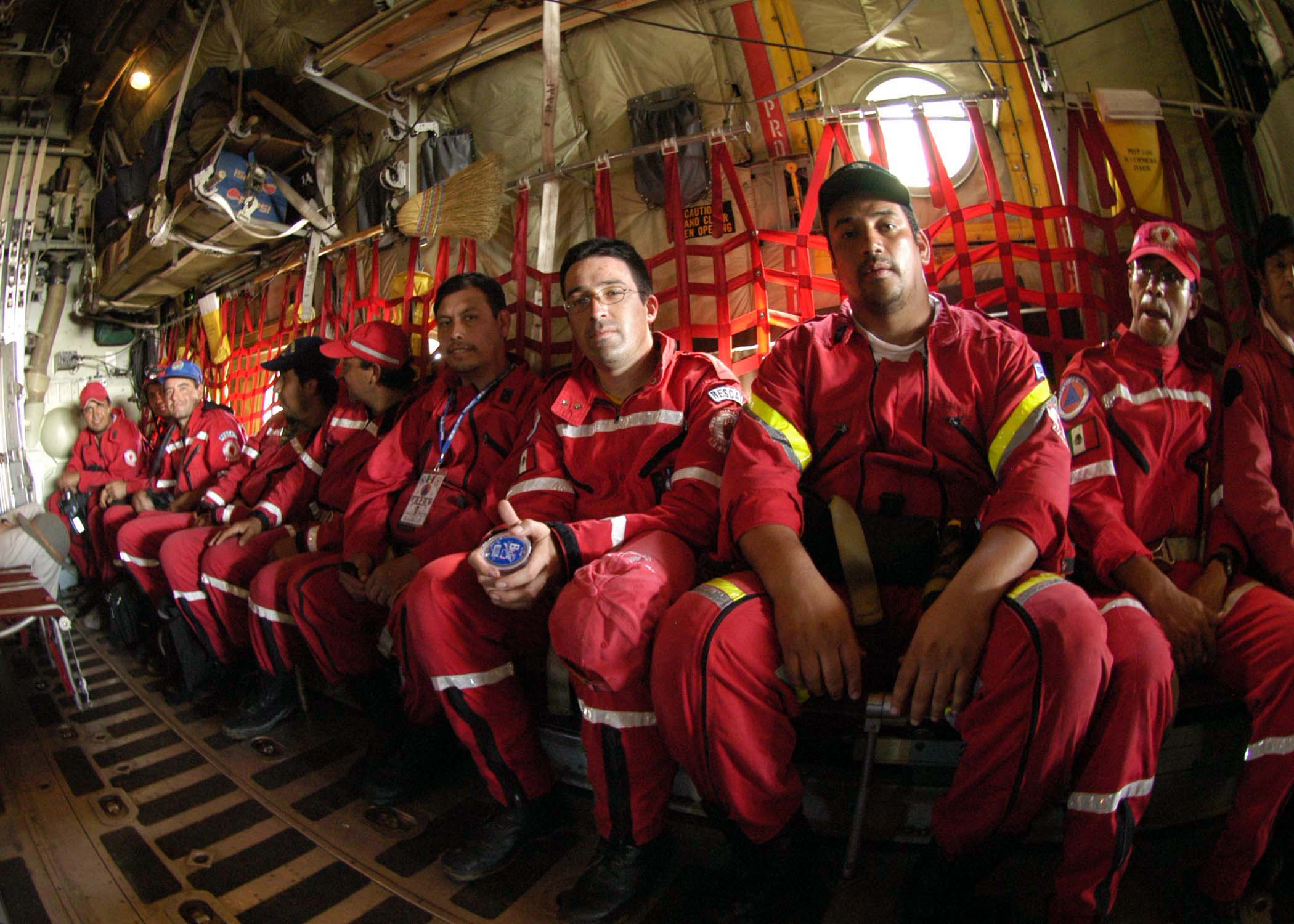
A Mexican Navy Maritime Search and Rescue team departs on a Royal Australian Air Force C-130H Hercules transport plane at Sultan Iskandar Muda International Airport in Banda Aceh, Sumatra, Indonesia en route to Thailand to help survivors of the tsunami disaster in 2005

The Maritime Search and Rescue (Spanish: Búsqueda y Rescate Marítimo) is the Mexican Navy's SAR unit. It is responsible for improving the quality and effectiveness of the Navy's response to Mexico's maritime emergencies. The Mexican Navy historically has been responsible for the search and rescue operations using its available resources. However, aware of the importance of safeguarding human life at sea and the growing demand of sea rescue, the High Command of the Navy established a separate, specialist arm for the task.

== Organization and operations ==
The Mexican Search and Rescue primary missions are SAR operations within 50 miles of the Mexican coast line, to accomplish search and rescue operations in a timely manner, It utilizes 5 current active Naval Stations. There are two types of Search and Rescue Naval Stations (Estaciones Navales de Búsqueda y Rescate, ENSAR). Type A (Alfa) Naval Stations are equipped with one 47-Foot Motor Lifeboat and two 33-foot Defender-class boats. Type B (Bravo) are equipped with 33-foot Defender-class boats. The first Naval Station to be active was opened on April 6, 2007, in Puerto Vallarta, Jalisco. In total the Maritime SAR unit goal is 19 ENSAR stations—six Type As, and 13 Type Bs.

=== Active ENSAR stations ===
- Puerto Vallarta ENSAR station (Jalisco)
- Ensenada ENSAR station (Baja California)
- Los Cabos ENSAR station (Baja California Sur)
- Huatulco ENSAR station (Oaxaca)
- Isla Mujeres ENSAR station (Quintana Roo)

== Equipment ==
Maritime SAR inventory
Vehicle/system	Note	Origin
SAR ships
47-foot Motor Lifeboat	Equipped with two Detroit Diesel engines	United States
33-foot Defender-class		United States
Helicopters
MD Helicopters MD Explorer		United States
