= Surfboat =

Type of rowing boat

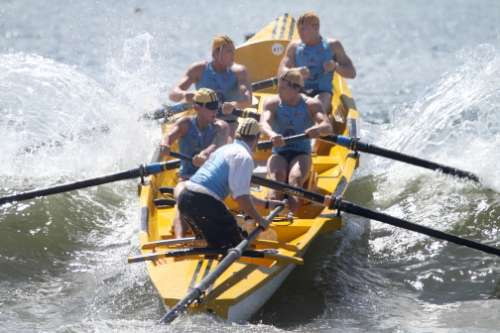
Alexandra Headland Colts Manipulate Shore Break in a surf carnival.

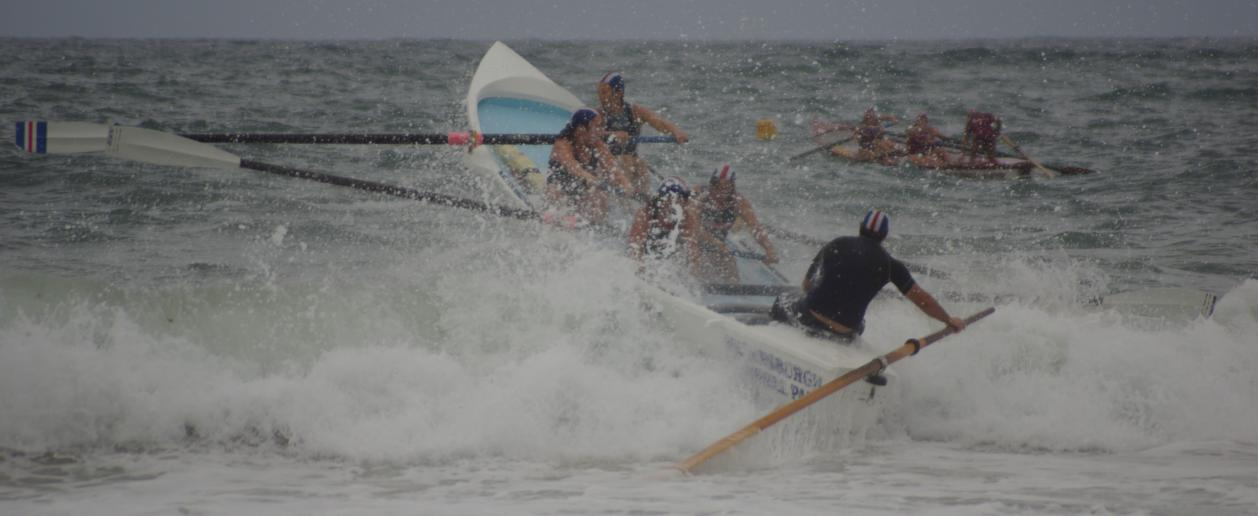
Surf boat passing a breaker.

A surfboat (or surf boat) is an oar-driven boat designed to enter the ocean from the beach in heavy surf or severe waves. It is often used in lifesaving or rescue missions where the most expedient access to victims is directly from the beach.

== Construction ==
The boat building traditions of several countries produced the same basic design when faced with the same problem, that of passing through turbulent whitewater and breaking waves and returning to shore. A broad stern presented to steep and breaking waves when approaching shore can result in broaching (turning sideways to the swell) and swamping or capsizing of the boat. Therefore, surf boats have a pointed stern and usually a fairly marked sheer.

The best-known exception to this double-ended nature of surf boats, is the coble of north-eastern England. Here, the broaching problem was resolved by beaching stern first. The run (the after part of the bottom) was broad, flat and straight so that once the boat had beached, it remained upright. However, beaching the boat was a special skill which involved unshipping the rudder at the right moment. Because they do not fit the usual double-ended pattern, cobles are not normally called surf boats.

Until the 1950s, the most known surfboats were those of Accra, Ghana. Until a port was built, commercial cargoes were landed through the surf by boatmen.

In Tristan da Cunha and Pitcairn Island the surf boats are known as longboats.

== Use ==
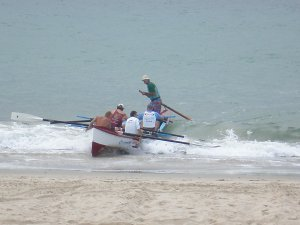
Bribie Island, 2007.

Surf boat rowing is very popular in Australia and New Zealand and to a lesser extent South Africa. Usually associated with Surf Life Saving Clubs, surf boat crews are trained in life saving skills as well as boat handling technique. Powered vessels such as inflatable skiffs and Jet Ski personal watercraft have replaced surf boats as the primary tools for real world rescue efforts, but surfboat training and competition remain popular as recreational activities among both professional rescuers and amateur athletes.

== See also ==
- Surfman Badge
