= Coast Guard Station Golden Gate =

US Coast Guard station in Sausalito, California

United States Coast Guard Station Golden Gate
- Part of Coast Guard Sector San Francisco, District 11
- Marin County, California in United States of America
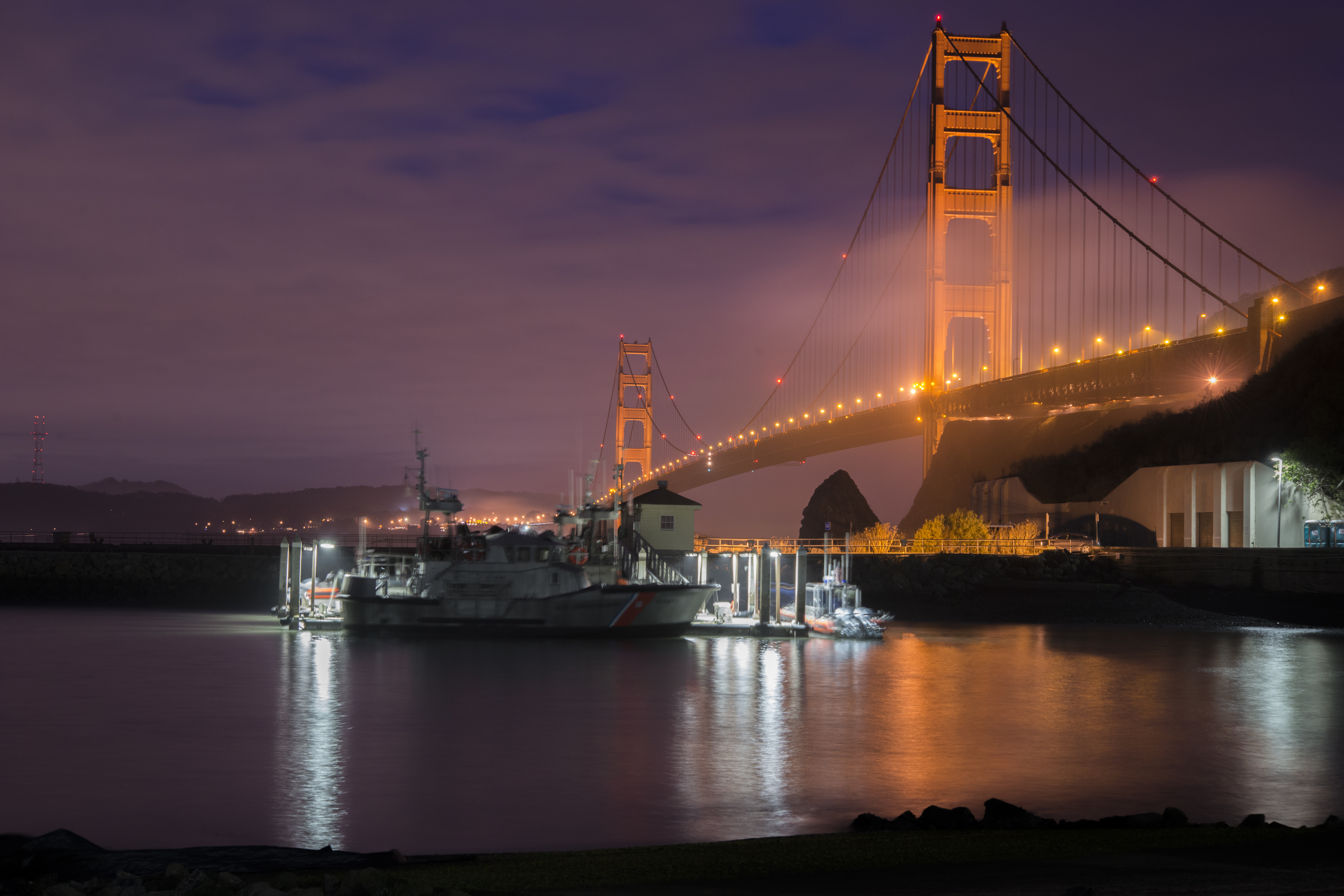
- 47-foot Motor Lifeboat moored in Horseshoe Bay at Coast Guard Station Golden Gate, near the northern end of the Golden Gate Bridge.

Site information
- Type: Coast Guard Station
- Owner: United States Coast Guard

Location
- Coordinates: 37.834090°N 122.477889°W

U.S. Coast Guard Station Golden Gate is a U.S. Coast Guard station in Marin County, California on Horseshoe Bay. It falls under Coast Guard Sector San Francisco in the U.S.C.G.'s District Eleven.

Station Golden Gate is a designated Coast Guard surf station, where surf conditions greater than 8 feet (2.4 m) occur 36 days or more per year; as a surf station, it operates three 47-foot Motor Lifeboats and two 29-foot Response Boats - Small (RB-S).

== History ==
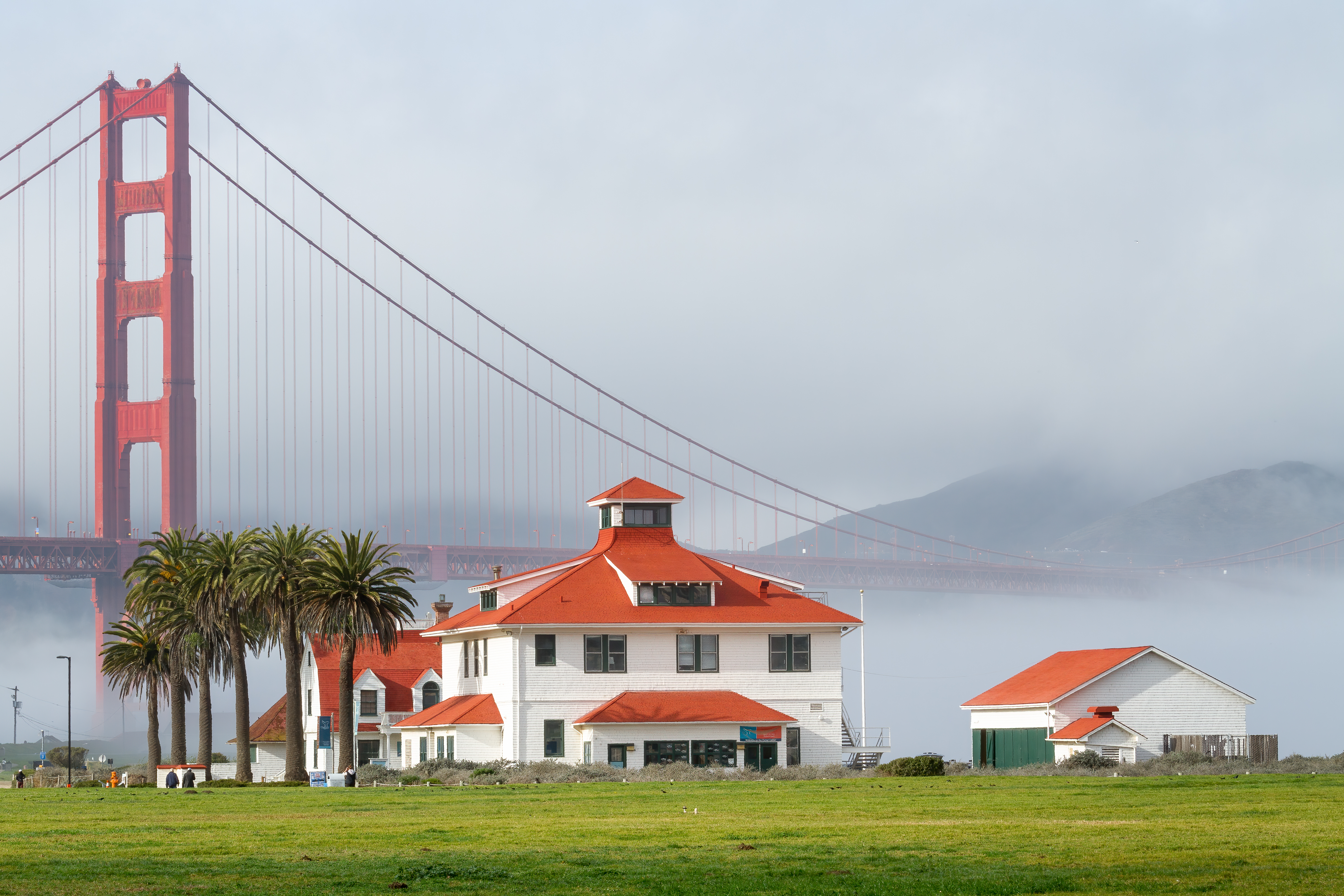
Station Fort Point (2015)

A life-saving station was established in Golden Gate Park on June 20, 1877, which later became the first of five life-saving stations in the Twelfth District of the United States Life-Saving Service. The Golden Gate Park station was later supplemented by stations at Fort Point, Point Reyes, Point Bonita, and Ocean Beach. When the Life-Saving Service merged with the United States Revenue Cutter Service in 1915 to form the United States Coast Guard, the San Francisco and Marin-area stations were gradually consolidated at Fort Point as Coast Guard Station No. 323.

In 1987, an agreement was reached to expand the scope of Station Fort Point, and its equipment and crews were relocated in 1990 to Fort Baker as Station Golden Gate on Horseshoe Bay. It is the busiest search and rescue station on the Pacific coast, averaging over 600 cases per year, with a geographic responsibility extending along the Pacific coast from Point Reyes to Point Ano Nuevo, including the Farallon Islands, and within San Francisco Bay from Bluff Point to Pier 39.

== See also ==
- United States Coast Guard
- Organization of the United States Coast Guard
