= Coast Guard Station Point Adams =

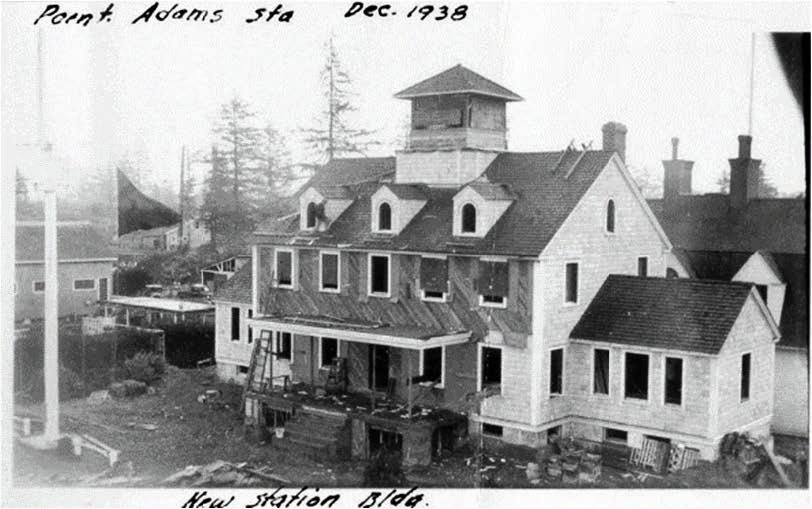
Construction of the main building of the USCG Point Adams Station, in 1938.

Coast Guard Station Point Adams was a United States Coast Guard base at the mouth of the Columbia River. It was founded in 1888, by the United States Lifesaving Service, one of the service that were amalgamated into the Coast Guard.

The original boathouse, barracks, and outbuildings, were built to the Fort Point-type design. During the depression new buildings were built to a design named after then President Franklin Roosevelt.

== Equipment ==
The station's first boathouse held two surfboats, where most other station's boathouse held just a single boat. The boats were mounted on a wagon, which its crew would pull to the best place to launch. Wagons were pushed into the surf for launching.

In the 1930s the base was the home of the Coast Guard's first USCGC Triumph, a 52 feet (16 m) motor lifeboat. This wooden-hulled vessel, and a single sister ship, were bigger than all other motor lifeboats.

== Operational history ==
On January 7, 1913, the USLS Dreadnaught, under the command of Stationkeeper, Oscar S. Wicklund, and the USLS Tenacious, braved 40 feet (12 m) breakers to cross the Columbia Bar to try to rescue survivors from the tanker Rosecrans. The rescued just two survivors, out of a crew of 36. The sea was so heavy both lifeboats capsized, and their waterlogged engines were rendered inoperable, forcing the crew to fall back on oars. Wicklund and Alfred Rimer, the Tenacious's skipper, opted to row to the Columbia River Lightship. Their crew and survivors took refuge there, where the lifeboats were later swept away.

== Retirement ==
The Coast Guard closed the base, and transferred it to a local community college, in the 1960s. It was subsequently transferred to the National Oceanic and Atmospheric Administration, which has employed it as a fishery research centre. Its location at the mouth of the largest river on the US West Coast makes it an ideal site for fishery research.
