= Rabboni (steam tug) =

American 19th century tug boat

History
- Name: Rabboni
- Builder: George Middlemas
- Launched: April 9, 1865, at San Francisco.

General characteristics
- Type: steam tug
- Tonnage: 48.67 regist.
- Length: 100 ft (30.48 m)
- Beam: 23 ft (7.01 m)
- Depth: 9 ft (2.74 m) depth of hold
- Installed power: single cylinder high pressure steam engine; cylinder bore 24 in (61.0 cm) ; stroke 28 in (71.1 cm); reengined in 1900 to compound steeple type engine.
- Propulsion: propeller (8.5 ft (2.59 m) diameter.

Rabboni was a steam tug that operated on the west coast of the United States starting in 1865.

== Career ==
Rabboni was built in San Francisco, California, and launched on April 9, 1865. The tug was brought north to the mouth of the Columbia river, arriving in July 1865, and reaching Portland, Oregon on July 29, 1865. The vessel was commanded by Capt. Paul Corno, who was also its main owner. En route Rabboni had stopped at Coos Bay and procured a three-month supply of coal, and picked up 18,000 board feet of lumber.

On August 10, 1865, Rabboni towed in the bark Almatia, which became the first vessel towed across the Columbia bar by a regular tug. Rabboni was considered a good tug for the time, but ran into opposition at the Columbia from the bar pilots and prejudice among sailing ship owners against steam craft of any kind. In March, 1866 Rabboni proving unable to win sufficient business, was returned to San Francisco.

After many years out of the area, Rabboni was returned to the Pacific Northwest, this time to the Strait of Juan de Fuca, in an effort to pick up tow work from inbound ships headed for ports in Puget Sound. This placed Rabboni in opposition to the powerful Puget Sound Tug Company, and again Rabboni proved unable to compete. There was thereafter no steam tug on the Columbia river bar until 1869.

In 1890, Rabboni came under the ownership of F.B. Cornwall. By 1898 Rabboni had been laid up for some time at the Stetson and Post lumber mill in Seattle. The Klondike gold rush created a great demand for shipping, which resulted, as one historian as written, in “large number of old vessels pulled off the mudflats and out of backwater sloughs from Oakland Creek to British Columbia." Rabboni was one of these vessels, and was refitted for tow work in Alaska, but proved to be unsuccessful.

== Reconstruction ==
In 1900, Rabboni, still owned by F.B. Cornwall, was rebuilt, and a new compound steeple-type steam engine was installed. Rabboni was last used in service for the Bellingham Bay Improvement Company, whose lumber mills were controlled by Cornwall.
