= Boatswain's mate (United States Coast Guard) =

US Coast Guard job classification

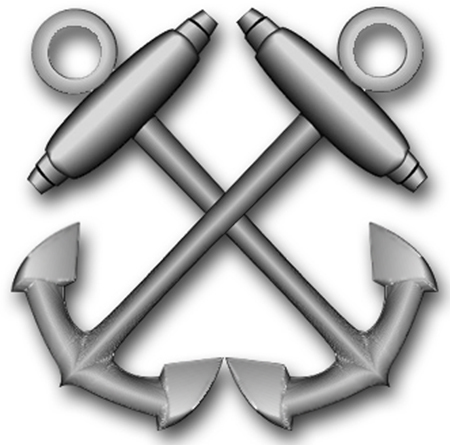
The rating badge for boatswain's mate, two crossed anchors

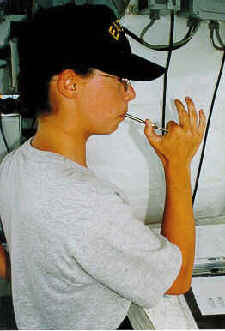
U.S. Coast Guard Boatswain's Mate 3rd Class Jessica Walsh sounding a boatswain's pipe, June 1998

A boatswain's mate is a position in the United States Coast Guard. A boatswain's mate is a versatile role, with those holding the role expected to be capable of nearly any job in a Coast Guard vessel. The tasks include deck maintenance, navigation duties, and navigation. They can also take the helm of a ship when needed.

== Types of duty ==
BMs are found in nearly every duty station available throughout the United States and various locations overseas. They serve on every Coast Guard cutter, from harbor tugs to sea-going icebreakers. They work in navigation, small boat operations, deck operations, crane and pulley systems, search and rescue, deck maintenance, and small arms. Additionally, in many assignments BMs act as boarding team members (BTM) or boarding officers (BO). BMs are Officers in Charge of patrol boats, tugs, small craft, and small shore units including search and rescue stations in addition to aides to navigation teams. BMs use their leadership and expertise to perform the missions of the Coast Guard, at sea and on shore.

== Description of training ==
Training for boatswain's mate is accomplished with 14 weeks of training at Training Center Yorktown in Yorktown, Virginia. Once training is completed, BMs may go on to other advanced training including coxswain, tactical coxswain, pursuit coxswain, heavy weather coxswain, or surfman.

== See also ==
- Boatswain
- Boatswain's mate (US Navy)
- Coxswain § United States Coast Guard
