= Columbia Bar =

System of bars and shoals at the mouth of the Columbia River

Coordinates: 46°15′N 124°02′W

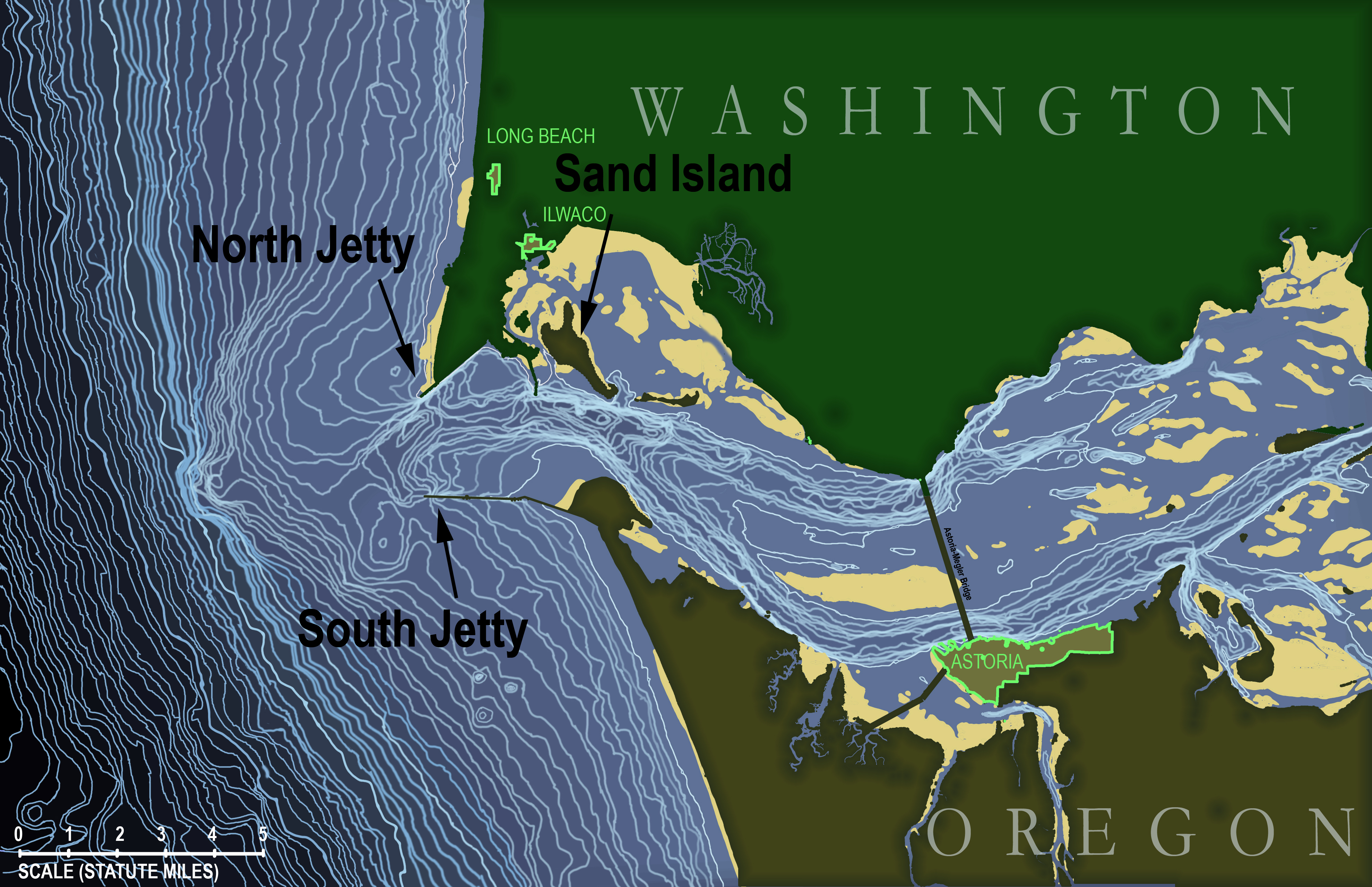
Bathymetric map of the Columbia River mouth: isobaths at five-foot (1.5 m) intervals, 15–310 feet (4.6–94.5 m). Sandbars in yellow.

The Columbia Bar is a system of bars and shoals at the mouth of the Columbia River spanning the U.S. states of Oregon and Washington. It is one of the most dangerous bar crossings in the world, earning the nickname Graveyard of the Pacific. The bar is about 3 miles (5 km) wide and 6 miles (10 km) long. The Columbia River Bar Pilots, based in Astoria, Oregon, assists vessels navigating the bar.

== Description ==
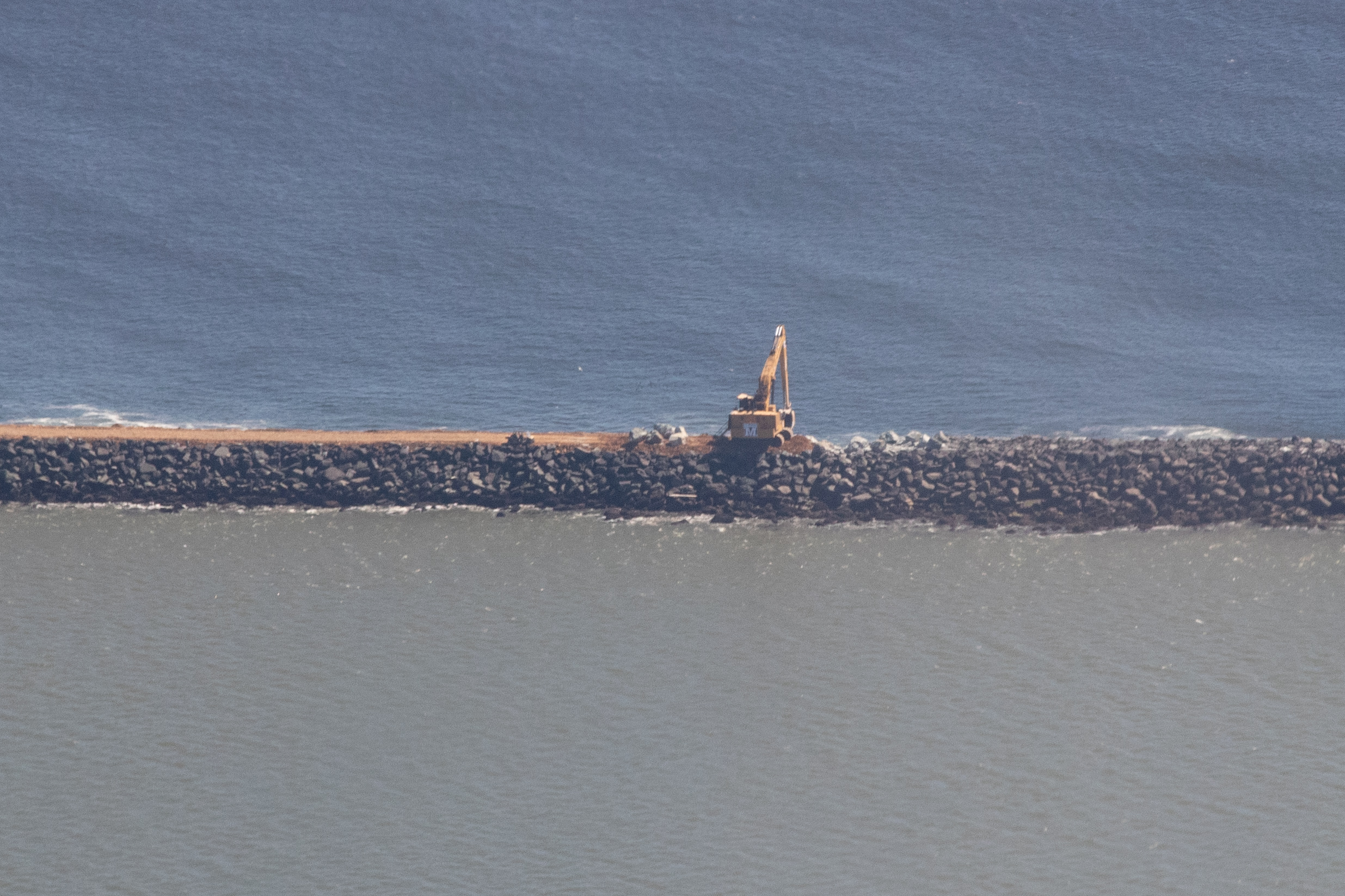
South Jetty of the Columbia River under repair in 2022. Repairs on the south jetty stretched from 2019 to 2025.

The bar is where the river's current dissipates into the Pacific Ocean, often as large standing waves. The waves are partially caused by the deposition of sediment as the river slows, as well as mixing with ocean waves. The waves, wind, and current are hazardous for vessels of all sizes. The Columbia current varies from 4 to 7 knots (7.4 to 13.0 km/h) westward, and therefore into the predominantly westerly winds and ocean swells, creating significant surface conditions. Unlike other major rivers, the current is focused "like a fire hose" without the moderating effect of a river delta. Conditions can change from calm to life-threatening in as little as five minutes due to changes of direction of wind and ocean swell. Since 1792, approximately 2,000 large ships have sunk in and around the Columbia Bar, and because of the danger and the numerous shipwrecks the mouth of the Columbia River acquired a reputation worldwide as the graveyard of the Pacific.

The navigational channel is 2,640 feet (805 m) wide at the west end and narrows to 600 feet (183 m) within the jetties (though the jetties themselves are never closer than two miles (3.2 km) apart). The channel is dredged to 55 feet (17 m) in the northern three-quarters and 48 feet (15 m) for the southern quarter. Inside the bar, the channel remains 600 feet (180 m) wide and reduces to 43 feet (13 m) deep. The Clatsop Spit juts into the ocean on the south side of the river mouth, and on the north side is Peacock Spit, named after the USS Peacock which wrecked there in 1841.

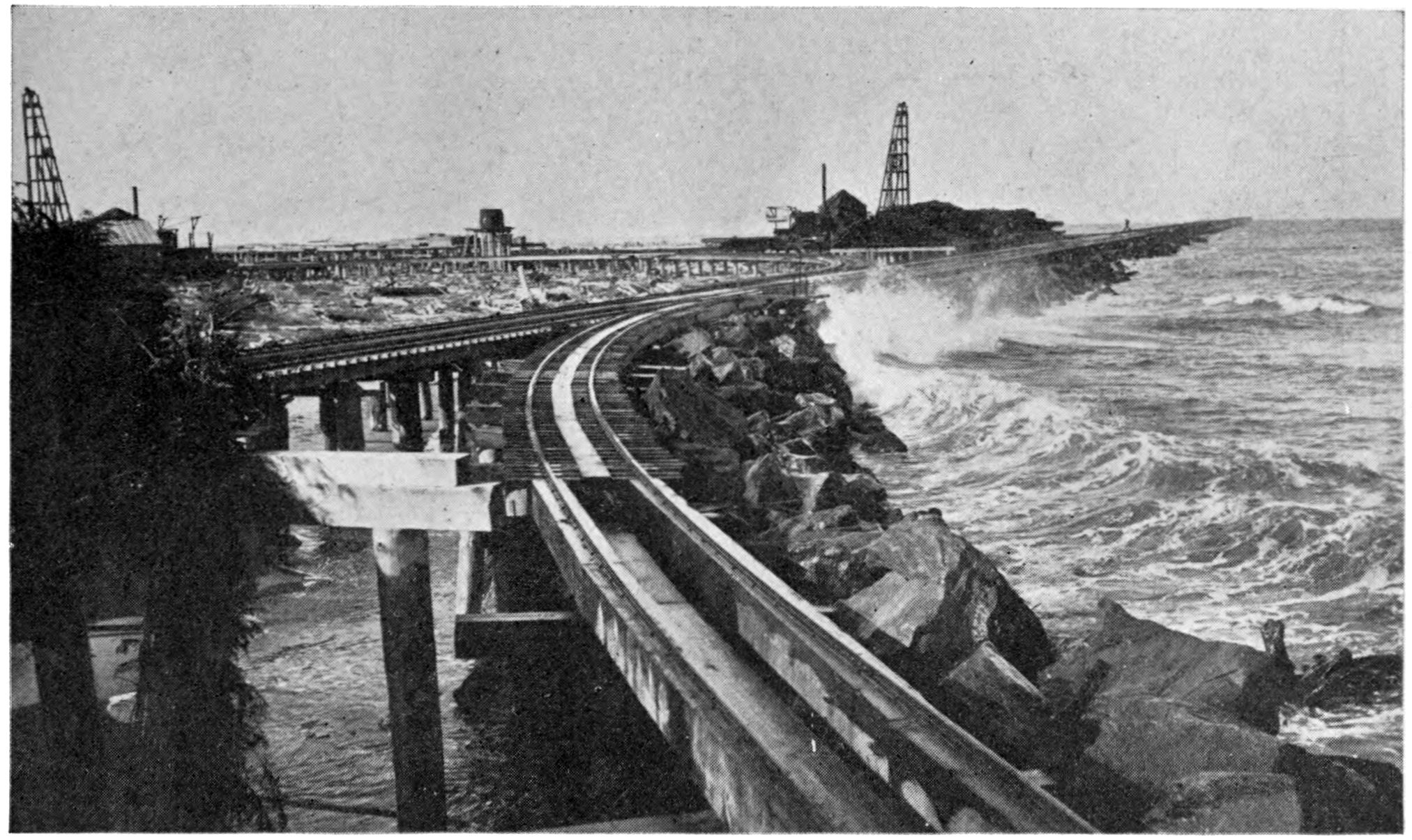
Described as "the longest jetty in the world" in the 1894 volume of The Overland Monthly.

In 1884, after decades of shipwrecks, the U.S. Army Corps of Engineers built the south jetty to keep the channel navigable. In 1914, the north jetty was added. The third and final Jetty A was constructed later, with the modern system in place by 1939. The three jetties were repaired by the U.S. Army Corps of Engineers and private contractors between 2016 and 2025.

The nearby United States Coast Guard Station Cape Disappointment, Washington, operates in some of the roughest sea conditions in the world, and is home to the National Motor Lifeboat School. It is the only school for rough weather and surf rescue operation in the US, and is a center for heavy boat operations.

Approximately 16 bar pilots, earning about $180,000 per year, guide ships across the bar, often boarding ships by helicopter. They generally consider "the bar" to be the area between the north and south jetties and Sand Island (see detail of bathymetric map for locations of these). Over 700 people have drowned in the Columbia Bar and Bar Pilots are highly skilled and trained in navigating ships through the rough waters.

The Columbia Bar is part of a set of major marine coastal hazards along the Pacific Northwest coast, including Cape Flattery at the northwest tip of the Olympic Peninsula and Cape Scott, which is at the north tip of Vancouver Island. Historically, the region's mariner's nickname was the Graveyard of the Pacific, and it is studded with thousands of shipwrecks. The "Graveyard" also includes the rocky, rugged shoreline of the west coast of Vancouver Island, the shores of the Olympic Peninsula, and the Strait of Juan de Fuca.

== Viewing ==
The most accessible place to watch ships cross the bar is at the South Jetty viewing platform at Fort Stevens State Park located near Warrenton, Oregon. This is also the north end of the Oregon Coast Trail. A more dramatic view can be found by hiking the steep 0.75-mile (1.21 km) trail to the Cape Disappointment Lighthouse at the Cape Disappointment State Park located in Ilwaco, Washington.

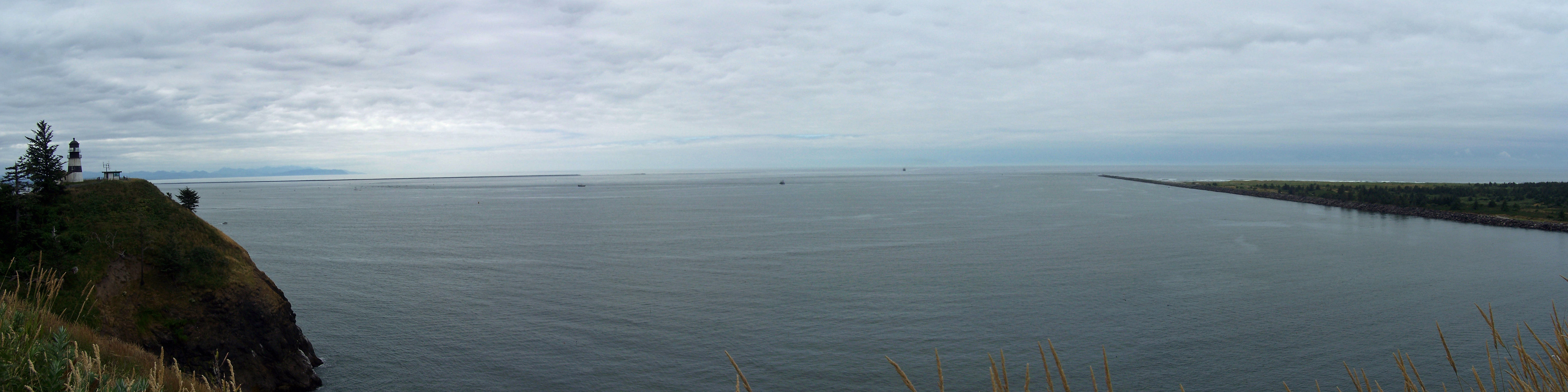
Panorama of the Columbia River's mouth from near the Cape Disappointment Lighthouse

== See also ==
- King & Winge (bar pilot boat from 1924 to 1958).
- U.S. lightship Columbia, historic navigational aid into the Columbia River.
- Rabboni, first regular steam tug to bring a ship across the Columbia bar.
- SS Iowa, wrecked on Columbia Bar in 1936.
- Rosecrans, wrecked on Columbia Bar in 1913.
- Siuslaw jetties, similar to the jetty construction near the Columbia bar
