= Coast Guard Station Cape Disappointment =

Coast Guard search and rescue station in Washington state

Station Cape Disappointment
- Near Ilwaco, Washington in the United States
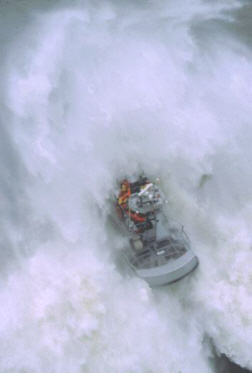
- A 47' MLB in heavy surf

Site information
- Type: U.S. Coast Guard Station
- Owner: Department of Homeland Security
- Operator: United States Coast Guard
- Controlled by: 13th District
- Condition: Operational

Location
- Location within North America Location within the United States Location within Washington (state)
- Coordinates: 46°16′49.8″N 124°2′45.6″W

Site history
- Built: 1877; 149 years ago
- In use: 1877–present

United States Coast Guard Station Cape Disappointment, situated near Cape Disappointment, Washington, at the mouth of the Columbia River, is the largest United States Coast Guard search and rescue station on the Northwest Coast, with 50 crewmembers assigned. Cape Disappointment Station is also the site of the oldest search and rescue station within the Thirteenth Coast Guard District. The station's Area of Responsibility reaches from Ocean Park on the Washington Coast south to Tillamook Head on the Oregon Coast.

== Overview ==
=== Equipment ===
The station has nine search and rescue boats, including the 52-foot (16 m) motor lifeboat Triumph II (52'-SPC-HWX), two 47-foot (14 m) motor lifeboats (47'-MLB), and two 29-foot (8.8 m) Defender class response boats (25'-RBS). The 52'-SPC-HWX and the 47'-MLB have all been designed for operations in heavy surf conditions and are capable of being rolled over by breaking swells and re-right themselves with minimal damage.

=== Facilities ===
Also colocated with the station is the oldest lighthouse on the Northwest Coast of the United States, Cape Disappointment Light, marking the north side of the Columbia River Bar. Less than two miles (3 km) to the northwest is North Head Light, which provides a beacon for the northern approaches to the Columbia River Bar.

=== Mission ===
The station's primary missions include providing search and rescue to commercial and recreational mariners within 50 nautical miles (93 km) of the Columbia River entrance and providing a maritime law enforcement presence near the approaches to the Columbia River including execution of homeland security missions.

Commonly known as Station Cape "D", station crewmembers respond to 100-200 calls for assistance every year. The station's heaviest workload occurs during the months of early June through mid-September, when an abundance of recreational boaters transit the Columbia River entrance in search of salmon and bottom fish.

This area is regarded as one of the most treacherous river bars in the world. Because of the large number of shipwrecks near the river entrance it is often called "The Graveyard of the Pacific." During winter storms, wind-driven ocean swells often reach a height of 20–30 feet (6–9 m) at the entrance of the bar. With the combination of strong outgoing tides and large incoming swells, large surf conditions can exist in and around the bar entrance.

== History ==
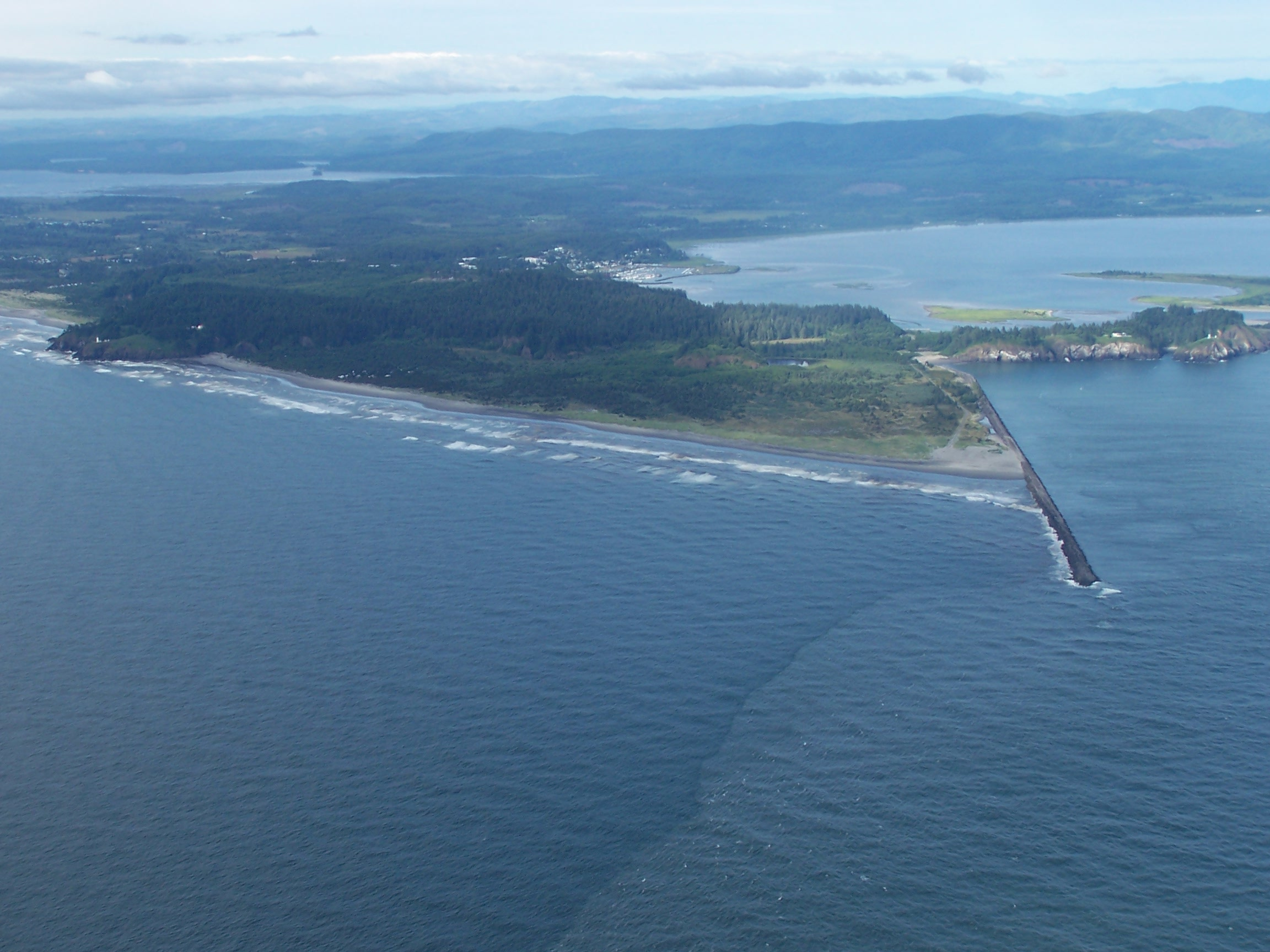
Cape Disappointment; the Pacific Ocean is in the foreground, and the mouth of the Columbia is to the right

The Cape Disappointment headland was first charted as "San Roque" by a Spanish explorer named Bruno de Heceta while exploring the Northwest Coast in August 1775. Heceta recognized this was probably the mouth of a large river but was unable to explore the entrance, since his crewmembers were weak, suffering from scurvy.

Using Heceta's navigational charts during an expedition along the West Coast of North America in 1788, Lieutenant John Meares of the British Royal Navy attempted to locate "San Roque." After exploring the area, Lt. Meares decided that no river entrance or channel existed among the shoals at the base of "San Roque" so Lt. Meares changed the name of the rocky headland to Cape Disappointment, a name that has described the headland since July 1788.

Captain Robert Gray first accomplished crossing the bar several years later on May 11, 1792, aboard the Columbia Rediviva. Gray and his crewmembers successfully crossed the treacherous bar and anchored in Baker Bay to trade goods with the Chinook Indians who populated the region. The river was named in honor of this first passage.

The first U.S. Life-Saving Service station at Cape Disappointment was built on the site of Fort Canby in 1877. For the first five years the station was staffed entirely by volunteers. In 1882, the first full-time Life Saving Service crew was sworn in at this site. Then in 1915, the Life Saving Service merged with the Revenue Cutter Service to form the United States Coast Guard. The station moved to the current site in 1920; the existing station was first occupied in February 1967 and is currently the site for Station Cape Disappointment and the National Motor Lifeboat School.

== National Motor Lifeboat School ==
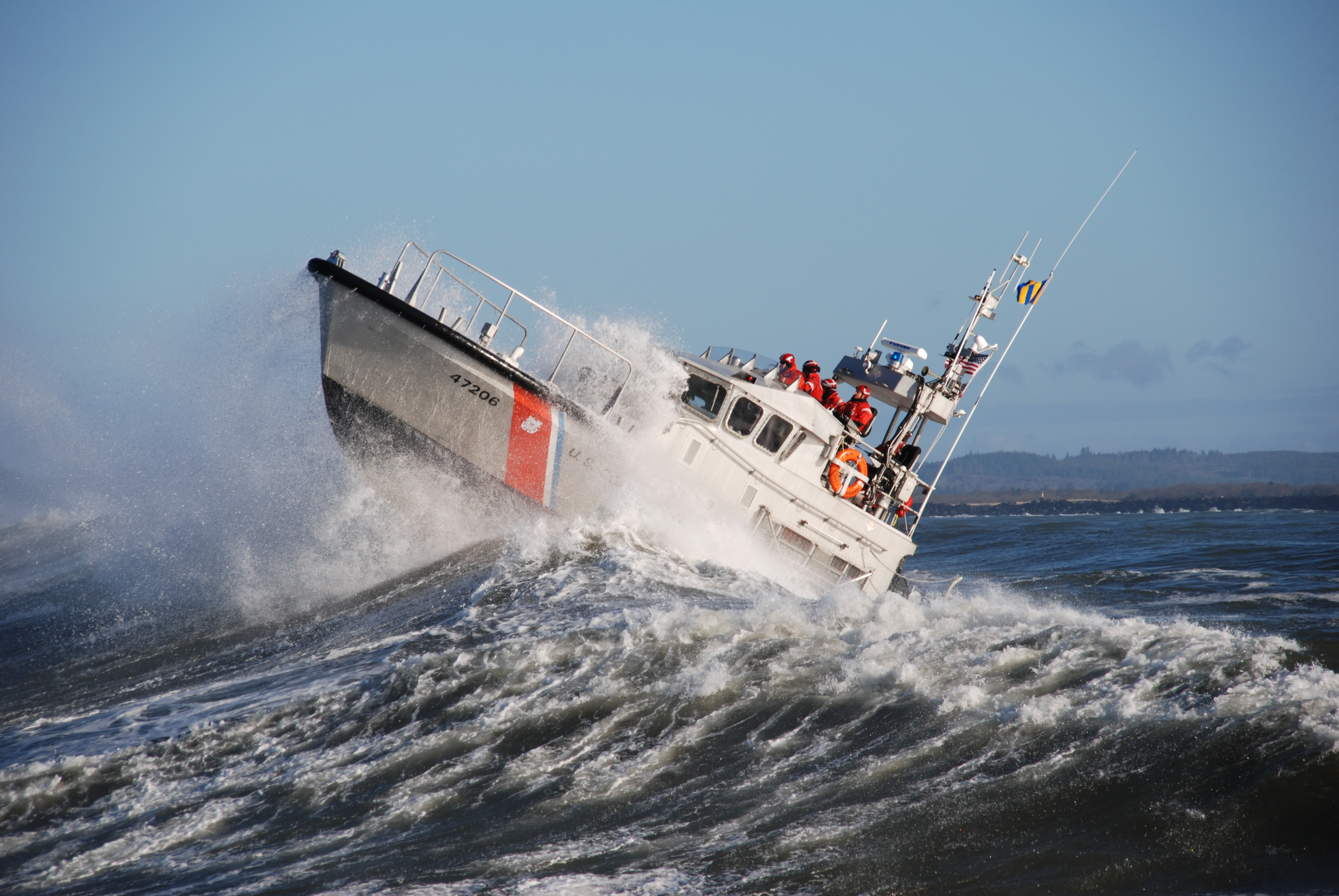
47' MLB CG-47206 practicing in heavy surf near Cape Disappointment with students from the National Motor Lifeboat School (2011)

The National Motor Lifeboat School (NMLBS) was established in 1968 at Cape Disappointment and provides introductory and advanced training for Coast Guard personnel who are seeking to become qualified operators of surf boats through a mixture of classroom instruction and practical experience. When the school began, training was conducted aboard the 44-foot motor lifeboat which since have been succeeded by the 47-foot motor lifeboats. Although the MLBs are designed to be self-bailing and self-righting after rolling or pitchpoling, the NMLBS curriculum provides instruction on how to avoid those situations, as injuries and damage are inevitable when they occur.

The Coast Guard chose Cape Disappointment as the site for the NMLBS due to the prevailing inclement weather. The fall and winter seasons experience the most extreme weather conditions.

USCG surf boat operator classifications are, in increasing order of required ability and training, Coxswain, Heavy Weather Coxswain, and MLB Surfman; once a student has graduated from the heavy weather course, it may take up to six years of active search-and-rescue activities to gain the required experience to qualify for Surfman training. In general, there are fewer than 100 qualified Surfmen in the Coast Guard. 18 petty officers are accepted to the Surfman program per year.
