= Graveyard of the Pacific =

Stretch of North American coastline

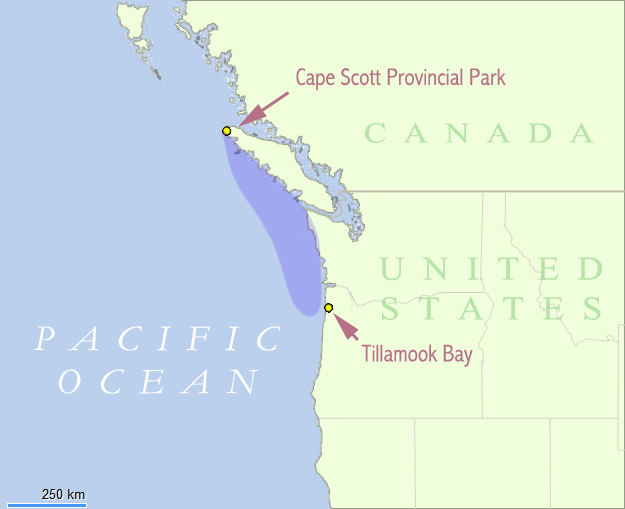
One interpretation of the "Graveyard of the Pacific"

The Graveyard of the Pacific is a somewhat loosely defined stretch of the Pacific Northwest coast stretching from around Tillamook Bay on the Oregon Coast northward past the treacherous Columbia Bar and Juan de Fuca Strait, up the rocky western coast of Vancouver Island to Cape Scott.

Unpredictable weather conditions, including storms and fog, and dangerous coastal characteristics, including shifting sandbars, tidal rips, and rocky reefs and shorelines, have caused thousands of ships to wreck in the area since European exploration of the area began in earnest in the 18th century.

More than 2,000 ships have wrecked in the area, with more than 700 lives lost, near the Columbia Bar alone. One book lists 484 wrecks at the south and west sides of Vancouver Island.

Although major wrecks have declined since the 1920s, several lives are still lost annually.

Among its particularly dangerous landmarks are the Columbia Bar, a giant sandbar at the mouth of the Columbia River; Cape Flattery; the reefs and rocks lining the west coast of Vancouver Island; and the Strait of Juan de Fuca.

Salvage attempts are often unsuccessful or of limited success. Physical wreckage is usually minimal due to the age of many wrecks, the unpredictable weather and sea conditions, and the extensive damage often suffered by vessels at the time they were wrecked.

The term is believed to have originated from the earliest days of the maritime fur trade. It reflects not only the danger of shipwrecks but also the state of open or near-warfare in the area between Russia, Spain, Great Britain, and local Indigenous groups.

== See also ==
- Clallam
- Graveyard of the Atlantic
- Graveyard of the Great Lakes
- Inside Passage
- Lightship Columbia
- List of Oregon shipwrecks
- New Carissa
- SS Pacific
- Peter Iredale
- Puget Sound Mosquito Fleet
- Ripple Rock
- Sechelt
- Steamboats of the Oregon Coast
- SS Valencia
- West Coast Trail, built in 1907 to facilitate the rescue of shipwrecked survivors along the coast

== Sources ==
- Hayes, Derek (1999). Historical Atlas of the Pacific Northwest. Sasquatch Books. ISBN 1-57061-215-3. LCCN 99-10945.
- Pethick, Derek (1976). First Approaches to the Northwest Coast. J. J. Douglas Ltd. ISBN 0-88894-056-4. LCCN 76-48398.
