= 47-foot Motor Lifeboat =

Standard lifeboat of the United States Coast Guard

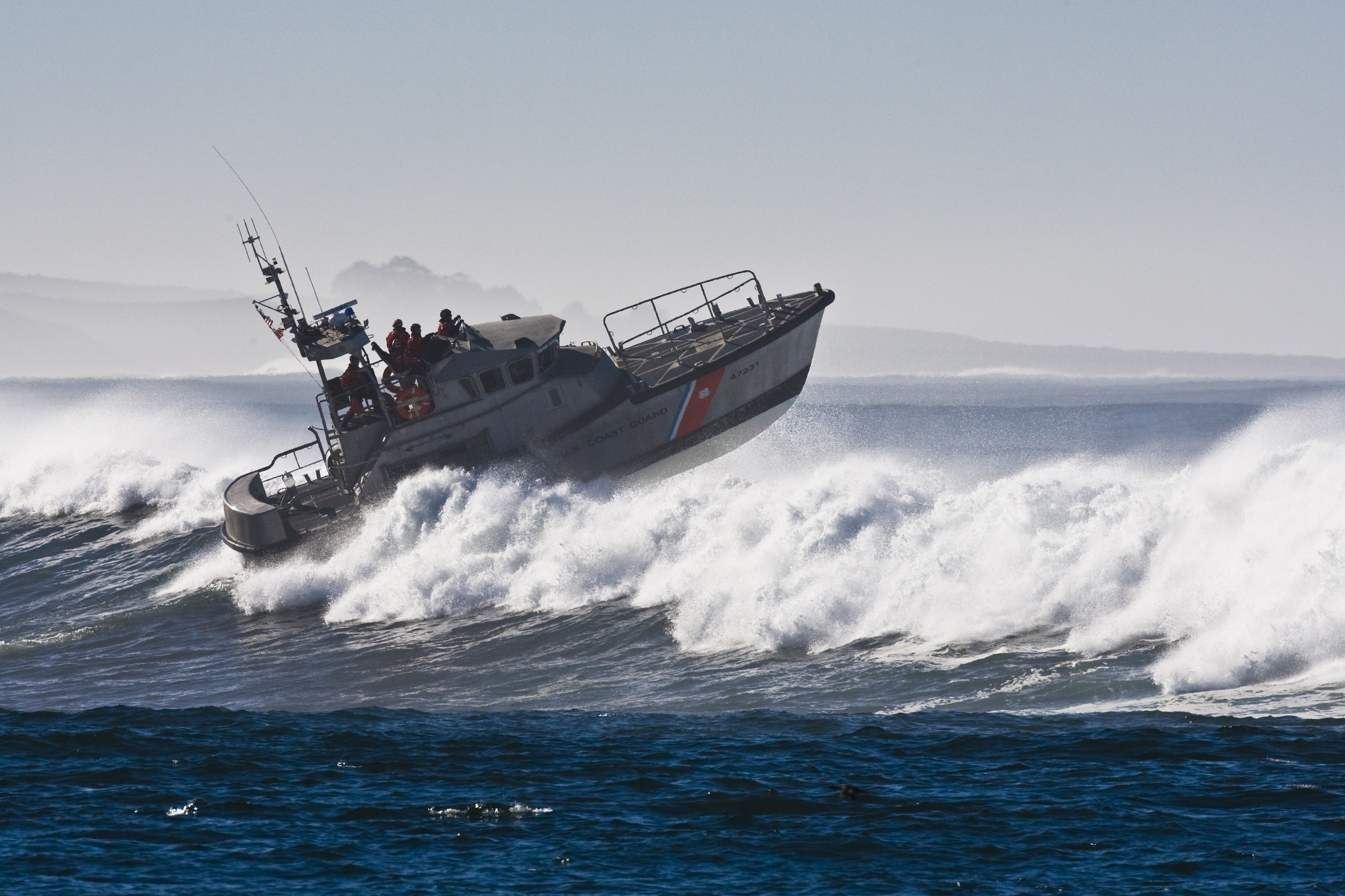
- CG-47231, a USCG 47' MLB in the surf zone off the coast of Morro Bay

Class overview
- Name: 47′ MLB
- Builders: Textron Marine
- Operators: United States Coast Guard; Maritime Search and Rescue (Mexico)
- Preceded by: 44-foot motor lifeboat
- Cost: $1,214,300
- In service: 1997–present
- Planned: c. 227
- Completed: 227
- Active: 227

General characteristics
- Displacement: 18 t (20 short tons)
- Length: 14.6 m (47 ft 11 in)
- Beam: 4.27 m (14 ft 0 in)
- Draft: 1.37 m (4 ft 6 in)
- Propulsion: 2 × Detroit Diesel 6V92TA DDEC-IV engines, 435 hp (324 kW) each; 1,500 L (400 US gal) usable fuel capacity
- Speed: 25 knots (29 mph; 46 km/h) maximum; 22 knots (25 mph; 41 km/h) cruising
- Range: 200 nmi (370 km) cruising
- Complement: 34 persons, 4 crew, 30 passengers
- Armament: 1 × M240B machine gun (optional)

The 47-foot MLB is the standard lifeboat of the United States Coast Guard (USCG). The 47′ MLB is the successor to the 44′ MLB, which were in service from 1963 until 2009.

== Design ==
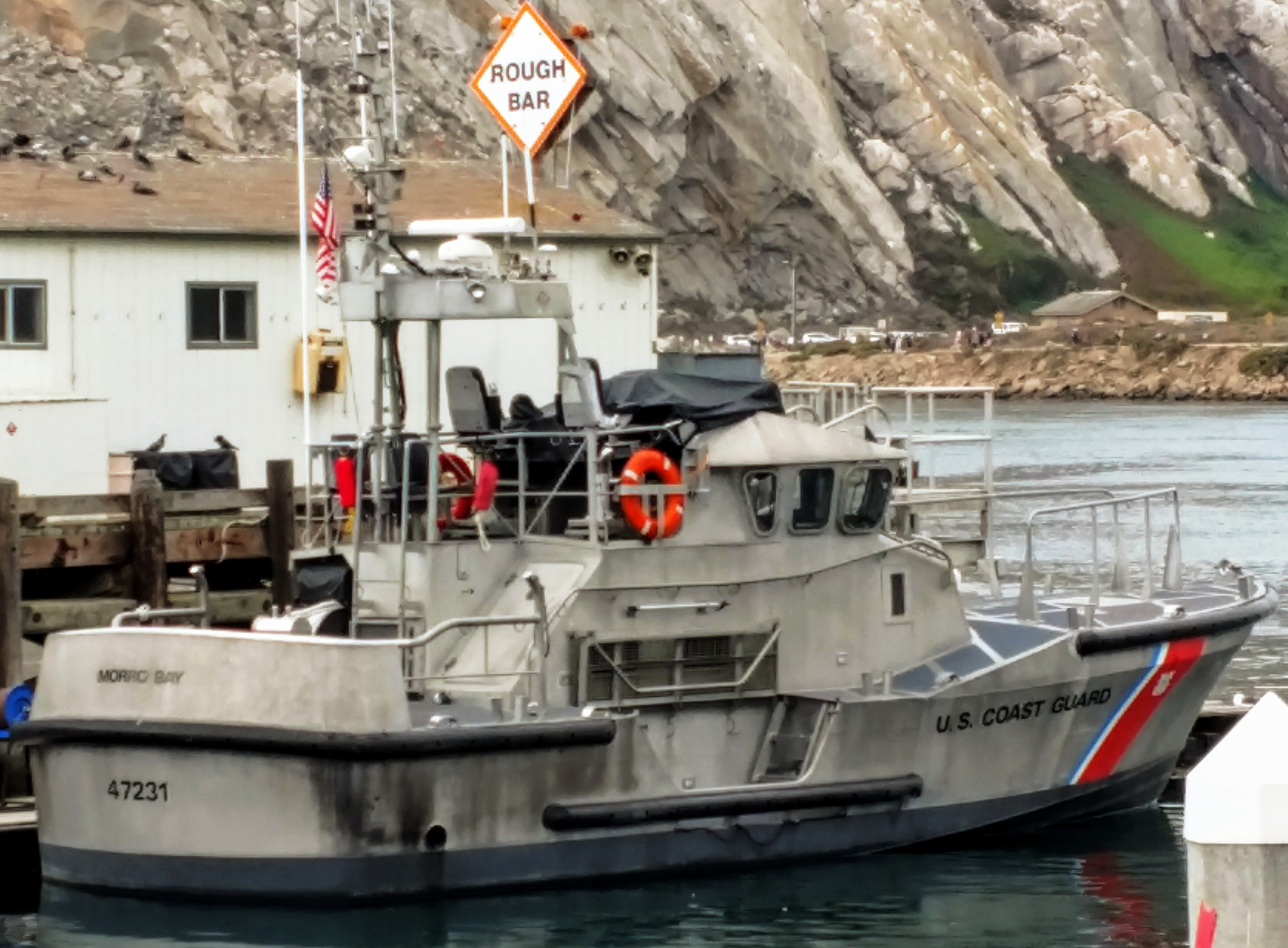
A 47' MLB ready for deployment at Motor Lifeboat Station Morro Bay, California

The 47′ MLB is designed to weather hurricane force winds and heavy seas, capable of surviving winds up to 60 knots (110 km/h), breaking surf up to 6 m (20 ft) and impacts up to three G's. If the boat should capsize, it self-rights in less than ten seconds with all equipment fully functional.

The boat's hull and superstructure are constructed entirely from 5456 marine grade aluminum. Designed with a hard chined deep "V" planing hull, the 47′ MLB exceeds its hull speed. The frame is composed of 17 vertical bulkhead frames, each of which is welded to the deck and hull, and five of which are watertight.

For the international version, Textron have modified the design slightly to use Caterpillar C12 diesel engines with Tier I emissions.

Employing "fly-by-wire" control systems, the boat can be operated from four different locations: two from the enclosed bridge, and two amidships from an open bridge. Because of the fly-by-wire system, the boat is controlled by joysticks instead of wheels.

Situated less than 1 ft (30 cm) above the water line are recessed retrieval wells, allowing for easier recovery of persons and jetsam, and easier boardings. A watertight survivor's compartment is equipped for comprehensive first aid. It is situated at the combined center of rotation of the ship. If needed, a light machine gun can be fitted at the front of the vessel.

== Operating history ==
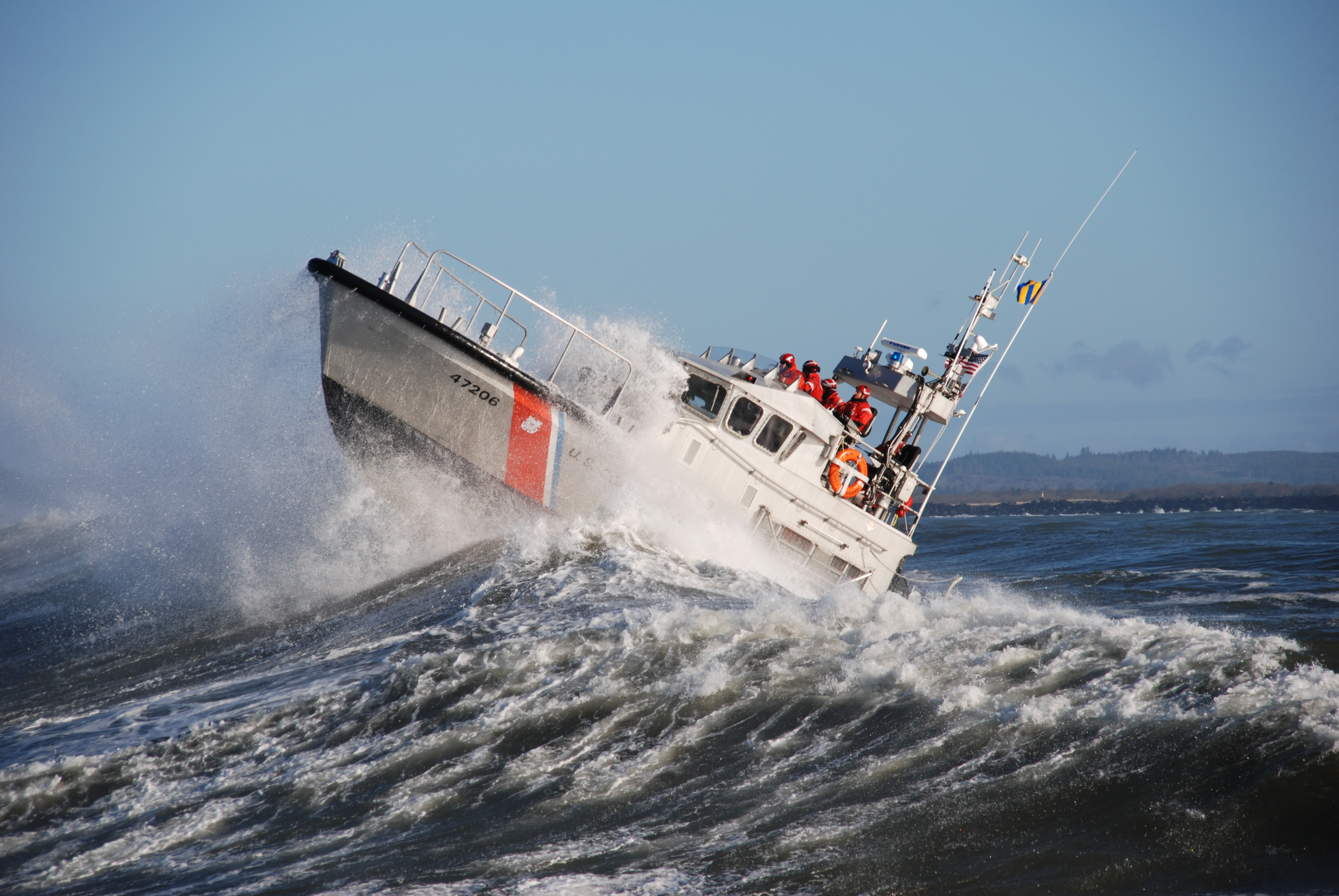
First production 47' MLB, CG-47206, practicing near the mouth of the Columbia River with students from the National Motor Lifeboat School (2011)

Textron Marine & Land Systems was awarded the prototype construction contract in 1988 and the first prototype was assigned hull number CG-47200, entering service in 1990, followed by the pre-production boats (CG-47201 through CG-47205), which were delivered in 1993 and 1994. After Textron was awarded the production contract in 1995, the first production MLB, CG-47206, was delivered in 1997. By 2003, Textron had delivered 117 47' MLBs to the USCG.

Textron also has been awarded international contracts for the 47' MLB from Egypt (2002, three delivered in 2005) and Mexico (2008, six delivered by 2011).

At Station Chatham where the 47-foot boat would draw too much to get over the bar, the 42-foot Near Shore Lifeboat was designed to replace the 44' MLB. The 42-foot near shore lifeboat were decommissioned in 2021 and replaced with a pair of 45-foot RB-M craft.

A service life extension program (SLEP) for the 47' MLB will extend their useful life by 20 years to 2047; the first boats to undergo the SLEP were returned in June 2023, and as of 2023, 107 47' MLBs are planned to complete SLEP by 2030. The SLEP contract, which was awarded to Birdon Group in 2019, is being implemented at its facilities in Bellingham, Washington and Portland, Connecticut.

== See also ==
- 41-foot Utility Boat, Large
- 44-foot Motor Lifeboat
- Cape-class motor lifeboat (the 47′ MLB in service with the Canadian Coast Guard)
- Response Boat – Medium
- Trent-class lifeboat—RNLI lifeboat of similar size and performance
