= SS Pendleton =

T2 tanker built in World War II

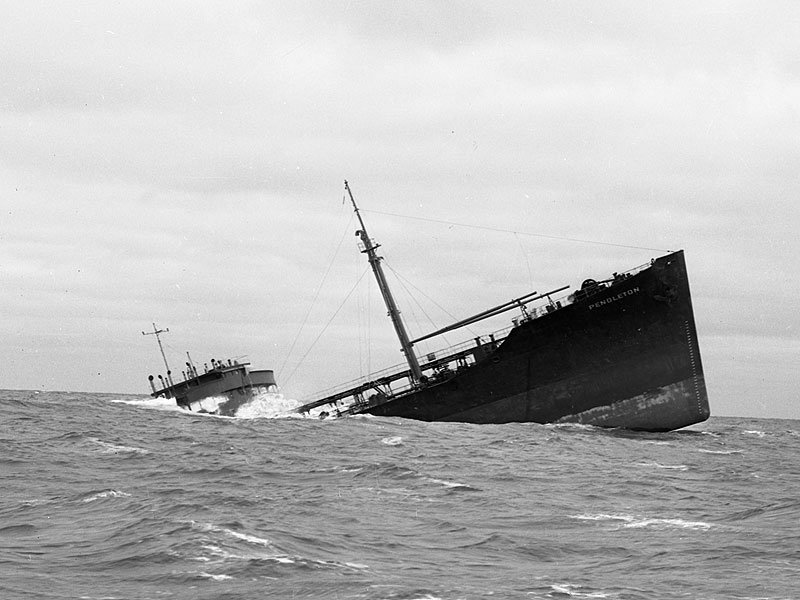
- Bow section of Pendleton aground near Pollock Rip Lightship

History
- Name: Pendleton
- Owner: War Shipping Administration (1944–48); National Bulk Carriers (1948–52)
- Operator: United States Marine Corps (1944–48); National Bulk Carriers (1948–52)
- Port of registry: Portland, Oregon, United States
- Builder: Kaiser Company, Swan Island Shipyard, Portland, Oregon
- Yard number: 49
- Launched: 21 January 1944
- Completed: February 1944
- Out of service: 18 February 1952
- Identification: United States Official Number 245152; Code Letters KWAA
- Fate: Broke in two, subsequently scrapped

General characteristics
- Type: Type T2-SE-A1 tanker
- Tonnage: 10,448 GRT; 6,801 NRT; 16,613 DWT
- Length: 504 feet 0 inches (153.62 m)
- Beam: 68 feet 2 inches (20.78 m)
- Depth: 39 feet 2 inches (11.94 m)
- Installed power: 6,000 hp Steam turbine
- Propulsion: Single-screw propeller
- Speed: 16 knots (30 km/h)
- Crew: 41

SS Pendleton was a Type T2-SE-A1 tanker built in 1942 in Portland, Oregon, United States, for the War Shipping Administration. She was sold in 1948 to National Bulk Carriers, serving until February 1952 when she broke in two in a storm. The T2 tanker ships were prone to splitting in two in cold weather. The ship's sinking and crew rescue (along with the break-up and rescue of its sister ship) is the topic of the 2009 book The Finest Hours: The True Story Behind the US Coast Guard's Most Daring Rescue by Michael J. Tougias and Casey Sherman. The book inspired the 2016 Disney-produced film The Finest Hours with Chris Pine, which focuses on the Pendleton rescue.

== Description ==
The ship was built as yard number 49 by Kaiser Shipyards, Swan Island Yard, Portland, Oregon. Measured at 10,448 GRT, 6,801 NRT, 16,643 DWT, she was 504 feet 0 inches (153.62 m) long, with a beam of 68 feet 2 inches (20.78 m) and a depth of 39 feet 2 inches (11.94 m). Her propulsion was "turbo-electric" (a steam turbine driving a generator that produced electricity to power a motor that drove the propeller shaft). The turbine was manufactured by General Electric of Fitchburg, Massachusetts. It could propel her at a speed of 16 knots (30 km/h).

== History ==
Pendleton was launched on 21 January 1944 and completed in February. She was owned by the War Shipping Administration. Her port of registry was Portland, Oregon. The United States Official Number 245142 and Code Letters KWAA were allocated. During World War II, Pendleton was a member of convoy ON 249, which departed from Liverpool, United Kingdom on 18 August 1944 and arrived at New York City on 2 September.

Pendleton was transferred to National Bulk Carriers of Wilmington, Delaware in 1948. In July 1951, Pendleton ran aground in the Hudson River, New York. She was refloated the next day. The damaged part of the hull would later play a key role in the sinking.

== Loss ==
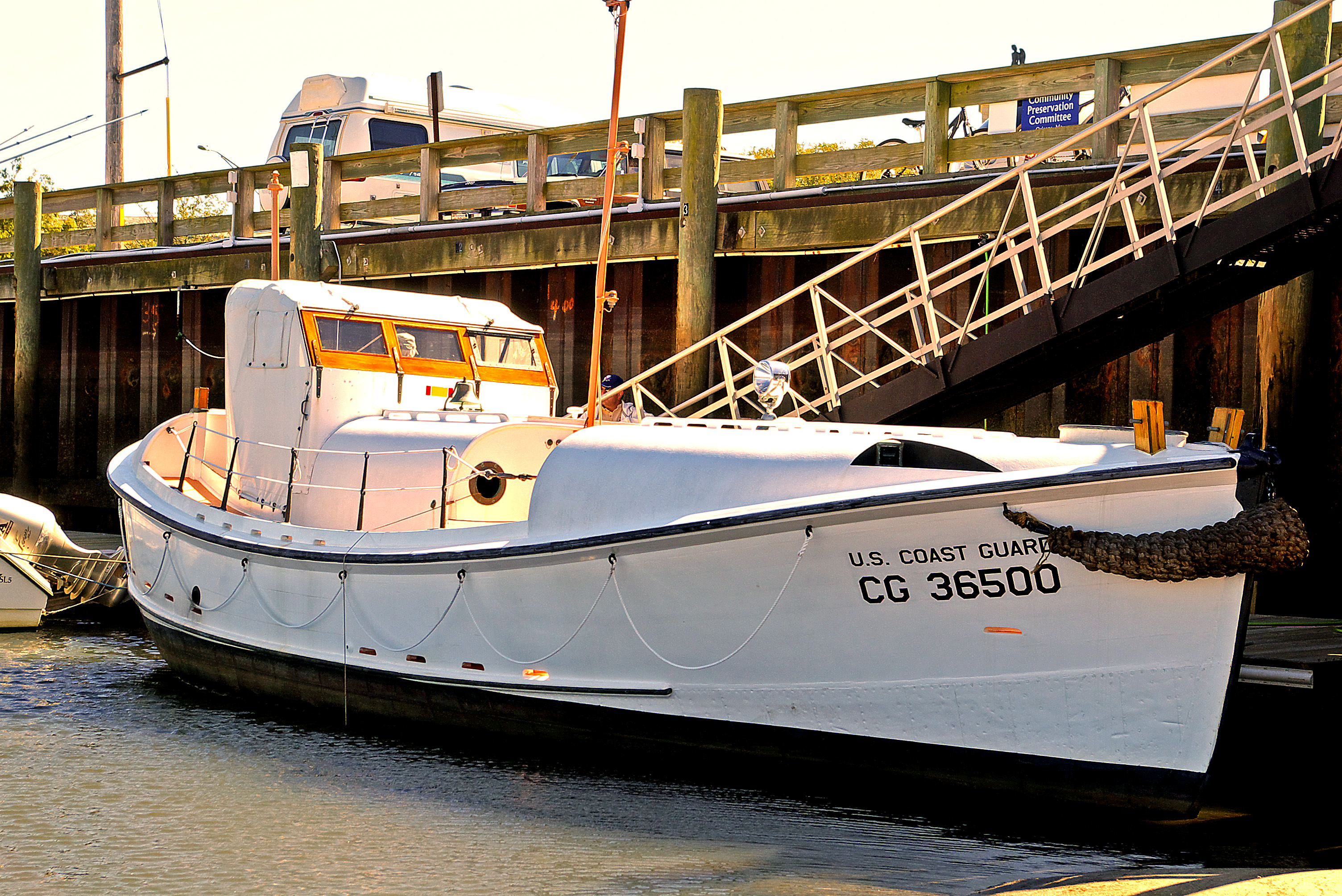
Coast Guard Motor Lifeboat CG 36500 now a museum boat

On 18 February 1952, while en route from New Orleans to Boston, Pendleton broke in two in a gale south of Cape Cod, Massachusetts. The break up happened suddenly when the ship nosed down, and because of which, there was no time to send a distress signal as the radio room in the bow was cut off from power in the stern. A United States Coast Guard Consolidated PBY Catalina aircraft was diverted from searching for another T2 tanker, Fort Mercer, to search for Pendleton, and located both sections. Originally, the Coast Guard believed only Fort Mercer broke in two, since it was able to get an SOS off. It was not until the Catalina plane happened upon the bow that the Coast Guard realized that they were dealing with two ships that had broken in two. The Coast Guard motor lifeboat CG 36500 captained by Boatswain's Mate, First Class Bernard Webber was dispatched by commanding officer Daniel Webster Cluff from the USCG station at Chatham, Massachusetts.

CG 36500 was pounded by waves going over the sandbar out of the harbor, damaging the boat and leaving it without a compass. The crew pressed on and managed to find the stern section of Pendleton anyway, daringly rescuing her crew. Webber carefully maneuvered CG 36500 underneath the listing hull and motored the Coast Guard boat back and forth with the waves while Pendleton's crew lowered themselves down the side with a Jacob's ladder. The crew, timing their descent against the rise and fall of the ocean, jumped from the swaying ladder onto the moving deck of CG 36500 while Webber carefully kept his boat under the ladder but clear of the towering metal wall of the broken-up Pendleton.

Nine of Pendleton's 41 crew were lost: eight (including Captain John Fitzgerald) who were on the bow section (which hadn't been part of the rescue), and the ship's cook (ordinary Seaman George C. "Tiny" Meyers) from the stern section, who had selflessly assisted the rest of the crew off the vessel before himself. He was lost when he jumped from the Jacob's ladder, fell into the ocean, and was crushed to death between the CG 36500 and the Pendleton when the former was hit by a wave and thrown against the ship, killing him instantly. One week later, after its grounding, Pendleton's bow was boarded. Of the eight victims stranded on this section, only one frozen body was recovered, the rest presumed swept overboard.

With the survivors on board CG 36500, a disagreement developed over how to deal with them. Webber eventually decided against attempting to locate and transfer them to USCGC McCulloch, heading for the shore instead. The survivors were safely landed at Chatham.

The rescue of the Pendleton survivors is considered one of the most daring rescues in the history of the United States Coast Guard. All four crew of CG-36500 were awarded the Coast Guard's Gold Lifesaving Medal (rather than just the coxswain, the typical treatment). At the time of her loss, Pendleton was insured for $1,690,000.

The stern ultimately grounded off Monomoy Island, south of Chatham, at coordinates 41°35′10″N 69°57′45″W, where it deteriorated through the years, and now lies underwater, while the bow grounded on Pollock Rip Shoal. The bow section was sold in 1953 to North American Smelting Co. for recycling at Bordentown, New Jersey. However, it was stranded on 4 June 1953 in the Delaware River and dismantled there circa 1978 by the United States Army Corps of Engineers.
