= February 1952 nor'easter =

Winter storm in New England, US

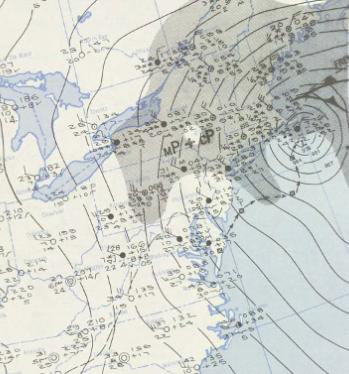
A surface weather analysis of the nor'easter

The February 1952 nor'easter was a significant winter storm that impacted the New England region of the United States. The storm ranked as Category 1, or "notable", on the Northeast Snowfall Impact Scale. Its rapid intensification resulted in heavy snowfall between February 17 and 18, accumulating to 12 to 30 inches (30 to 76 cm). High winds also affected central and northern New England. The nor'easter is estimated to have caused 42 fatalities. In Maine, over 1,000 travelers became stranded on roadways. Two ships cracked in half offshore New England during the storm.

== Development ==
The development of this extratropical cyclone was associated with a pronounced weakening of the usual zonal, or west-to-east, flow which dominates the Mid-Latitudes during the winter, with the jet stream dipping from the latitude of Boston to the latitude of Charleston, South Carolina. The initial low-pressure area originated in the Gulf of Mexico, with a downstream redevelopment offshore Cape Hatteras on February 16. The cyclone deepened rapidly, 25 millibars in 24 hours between February 17 and February 18, while moving just offshore Long Island and southern New England, and dropped heavy precipitation across the central and northern Mid-Atlantic states. The snowfall associated with the storm across eastern New York and southern New England produced the heaviest snows of the winter.

== Impact ==
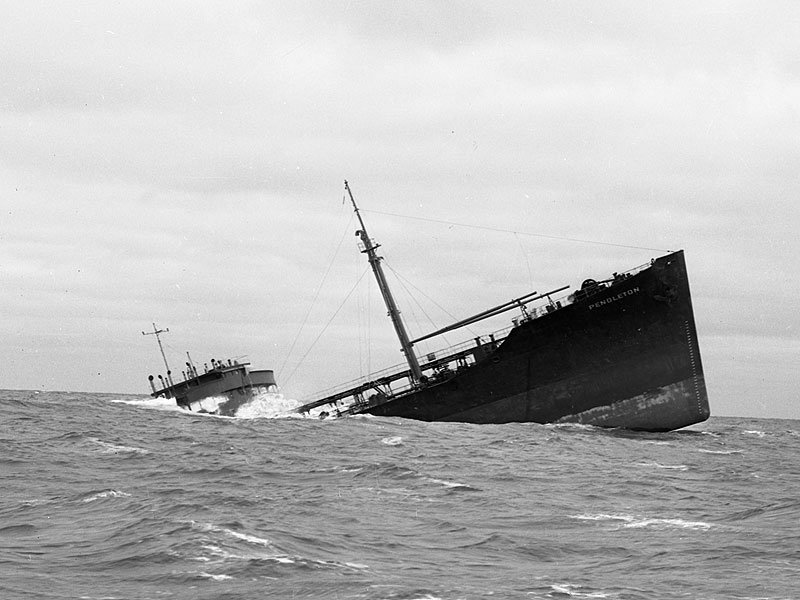
Bow of the Pendleton

There was significant disruption to shipping due to this storm. On February 18, 1952, while en route from New Orleans to Boston, the T2 tanker SS Pendleton' broke in two in a nor'easter south of Cape Cod, Massachusetts. A United States Coast Guard Consolidated PBY Catalina aircraft was diverted from searching for another T2 tanker Fort Mercer to search for Pendleton, and located both sections. At this point, the Coast Guard realized that they were dealing with two ships that had broken in two. The Coast Guard Motor Lifeboat CG 36500 was dispatched from Chatham, Massachusetts. She had four crew on board as the rest of her crew had made themselves scarce on hearing that the 36-foot (11 m) CG-36500 was to be sent out to Pendleton's aid. Nine of Pendleton's 41 crew were lost, eight were on the bow section and the ship's cook from the stern section, who had selflessly assisted the rest of the crew off the vessel before him. He was lost when, as the ship started to slide off a sand bar (that she landed on) by the strong gale-force winds, he jumped from the Jacob's ladder, fell into the ocean, and was struck by the lifeboat as it was hit by a wave, killing him instantly. With the survivors on board, a row developed over how they should be dealt with. Bernard C. Webber, of the CG-36500 decided not to transfer them to USCGC McCulloch and headed for the beach. The survivors were safely landed at Chatham.

The rescue of the survivors of the shipwrecked Pendleton is considered one of the most daring rescues of the United States Coast Guard. All four crew of CG-36500 were awarded the Coast Guard's Gold Lifesaving Medal. At the time of her loss, Pendleton was insured for $1,690,000.

The stern ultimately grounded off Monomoy Island, south of Chatham, and her forepart grounded on Pollock Rip Shoal, at coordinates 41°35′10″N 69°57′45″W, The bow section was sold in 1953 to North American Smelting Co. for recycling at Bordentown, New Jersey. However, it was stranded on June 4, 1953, in the Delaware River and dismantled there c.1978 by the United States Army Corps of Engineers.

== In film ==
The movie The Finest Hours (2016 film) was based on a shipping mishap that occurred during this cyclone.

== See also ==
- Climate of the United States
- List of NESIS storms
