= SS Fort Mercer =

T2 tanker

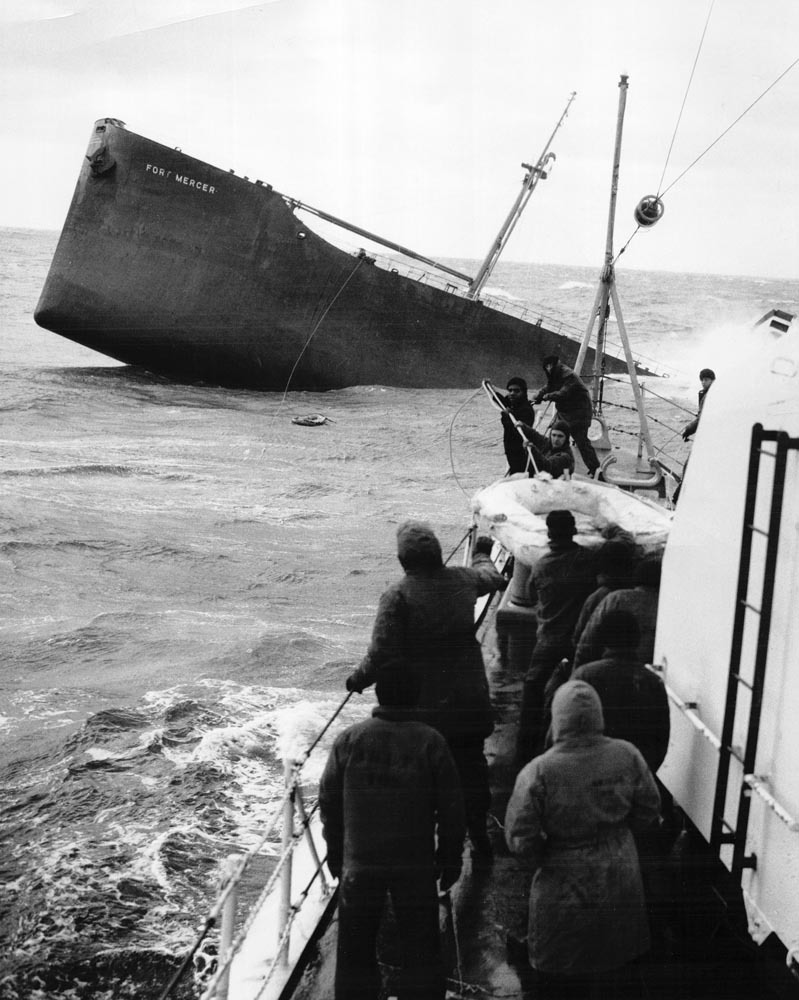
- Crew from USCGC Yakutat pull in a life-raft carrying survivors from the bow section; the photo was taken 20 minutes before its sinking

History

United States
- Name: SS Fort Mercer
- Namesake: Fort Mercer
- Builder: Sun Shipbuilding & Drydock Co., Chester, Pennsylvania
- Laid down: 28 June 1945
- Launched: 2 October 1945
- Acquired: 31 October 1945
- Fate: Foundered 18 February 1952

General characteristics
- Type: T2-SE-A1 tanker
- Tonnage: 10,448 gross register tons (GRT); 16,613 deadweight tonnage (DWT)
- Displacement: 5,782 long tons (5,875 t) light; 21,880 long tons (22,231 t) full
- Length: 523 ft 6 in (159.56 m) (as built)
- Beam: 68 ft (21 m)
- Draft: 30 ft (9.1 m)
- Propulsion: Turbo-electric, single screw, 8,000 hp (5,966 kW)
- Speed: 15 knots (28 km/h)
- Capacity: 140,000 barrels (22,000 m^{3}) (as built)

SS Fort Mercer was a Type T2-SE-A1 tanker built by Sun Shipbuilding & Drydock Co., at Chester, Pennsylvania in October 1945. SS Fort Mercer (hull number 534) was built under a Maritime Commission contract and launched on 2 October 1945. With World War II ending on 15 August 1945, Fort Mercer did not serve in the war. Fort Mercer was owned and operated by the Trinidad Corporation of New York.

== Loss and aftermath ==
On 18 February 1952, Fort Mercer, full of kerosene and fuel oil, first cracked and then broke in two in a gale, 30 miles (48 km) east of Chatham, Massachusetts. Captain Frederick Paetzel radioed out for help, reporting 68-foot (21 m) waves were hitting the ship. When she broke in two, nine officers and crew were on the bow section, and 34 crewmen were on the stern section, with the radio and engine still working. The United States Coast Guard vessels Eastwind and Unimak that were near Nantucket, Massachusetts about 120 miles (190 km) away headed to the two Fort Mercer sections. A Coast Guard PBY aircraft out of Coast Guard Air Station Salem was sent to look for the ship but did not find it. The Coast Guard vessels Yakutat and Acushnet, using liferafts and surfboats rescued four men from the bow. Only five members of Fort Mercer's 44-man crew were lost, all trapped in the sinking bow; one was swept off when the nine men moved from the flooding bridge to the foremost area of the bow. The other four all jumped overboard in an attempt to swim to the rescue ships, and were all swept away. The four remaining men aboard the bow, including the Captain, were rescued using a lifeboat and a life raft, both launched by Yakutat. Minutes after rescuing the last men, the bow capsized and would later be sunk with plastic explosives.

The stern of Fort Mercer, which remained afloat, was found by Eastwind. Several men managed to jump from the stern, and onto the cutter, which pulled alongside it. 13 remained aboard however, and the stern was subsequently towed to Newport, Rhode Island, where the last men safely disembarked. Later, the stern was outfitted with a new bow, and rechristened San Jacinto. The new ship was 41 feet (12 m) longer and expanded from 26 to 29 tanks. The ship again split in half in 1964 and again was rebuilt, renamed this time The Pasadena. The Pasadena was partially salvaged and mostly scrapped in 1983.

In the same storm that broke Fort Mercer in two, SS Pendleton, also a T2 tanker, broke up about 20 miles (32 km) away. Daring rescues by the Coast Guard Lifeboat CG 36500 carried out of Pendleton's stern 32 survivors of 33. After grounding, Pendleton's bow was boarded a week later. Of the eight victims stranded on this section, only one frozen body was recovered.

== See also ==
- Daniel Webster Cluff, United States Coast Guard officer
- The Finest Hours - Movie
