= SS Schenectady =

T2 tanker built during World War II

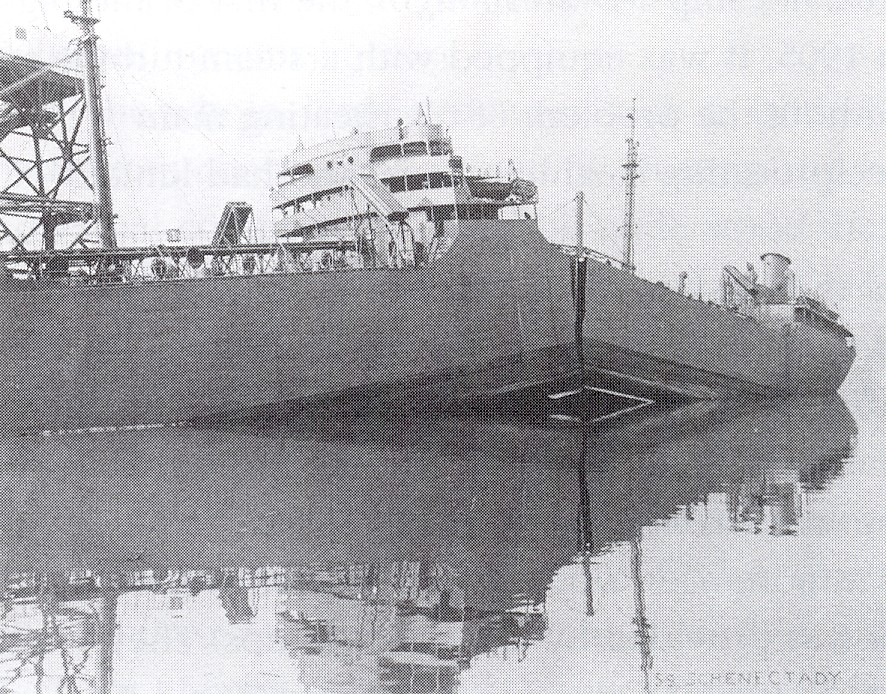
- Schenectady after breaking in two

History

United States
- Name: Schenectady
- Namesake: Schenectady County, New York
- Owner: War Shipping Administration
- Ordered: 24 March 1942
- Builder: Kaiser Company, Swan Island Shipyard
- Cost: $2,700,000
- Yard number: 1
- Laid down: 1 July 1942
- Launched: 24 October 1942
- Sponsored by: Mrs Alex B. McEachern
- Completed: 31 December 1942
- Fate: Scrapped in 1962

General characteristics
- Class & type: T2 tanker
- Type: T2-SE-A1
- Tonnage: 10,448 GRT / 16,613 DWT
- Length: 523 ft (159 m)
- Beam: 68 ft (21 m)
- Installed power: 6,000 hp (4,500 kW)
- Speed: 15 knots (28 km/h)
- Range: 12,600 nautical miles (14,500 mi; 23,300 km)

The SS Schenectady was a T2-SE-A1 tanker built during World War II for the United States Maritime Commission.

The ship was the first tanker constructed by the Kaiser Company's Swan Island Shipyard in Portland, Oregon. The keel of the Schenectady was laid on 1 July 1942, the completed hull launched on 24 October, and was declared completed on 31 December, six months after construction began and two and a half months ahead of schedule.

The ship became moderately famous after it fractured and split on 16 January 1943 while docked in Portland, Oregon. The vessel jack-knifed, hinging on the bottom plate, which had remained intact, and the central part of the ship rose clear of the water. However, she was repaired and continued service without any further damages.

== Hull fracture ==
On 16 January 1943, she was moored at the fitting dock at Swan Island, in calm weather, shortly after returning from her sea trials. Without warning, and with a noise audible for at least a mile, the hull cracked almost in half, just aft of the superstructure. The cracks reached down the port and starboard sides almost to the keel, which itself fractured, jackknifing upward out of the water as the bow and stern sagged to the bottom of the river. Only the bottom plates of the ship held. This was not the first of the war-built merchant fleet to fracture in this way – there had been ten other major incidents, and several more would follow – but it was perhaps the most prominent; it occurred in full view of the city of Portland, and was widely reported in the newspapers even under wartime conditions.

The cause of the fracture was not fully understood at the time; the official coast guard report gave the cause of failure as faulty welding, while the Board of Investigation considered factors as diverse as "locked-in" stresses, sharp changes in climate, or systemic design flaws. Defective welding became the most common explanation for these incidents, especially when later investigations uncovered faulty working practices at some yards, but even then it could only be clearly identified as the case in under half of all major fracture cases. Later research indicated that the failure method was probably a brittle fracture, caused by low-grade steel. This would become highly brittle in cold weather, exacerbating any existing faults and becoming much more liable to fracture.

== Later service ==
She was repaired and successfully entered service in April 1943.

Details of her exact service are unclear, but it is known that she sailed from California on 10 June 1944, possibly for service as a fleet oiler. During the next year, she sailed to Australia, the Persian Gulf, New Zealand, the Marshall Islands, then Curaçao, back through the Panama Canal to the Marshall Islands, the Caroline Islands, the Admiralty Islands and finally Ulithi, before returning home to San Pedro, arriving on 20 May 1945. She participated in battle engagements in the Marshall Islands and at Ulithi.

Following the war, she was transferred to the National Defense Reserve Fleet in July 1946. In 1948, she was sold to the Diodato Tripcovich Shipping Corporation in Trieste, and renamed as Diodato Tripcovich. She was finally scrapped in Genoa in 1962.
