= Bernard C. Webber =

United States Coast Guardsman

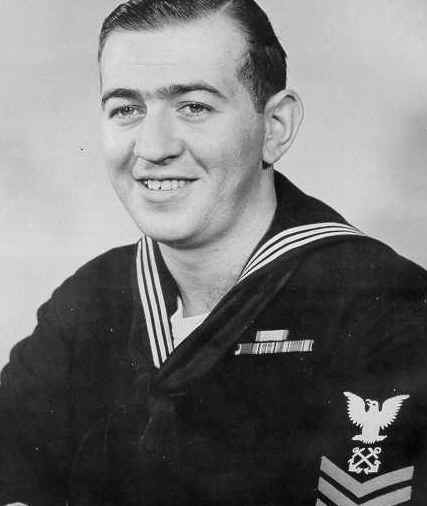
- Born: Bernard Challen Webber; May 9, 1928; Milton, Massachusetts
- Died: January 24, 2009 (aged 80); Melbourne, Florida
- Burial place: Pleasant Hill Cemetery, Wellfleet, Massachusetts
- Spouse: Miriam Penttinen
- Children: Bernard Challen Webber Jr. Patricia Webber
- Military career
- Allegiance: United States of America
- Branch: U.S. Coast Guard; United States Merchant Marine
- Service years: 1946–1966
- Rank: Chief Warrant Officer 4
- Conflicts: World War II; Vietnam War
- Awards: Lifesaving Medal

Bernard Challen Webber (May 9, 1928 – January 24, 2009) was a United States coast guardsman. He was a petty officer assigned to Coast Guard Station Chatham, Massachusetts, where one of his duties was that of coxswain of Coast Guard Motor Lifeboat CG 36500. Webber and his crew of three rescued the crew of the stricken T2 tanker SS Pendleton, which had broken in half during a storm on February 18, 1952 off Cape Cod. Webber maneuvered the 36-foot (11 m) lifeboat under Pendleton's stern as the tanker's crew, trapped in the stern section, abandoned the wreck of their ship on a Jacob's ladder into the Coast Guard motor lifeboat.

== Career ==
Webber and his crew of three – Engineman Third Class Andrew Fitzgerald, Seaman Richard Livesey, and Seaman Ervin Maske – saved 32 of the 33 crewmen who were on the stern section of SS Pendleton when the ship broke in two. There were no survivors among the ship's crew in the bow section, which was found the next day by another rescue vessel. All four Coast Guardsmen were awarded the Gold Lifesaving Medal for their heroic actions. The rescue operation has been noted as one of the most successful in the history of the U.S. Coast Guard.

Webber served in the Merchant Marine during World War II, then joined the Coast Guard in 1946. At the time of the Pendleton rescue Webber was serving as a boatswain's mate first class at Coast Guard Station Chatham. He rose to the rank of Chief Warrant Officer (Boatswain specialty) during a 20-year military career that included a tour during the Vietnam War as a part of Operation Market Time.

== Personal life ==
Webber was born in Milton, Massachusetts, the son of Anne (Knight) and Reverend A. Bernard Webber. He was married to Miriam Penttinen. Webber died on January 24, 2009. He had two children: Patricia Webber Hamilton and Bernard E. Webber.

== Awards ==
- Gold Lifesaving Medal
- Coast Guard Good Conduct Medal
- American Campaign Medal
- World War II Victory Medal
- National Defense Service Medal
- Vietnam Service Medal
- Republic of Vietnam Campaign Medal

== Legacy ==
The first-in-class Sentinel-class cutter, USCGC Bernard C. Webber was named in his honor. She was commissioned on 14 April 2012 at her home port of Miami, Florida.

A history of the rescue of the men of Pendleton and Mercer, including Bernard Webber's heroic role in the rescue of the men from the stern of Pendleton, was presented in the 2009 book The Finest Hours: The True Story of the U.S. Coast Guard's Most Daring Sea Rescue, by Michael J. Tougias and Casey Sherman. This book was later reissued in a "young adult" edition and adapted into a 2016 feature film, The Finest Hours by Walt Disney Studios Motion Pictures, depicting the Pendleton rescue with Chris Pine portraying Webber.

Webber's memoir was published in 2015, titled Lightships, Lighthouses, and Lifeboat Stations: A Memoir and History (ISBN 978-1627340625).

== Additional reading ==
- "Bernard C. Webber, USCG, 1928-2009". Coast Guard Heroes. U.S. Coast Guard Historian's Office. Archived from the original on 20 May 2017.
- Kroll, C. Douglas (2010). A Coast Guardsman's History of the U.S. Coast Guard. Annapolis, Maryland: U. S. Naval Institute Press. ISBN 978-1-59114-433-5.
- Lagan, Christopher (19 March 2010). "First Sentinel Class cutter named for CG hero Webber". Coast Guard Compass. Coast Guard Compass, Official CG Blog. Archived from the original on 26 January 2016.
- Lamothe, Dan (13 July 2015). "The real-life story behind Disney's forthcoming Coast Guard rescue movie, 'The Finest Hours'". Washington Post.
- Tougias, Michael J.; Sherman, Casey (2009). The Finest Hours: The True Story of the U.S. Coast Guard's Most Daring Sea Rescue. New York City: Scribner. ISBN 978-1-4165-6721-9.
- Webber, Bernard C. (2015). Lightships, Lighthouses, and Lifeboat Stations: A Memoir and History. Boca Raton, Florida: Universal Publishers. ISBN 978-1627340625.
- Webster, W. Russell. "A Tribute: Bernie Webber, CWO (Ret.)" (PDF). U.S. Coast Guard History Program. U.S. Coast Guard Historian's Office.
