= SS Jacksonville =

T2 tanker built in World War II

History

United States
- Name: Jacksonville
- Owner: US Merchant Marine
- Operator: US Merchant Marine
- Port of registry: 1943: USA
- Builder: Kaiser Shipbuilding Company
- Cost: $2 million
- Yard number: 45
- Laid down: 4 November 1943
- Launched: 23 December 1943
- Fate: Sank, 30 August 1944

General characteristics
- Type: T2-SE-A1 tanker
- Tonnage: 10,448 GRT
- Length: 441 feet
- Beam: 56 feet
- Installed power: 6000 shp
- Propulsion: Turbo Electric Steam Turbine
- Speed: 11 knots (20 km/h)
- Capacity: 141,000 gal aviation gasoline
- Crew: 78

SS Jacksonville was a Merchant Marine tanker built by the Kaiser Shipbuilding Company at the Swan Island Shipyard in Portland, Oregon in 1943. It was named after the town of Jacksonville in Jackson County, Oregon, United States.

On 30 August 1944, she was sunk by two torpedo hits from U-482, approximately 50 miles (80 km) north of the coast of Ireland. There were only two survivors of the 78 man crew: Marcellus Wegs and Frank Hodges.

Even though the ship was broken in half, it refused to sink. It required ships guns and depth charges from the convoy escorts to sink the rear section. The forward section continued to float for 15 hours.
