= Daniel Webster Cluff =

United States Coast Guard officer

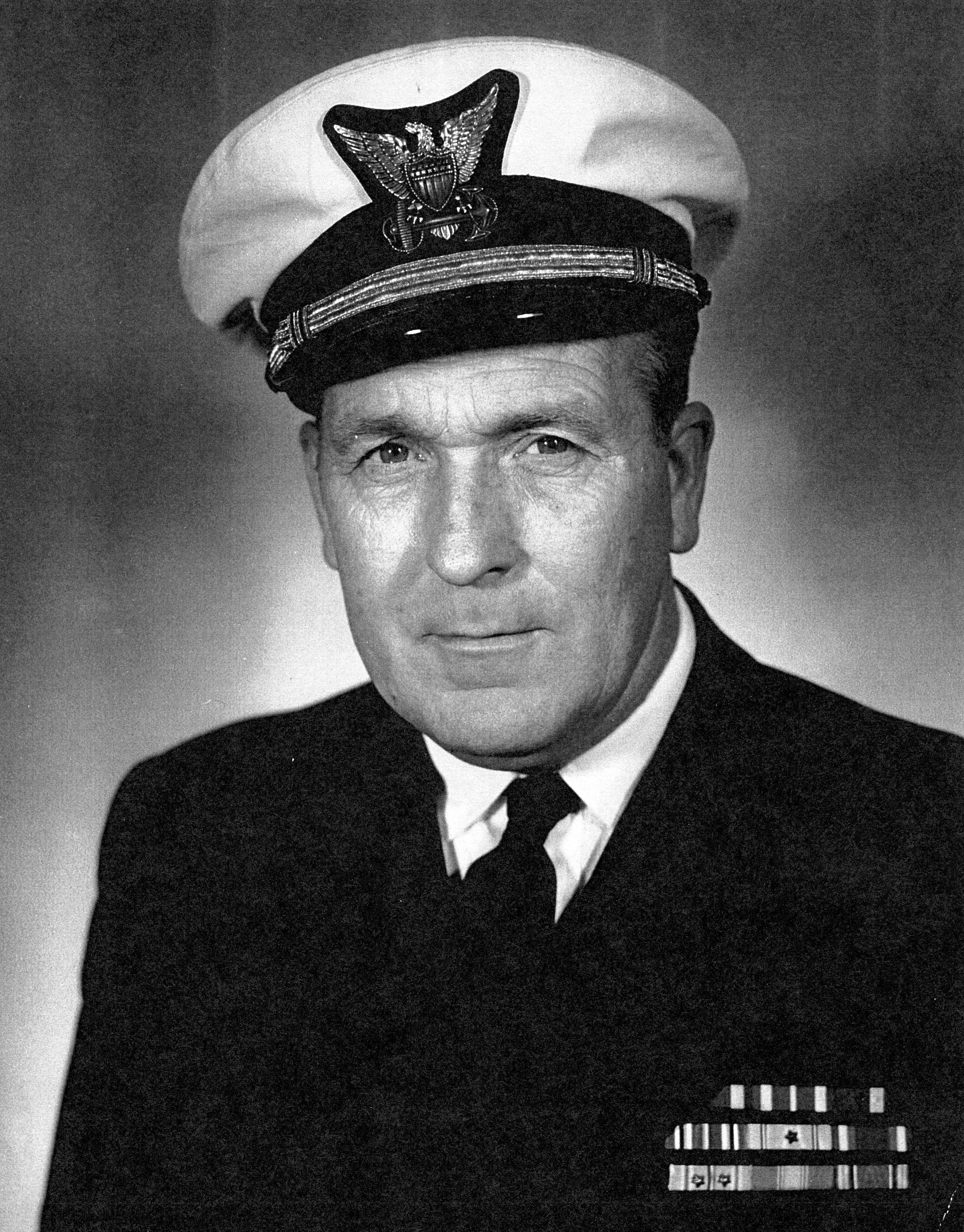
- Born: July 4, 1916; Chincoteague, Virginia, U.S.
- Died: March 5, 1989 (aged 72); Brandon, Florida, U.S.
- Occupation: U.S. Coast Guard officer
- Known for: Leading a remarkable maritime rescue

Daniel Webster Cluff (July 4, 1916 – March 5, 1989) was a United States Coast Guard officer who led one of the U.S. Coast Guard's largest small-boat rescue operations in the midst of a New England winter storm on February 18 through 19, 1952, as Chatham Lifeboat Station's officer-in-charge. Warrant Officer Cluff's expertise in small-boat life-saving operations and confidence in his men's abilities resulted in Coast Guard Motor Lifeboat CG 36500 crew's rescue of thirty-two survivors from the stern section of SS Pendleton "only minutes before it capsized."

The rescue of survivors from SS Pendleton's stern was not the only rescue operation underway by the Chatham station in this storm. Cluff also oversaw the rescue efforts of another Chatham motor lifeboat that spent twenty two hours at sea assisting in several attempts to locate and rescue survivors from the bow of SS Pendleton and SS Fort Mercer. Simultaneously, while coordinating and directing all phases of Chatham's rescue operations, Cluff stayed in communication with the Coast Guard's First District, assisted local fisherman, and maintained cooperative relations with a large number of the press who reported on the rescue from the Chatham Lifeboat Station.

Chatham's rescue efforts during those two days were part of an even larger rescue operation overseen by the Coast Guard's First District that resulted in the rescue of seventy mariners—including those from SS Pendleton's stern—without any loss of life of the eight men from Chatham who risked their lives by heading out to sea in thirty-six-foot motor lifeboats. The media reported on this rescue operation extensively and pressed the Coast Guard for real-time information as rescue operations unfolded.

Cluff, who grew up in the fishing and Coast Guard community of Chincoteague, VA, was the son of a thirty-year career Coast Guardsman. Cluff served 13 years as an enlisted small-boat, life-saving operator and a combat tour in the Pacific as a World War II assault-boat coxswain before his promotion to warrant officer and assignment as officer-in-charge of Chatham Lifeboat Station in 1950.

== Early life and education ==
Cluff was born in Chincoteague, Virginia, and grew up on the water as a Coast Guard dependent. His father was a career Coast Guardsman. After attending high school and business school, Cluff enlisted in the Coast Guard on December 17, 1936, in Chincoteague, Virginia.

== Initial active duty service ==
Cluff began his thirty-year Coast Guard career as a surfman at Parramore Beach Station on Virginia's Eastern Shore, not far from his hometown of Chincoteague, Virginia. He served the first thirteen years of his career operating small boats with a focus on life-saving operations.

== World War II service ==
During World War II, he served on USS McKean as an “assault boat coxswain” for beach-landing boats where he, along with his shipmates, earned a Navy Unit Commendation for their service during “The Guadalcanal Campaign, August 7 to September 5, 1942.” Cluff received three personal citations while serving aboard McKean: (1) “Officially commended by the British Government for work in connection with the rescue of the crew of SS Clan Skene…having been sunk by enemy submarine action on May 10, 1942, in the Caribbean Sea,” (2) “operated with Company D of the First Marine Raider Battalion in operations against the Japanese resulting in the capture of the Island of Tulagi, in the Solomon Island group on August 7-8-9, 1942;” and (3) “operated with units of the First Marine Raider Battalion, in an attack on a Japanese supply base at Taivu Point, Guadalcanal Island on September 8, 1942, resulting in routing the enemy and destroying a large quantity of supplies.”

After returning from duty in the Pacific, Cluff was again assigned to lifeboat stations as a boatswain's mate. During this period he also served a sixteen-month tour on Coast Guard Cutter CG83303, a life-saving operations vessel.

Effective August 8, 1944, Cluff was issued a “permanent appointment as chief boatswain's mate in the U.S. Coast Guard, by reason of meritorious conduct in action against the enemy.” His specialty rating was chief boatswain mate (lifesaving) or BMC(L), which was the highest life-saving boat operator's rating.

== SS Pendleton and SS Fort Mercer rescues ==
In 1950, the Coast Guard promoted Cluff to warrant officer and assigned him as officer-in-charge of the Chatham Lifeboat Station, Chatham, Massachusetts. He served as officer-in-charge of the Chatham Lifeboat Station from September 15, 1950, to July 31, 1952. As the officer-in-charge of Chatham Lifeboat Station, Cluff led the station's rescue operation efforts on the fateful night of Monday, February 18, 1952. Chatham Station and its men made an important contribution to one part of a larger rescue operation led by the Coast Guard First District that would eventually lead to the rescue of seventy men and special recognition for twenty-one Coast Guardsmen.

Chatham Station's rescue operations included the early use of shore-based radar under the skillful hand of Chief Petty Officer William H. Woodman. Woodman and Cluff's use of radar and alert observations “assisted in determining that two tankers, the SS Pendleton as well as the SS Fort Mercer, were in distress….” Rescue operations on Monday had initially focused solely on the troubled Fort Mercer. Neither the Coast Guard nor anyone else ashore knew that Pendleton had broken in two off of Chatham late Monday afternoon.

At about 3:00 pm Monday, they picked up two targets on the radar 5.6 miles off shore., Cluff examined the “targets” through his binoculars and realized these two targets looked like “two ends of a ship” and “[t]hey were drifting apart.” Cluff “reported his find to Coast Guard headquarters, and a plane was dispatched to the Fort Mercer scene to scan the sea off Chatham. The plane confirmed [Cluff's] report. But it wasn't until 4:00 that a further check showed Pendleton over due in Boston and identified the Chatham wreckage as hers.”

With this knowledge in hand, Cluff “timely dispatch[ed] the U.S. Coast Guard Motor Lifeboat No. CG[3]6500 to the scene of the stranded stern section of the PENDLETON [which] was instrumental in the rescue of the thirty-two survivors only minutes before it capsized.” The CG-36500 crew consisted of three men under his command—Boatswain's Mate First Class Bernard Webber, Engineman Third Class Andrew Fitzgerald, and Seaman Richard Livesey—plus Seaman Ervin Maske, who volunteered for the mission even though he was assigned to Stonehorse Lightship and just happened to be at Chatham awaiting transportation to his lightship.

Much earlier that day, at around 12:30 pm, February 18, 1952, Cluff had dispatched Coast Guard Motor Lifeboat CG36383 to assist with rescue operations of Fort Mercer, but what later turned out to be the bow of Pendleton. The crew, led by Chief Boatswain's Mate Donald H. Bangs and consisting of Boatswain's Mate First Class Emery H. Haynes, Seaman Antonio F. Ballerini, and Seaman Richard J. Ciccone, coordinated rescue operations with another lifeboat, Coast Guard cutters and air-sea planes until 10:45pm the following evening. Although this crew did not bring in any survivors, they spent more than twenty-two hours at sea, under grueling conditions in an attempt to rescue potential survivors.

Cluff recommended both crews for awards: the Gold Lifesaving Medal to the crew of CG36500 and the Coast Guard Commendation Medal to the crew of CG36383. These medals were awarded by the Commandant of the Coast Guard in Washington, D.C., on May 14, 1952. Woodman and Cluff were recognized with letters of commendation from the Commandant of the Coast Guard on May 29, 1952, at First Coast Guard District Headquarters, Boston, Massachusetts. Earlier, on April 29, 1952, Jordan Marsh, a large New England retail store, honored these ten men from Chatham with a special ceremony and awarded them Jordan Marsh's “Award of Merit.”

In 2016 Walt Disney Studios Motion Pictures released The Finest Hours, a very loose, fictional depiction of the Pendleton rescue, with Eric Bana portraying a fictional version of the station chief using the same name as Cluff.

== Later active duty career, retirement, and death ==
In July 1952, the Coast Guard selected Cluff to serve as Commander, Coast Guard Group Gloucester, Gloucester, Massachusetts.

Cluff went on to rise to the rank of chief warrant officer, W-4, permanent grade, and to serve as commanding officer of shore units and vessels. He served his last assignment as commander of USCGC Zinnia. Cluff retired on February 1, 1967, after thirty years of active duty service.

A resident of Woodbury Heights, New Jersey, who had been elected to the community's borough council, Cluff died on March 5, 1989, at the age of 72, in Brandon, Florida. He was survived by his wife of over fifty years and their three sons. He is buried in Arlington National Cemetery alongside his wife, Dixie.
