= SS Sackett's Harbor =

1943 T2 tanker

History
- Name: Sackett's Harbor (1943–57); Angelo Petri (1957–70); Californian (1970–75); Sea Chemist (1975–78)
- Owner: War Shipping Administration (1943–56); United Vintners, Inc. (1957–75); Antilles Navegacion S.A. (1975–78)
- Builder: Swan Island Shipyard, Portland, Oregon
- Yard number: 812
- Launched: 5 July 1943
- Completed: August 1943
- Identification: IMO number: 5017462
- Fate: Scrapped in 1978

General characteristics
- Class & type: T2 tanker
- Type: T2-SE-A1
- Tonnage: 10,448 GRT / 16,613 DWT
- Length: 523 ft (159 m)
- Beam: 68 ft (21 m)
- Installed power: 6,000 hp (4,500 kW)
- Speed: 15 knots (28 km/h)
- Range: 12,600 nautical miles (14,500 mi; 23,300 km)

SS Sackett's Harbor was a T2 tanker that was built in August 1943. She served in the United States Merchant Marine during World War II. The ship was a namesake of Sackets Harbor, New York.

Sackett's Harbor survived the war basically unscathed but on 1 March 1946 she was sailing between Yokosuka and Balboa when she broke in half about 800 miles southwest of Adak, Alaska. The bow of the ship was sunk but the stern continued to float. The stern section was able to get to Adak under her own power. The only reported fatalities were two cats.

== Power plant ==
The ship was later towed to Anchorage, Alaska where she served as Anchorage's first major power source. The ship's electric drive supplied about 55% of Anchorage's electricity requirements from 1946 to 1955. In 1955, she was replaced by the Eklutna Dam.

== New bow ==
The ship was given a new bow around 1957 and was rechristened as the SS Angelo Petri. She was fitted with stainless steel tanks and hauled wine for the Associated Vintners from Stockton, California through the Panama Canal to the East Coast.

She was renamed Californian in 1970, and then Sea Chemist in 1975 when she was sold to Antilles Navegacion S.A., of Panama. She was sold for scrapping in early 1978 and was broken up at Vinaròs.
