= Vancouver Shipyard =

Defunct shipyard in Vancouver, Washington, U.S.

Coordinates: 45°36′44″N 122°38′20″W

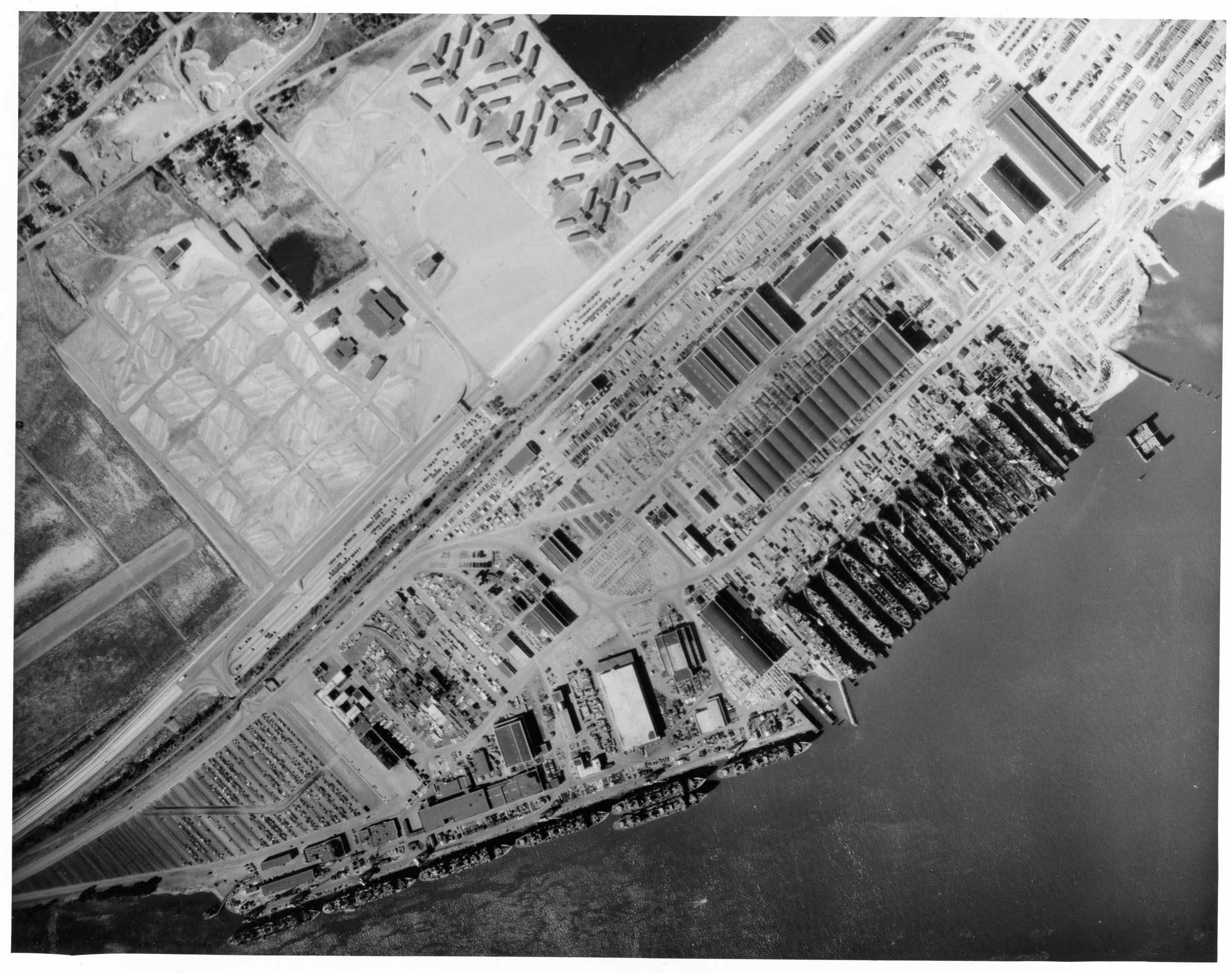
Aerial view of the shipyard in 1945

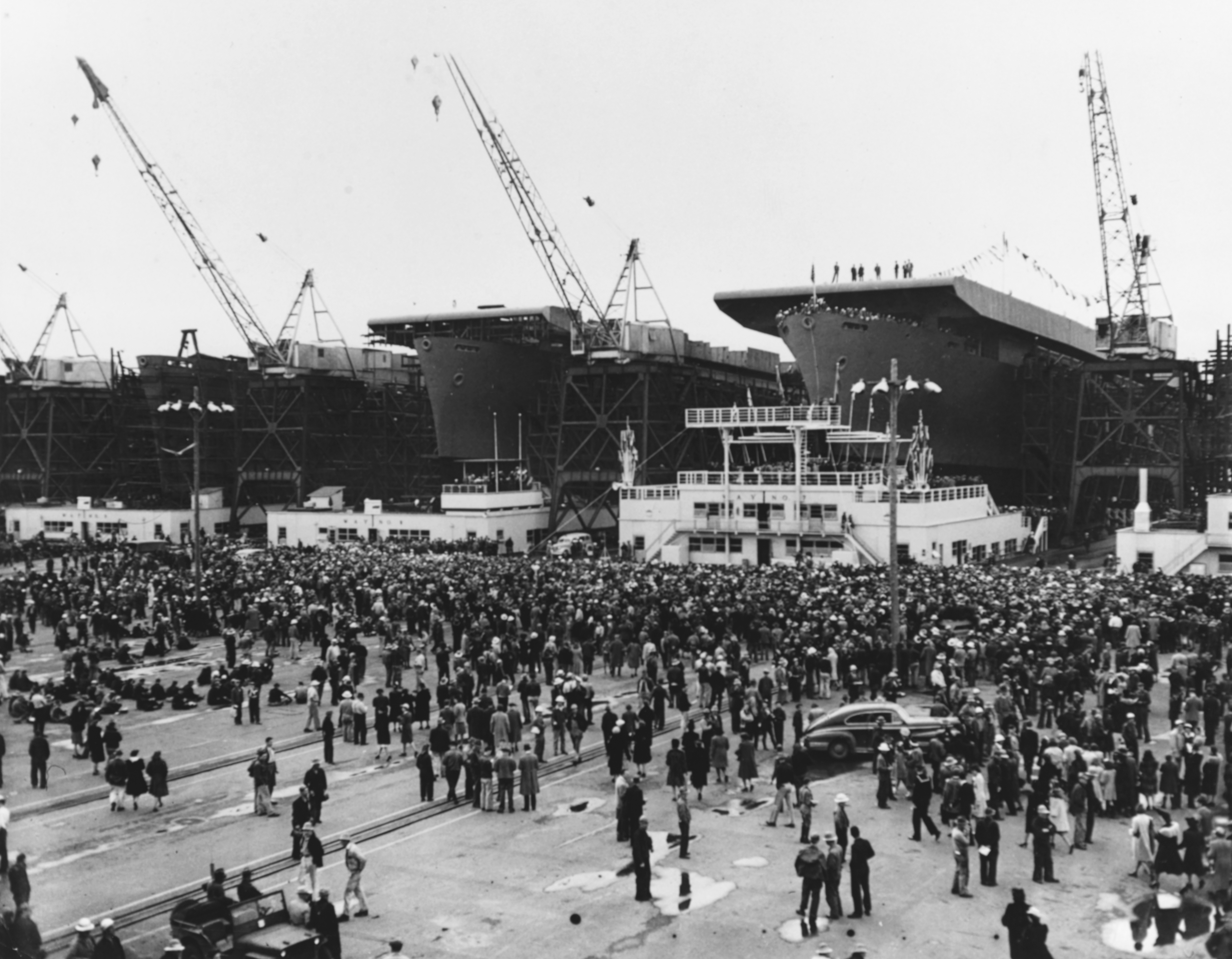
Escort carriers at the shipyard in 1943

The Kaiser Company, Vancouver, commonly known as the Vancouver Shipyard, was an emergency shipyard constructed along the Columbia River in Vancouver, Washington, to help meet the production demands of the United States Maritime Commission in World War II. The shipyard was one of three Kaiser Shipyards in the Pacific Northwest, along with the Oregon Shipbuilding Corporation and the Swan Island Shipyard across the Columbia in Portland, Oregon.

== History ==
The Vancouver yard began production in early 1942 and totaled nearly 200 acres (81 ha). It had an initial payroll of 38,000 workers. The shipyard produced vessels of five different types, with Casablanca-class escort carriers being its biggest production line.

The shipyard's first escort carrier, USS Casablanca, was launched on April 5, 1943.

The shipyard was closed following the end of World War II. In 1960, the shipyard was purchased by Gilmore Steel for $3,279,000.

== See also ==
- Vanport, Oregon – Housing project constructed by the Kaiser Company for shipyard workers
