= The Finest Hours (2016 film) =

2016 film by Craig Gillespie

- Theatrical release poster
- Directed by: Craig Gillespie
- Screenplay by: Scott Silver; Paul Tamasy; Eric Johnson
- Based on: The Finest Hours: The True Story of the U.S. Coast Guard's Most Daring Sea Rescue by Michael J. Tougias and Casey Sherman
- Produced by: Jim Whitaker; Dorothy Aufiero
- Starring: Chris Pine; Casey Affleck; Ben Foster; Holliday Grainger; John Ortiz; Eric Bana
- Cinematography: Javier Aguirresarobe
- Edited by: Tatiana S. Riegel
- Music by: Carter Burwell
- Production companies: Walt Disney Pictures; Whitaker Entertainment; Red Hawk Entertainment
- Distributed by: Walt Disney Studios; Motion Pictures
- Release dates: January 25, 2016 (TCL Chinese Theatre); January 29, 2016 (United States)
- Running time: 117 minutes
- Country: United States
- Language: English
- Budget: $70–80 million
- Box office: $52.1 million

The Finest Hours is a 2016 American action thriller film directed by Craig Gillespie and produced by Walt Disney Pictures. The screenplay, written by Eric Johnson, Scott Silver, and Paul Tamasy, is based on The Finest Hours: The True Story of the U.S. Coast Guard's Most Daring Sea Rescue by Michael J. Tougias and Casey Sherman. The film stars Chris Pine, Casey Affleck, Ben Foster, Holliday Grainger, John Ortiz, and Eric Bana, and chronicles the historic 1952 United States Coast Guard rescue of the crew of SS Pendleton, after the ship split apart during a nor'easter off the New England coast.

The Finest Hours was released on January 29, 2016. The film, which received mixed reviews from critics, was considered a box office flop for only grossing $52 million worldwide on a $70–80 million production budget.

== Plot ==
Bernard "Bernie" Webber, a crewman at Coast Guard Station Chatham, Massachusetts, on Cape Cod, has fallen in love with a local girl, Miriam Penttinen. The two plan to marry on April 16, but in accordance with Coast Guard regulations, Bernie must seek permission from the station's commanding officer, Chief Warrant Officer Daniel Cluff. However, it is usually just a formality. On the day he is due to ask permission, February 18, 1952, the oil tanker SS Pendleton shears in half off the Chatham coast after getting caught in a nor'easter. With the majority of the station's crew already underway with the rescue of the similarly damaged SS Fort Mercer, Bernie is dispatched to pilot motor lifeboat CG 36500 to rescue the crew of Pendleton. Andrew Fitzgerald, Ervin Maske, and Richard P. Livesey volunteer to join Bernie on the rescue mission.

Meanwhile, the Pendleton's engineer, Ray Sybert, as the surviving senior officer, organizes the surviving seamen to steer the sinking stern of the tanker onto a submerged reef, where it can lodge until rescuers arrive. Miriam learns that Bernie is leading the rescue effort and believes it to be a suicide mission. Few people in Chatham trust Cluff, thinking he cannot do his job because he is not from the area. Miriam drives to the station, demanding that Cluff call Bernie back. Cluff refuses and brusquely orders Miriam out.

Between Chatham Harbor and the open sea lies a bar, a series of shoals that are very dangerous even in good weather. Bernie must time bursts of his engine to ride each approaching wave before it breaks as he pilots CG 36500 across the bar. Although he makes it over the bar, he loses his compass.

Bernie steers CG 36500 to the stricken tanker. Although his boat's designated capacity is only 12 people, Bernie manages to rescue 32 crew members. The stern of Pendleton begins sinking more rapidly during the rescue and goes down shortly after the last crewman comes aboard Bernie's boat. Relying on his knowledge of the coast and prevailing winds in place of his compass, Bernie steers CG 36500 toward home—a task made more difficult as Chatham loses power. Miriam and the other townspeople drive their cars to the pier and turn on their headlights to guide Bernie in.

Epilogue: Two months later, Bernie and Miriam married, remaining together for fifty-eight years until Bernie died in 2009 at age 81. What Webber, Livesey, Fitzgerald and Maske accomplished is still considered the greatest small boat rescue in Coast Guard history. All four Coast Guardsmen were awarded the Gold Lifesaving Medal for their heroic actions. Photographs from the event reveal the enormity of the rescue.

== Cast ==
- Chris Pine as Boatswain's Mate First Class Bernard "Bernie" Webber
- Casey Affleck as Ray Sybert
- Ben Foster as Seaman Richard Livesey
- Holliday Grainger as Miriam Pentinen Webber
- John Ortiz as Seaman Wallace Quirey
- Kyle Gallner as Engineman Third Class Andrew Fitzgerald
- John Magaro as Seaman Ervin Maske
- Graham McTavish as Frank "Pop" Fauteux
- Michael Raymond-James as A.B. Seaman D.A. Brown
- Eric Bana as Chief Warrant Officer Daniel Cluff
- Beau Knapp as Mel "Gus" Gouthro
- Josh Stewart as Tchuda Southerland
- Abraham Benrubi as George "Tiny" Myers
- Keiynan Lonsdale as Eldon Hanan
- Rachel Brosnahan as Bea Hansen
- Ben Koldyke as Donald Bangs
- Matthew Maher as Carl Nickerson

== Production ==
=== Development ===
Walt Disney Pictures acquired the screen rights to Casey Sherman and Michael Tougias' 2009 book, The Finest Hours: The True Story of a Heroic Sea Rescue in August 2011. Paul Tamasy and Eric Johnson wrote the script based on the book and interviews they conducted with survivors. In May 2013, Robert Schwentke was hired to direct the film. However, Schwentke left the project to direct The Divergent Series: Insurgent, and was replaced with Craig Gillespie in April 2014. Casting was conducted from April through October 2014.

=== Filming ===
Principal photography began on September 8, 2014, in Quincy, Massachusetts. On October 27, the film was being shot at Fore River Shipyard in Quincy aboard USS Salem. They were also set to film at various South Shore locations and then move to Chatham, Massachusetts, in December. In early December, filming was taking place in the town of Marshfield. Affleck was seen playing piano at Symphony Hall in Boston on December 12, during the Chatham shoot, and expressed to the Boston Globe that his experience shooting the film was "one of [his] best". Production designer Michael Corenblith reproduced the interior of Pendleton. Post-production lasted a year, with the film requiring nearly 1,000 visual effects shots. Moving Picture Company (MPC) was responsible for creating the majority of those shots.

== Soundtrack ==
The film score is composed by Carter Burwell, which was performed by the Hollywood Studio Symphony. Portions of Carter Burwell's score were replaced with music composed by Philip Klein, who had served as arranger on Burwell's score. Burwell chose to include two of Klein's tracks on the album. The album also includes five tracks that Burwell recorded but which were replaced in the finished film. Walt Disney Records released the score on January 29, 2016.

== Release ==
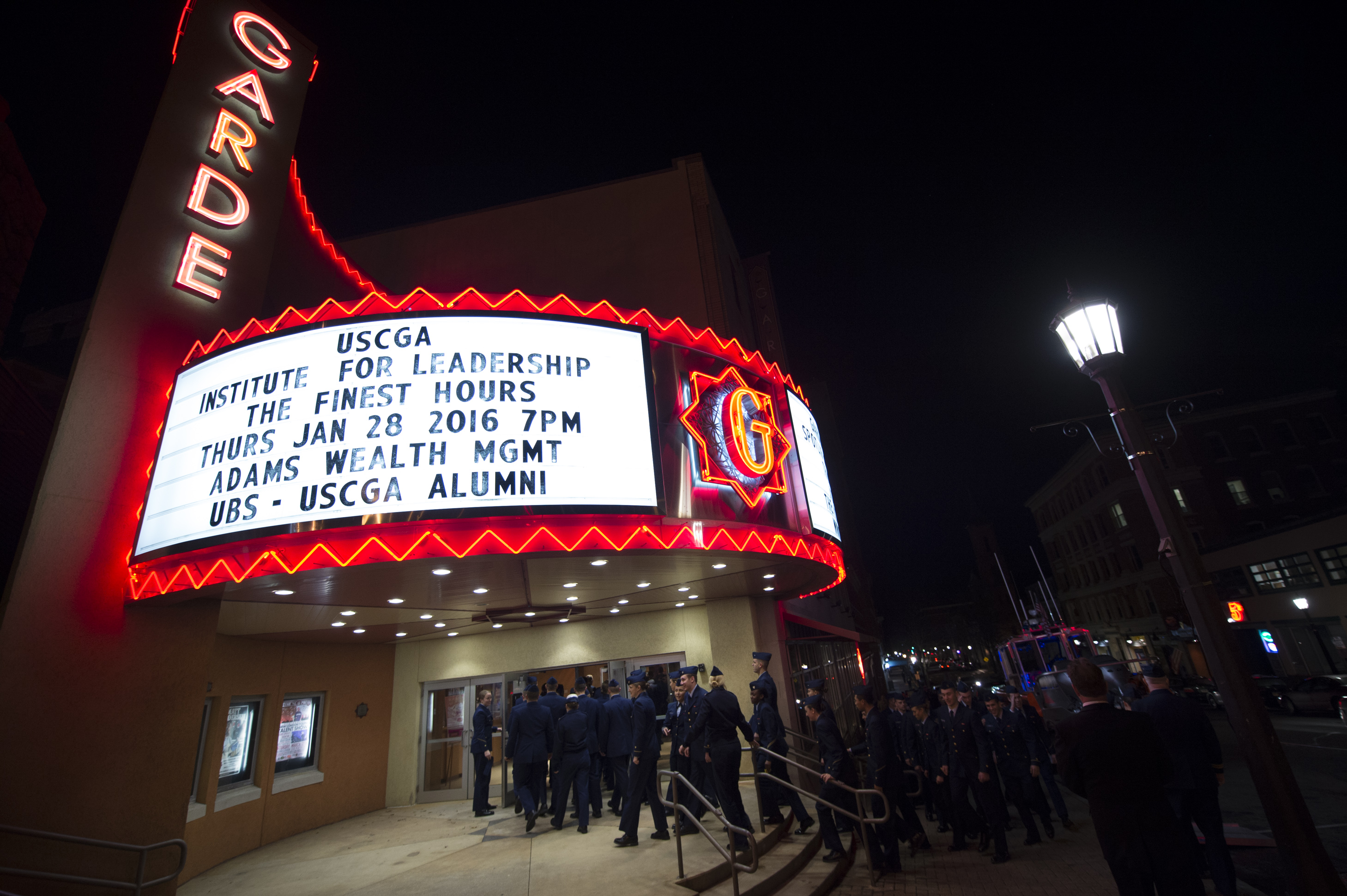
U.S. Coast Guard Academy cadets at Garde Arts Center in New London

Walt Disney Studios Motion Pictures originally set The Finest Hours for release on April 15, 2016, and then October 9, 2015, until announcing a final release date of January 29, 2016. The first trailer for the film was released on July 8, 2015. A second trailer was released on November 11, 2015. The Finest Hours opened the Coronado Island Film Festival on January 15, 2016. The film held its world premiere at the TCL Chinese Theatre in Hollywood, California, on January 25, 2016.

=== Home media ===
Walt Disney Studios Home Entertainment released the film on Blu-ray, DVD, and digital download on May 24, 2016.

== Reception ==
=== Box office ===
The Finest Hours grossed $27.6 million in North America and $24.5 million in other territories for a worldwide total of $52.1 million.

The film was released in North America on January 29, 2016, alongside Kung Fu Panda 3, Fifty Shades of Black, and Jane Got a Gun. The film was projected to gross $10–13 million from 3,143 theaters in its opening weekend. The film grossed $375,000 from its Thursday night previews and $3.3 million on its first day. It went on to gross $10.3 million in its opening weekend, finishing 4th at the box office.

In March 2016, Variety reported Disney was expecting losses of around $75 million from the film.

=== Critical response ===
On Rotten Tomatoes, the film has an approval rating of 63% based on 201 reviews, with an average rating of 6/10. The site's consensus states, "Old-fashioned to a fault, The Finest Hours will satisfy those seeking a traditional rescue drama – but may leave more adventurous viewers wanting more." On Metacritic, the film has a score of 58 out of 100, based on 39 critics, indicating "mixed or average reviews". Audiences polled by CinemaScore gave the film an average grade of "A−" on an A+ to F scale.

== Works cited ==
- Barbo, Theresa Mitchell; Webster, W. Russell (2010). The Pendleton Disaster off Cape Cod: The Greatest Small Boat Rescue in Coast Guard History (2015 ed.). Charleston, South Carolina: The History Press. ISBN 978-1-60949-050-8.
- Tougias, Michael J.; Sherman, Casey (2009). The Finest Hours: The True Story of the U.S. Coast Guard's Most Daring Sea Rescue. New York: Scribner. ISBN 978-1-4165-6721-9.
- The Daring Coast Guard Rescue of the Pendleton Crew. The History Press. September 24, 2013.
- "Bernard C. Webber, USCG 1928–2009". United States Coast Guard. July 14, 2015.
