= Swan Island Shipyard =

Defunct shipyard in Portland, Oregon, U.S.

Coordinates: 45.566°N 122.722°W

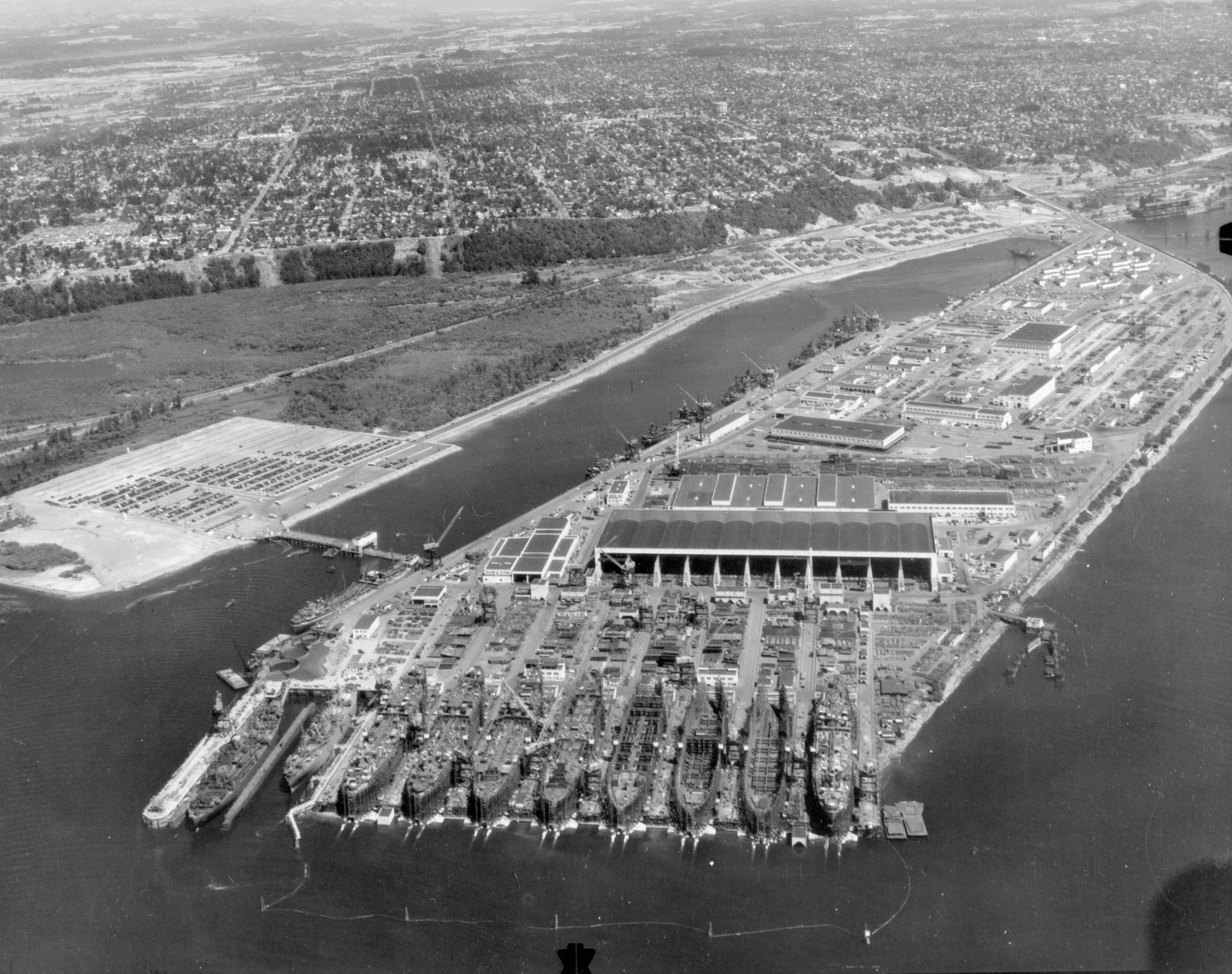
The shipyard in 1945

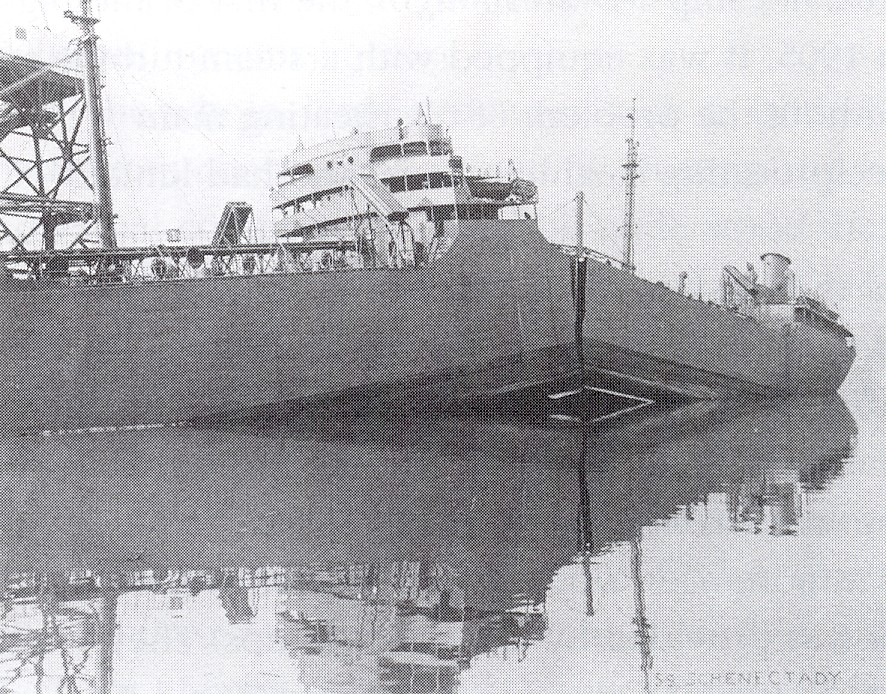
The first vessel produced at the shipyard, SS Schenectady, suffered a hull fracture after completing sea trials.

The Kaiser Company, Portland, commonly known as the Swan Island Shipyard, was a shipyard on Swan Island in Portland, Oregon, United States. It was constructed by the Kaiser Company in 1942 as part of the U.S. Maritime Commission's Emergency Shipbuilding Program in World War II. The Swan Island yard was one of three Kaiser shipyards in the Portland area, along with the Oregon Shipbuilding Corporation and the Vancouver Shipyard.

== History ==
Before the opening of the shipyard, Swan Island was the location of the Swan Island Airport. The Port of Portland leased the airport to the U.S. federal government in March 1942. The completed Swan Island yard began production in July 1942 with eight shipways. The shipyard was one of four in the United States specifically designed to produce T2 tankers. It produced 147 tankers over the course of the war, all of them of the T2-SE-A1 design.

== Notable vessels ==
- SS Jacksonville
- SS Pendleton
- SS Sackett's Harbor
- SS Schenectady

== See also ==
- Vanport, Oregon – Housing project constructed by the Kaiser Company for its shipyard workers
