= Michael J. Tougias =

American writer

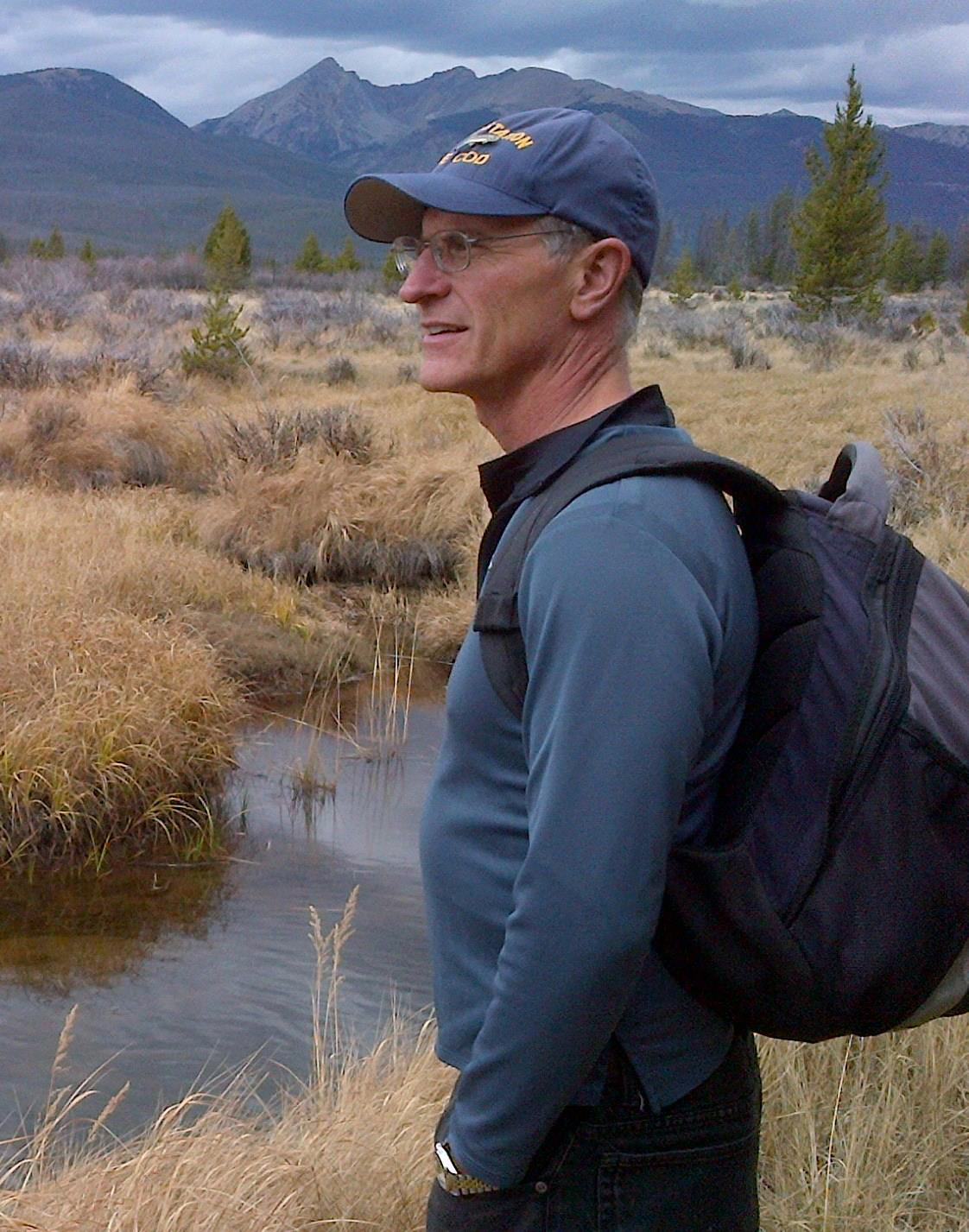
- Author Michael J. Tougias
- Education: Boston College, Saint Michael's College
- Occupation: Writer
- Writing career
- Subjects: travel, adventure, United States Coast Guard
- Website: michaeltougias.com

Michael J. Tougias (born 1955 in Longmeadow, Massachusetts) is an American writer who writes about maritime, survival, leadership, travel, and adventure topics.

== Career ==
Michael J. Tougias is a N.Y. Times Bestselling author of 30 books for adults and 9 for young adults.

An avid fisherman, Tougias became a self-syndicated outdoors writer in 1990. At the time he was also managing a division of a major insurance company. He published the first of 39 books in 1998.

His book The Finest Hours: The True Story Behind the US Coast Guard's Most Daring Rescue (2009), co-authored with Casey Sherman, was adapted as a Disney film by the same name, released in 2016.

== Education ==
He attended Boston College (1973–74) and graduated from Saint Michael's College in Vermont in 1977.

== Personal life ==
He lives in Massachusetts and Florida.

== Works ==
=== Novels ===
- Until I Have No Country: A Novel of King Philip's War (1996) ISBN 1888768029

=== Non-fiction ===
Autobiographies

- The Waters Between Us: A Boy, A Father, and The Healing Power of Nature (2021, Michael Tougias, memoirs) ISBN 97814930-5760-3
- There's A Porcupine In My Outhouse: Misadventures Of A Mountain Man Wannabe (2002, with Mike Tougias), memoirs ISBN 193186862X
- The Cringe Chronicles: Mortifying Misadventures with My Dad: A Memoir (2014, with Kristin Tougias), memoirs ISBN 1612963404

True events

- Extreme Survival: Lessons From Those Who Have Triumphed Against All Odds (2023, ISBN 978-1-68481-255-4
- Ten Hours Until Dawn: The True Story of Heroism and Tragedy Aboard the Can Do (2005, with Frank Quirk Jr.) ISBN 0312334362
  Young Readers Edition: Into the Blizzard: Heroism at Sea During the Great Blizzard of 1978 (Expected publication: 2019) ISBN 1974989100
- Fatal Forecast: An Incredible True Tale of Disaster and Survival at Sea (2006) ISBN 0743297040
- The Finest Hours: The True Story of the U.S. Coast Guard's Most Daring Sea Rescue (2009, with Casey Sherman) ISBN 1416567216
- Overboard!: A True Blue-Water Odyssey of Disaster and Survival (2010) ISBN 1439145741
- A Storm Too Soon: A True Story of Disaster, Survival and an Incredible Rescue (2013) ISBN 1451683332
- Rescue of the Bounty: Disaster and Survival in Superstorm Sandy (2014, with Douglas A. Campbell) ISBN 147674663X
- So Close to Home: A True Story of an American Family's Fight for Survival During World War II (2016, with Alison O'Leary) ISBN 1681771306
- True Rescue: A Storm Too Soon: A Remarkable True Survival Story in 80-Foot Seas (2021) ISBN 125013756X

History

- King Philip's War: The History and Legacy of America's Forgotten Conflict (1999, with Eric B. Schultz) ISBN 0881504831
- The Blizzard of '78 (2001) ISBN 0971954755
- Above & Beyond: John F. Kennedy and America's Most Dangerous Cold War Spy Mission (2018, with Casey Sherman) ISBN 1610398041

Travels

- Nature Walks In Central & Western Massachusetts, 2nd (2000) ISBN 1878239953
- River Days: Exploring the Connecticut River and its History from Source to Sea (2001) ISBN 1929173032
- Quabbin: A History and Explorer's Guide (2002) ISBN 0971954712
- AMC's Best Day Hikes near Boston, 2nd: Four-Season Guide to 60 of the Best Trails in Eastern Massachusetts (2006, with John S. Burk) ISBN 1934028479
- Good Night Vermont (2007) ISBN 1602190178

For young adults

- The True Survival Series (Little Brown)
- The True Rescue Series (McMillan)

== Adaptations ==
- The Finest Hours (2016), film directed by Craig Gillespie, based on non-fiction book The Finest Hours: The True Story of the U.S. Coast Guard's Most Daring Sea Rescue
