= Coast Guard Motor Lifeboat CG 36500 =

Historic lifeboat

Coast Guard Motor Lifeboat CG-36500
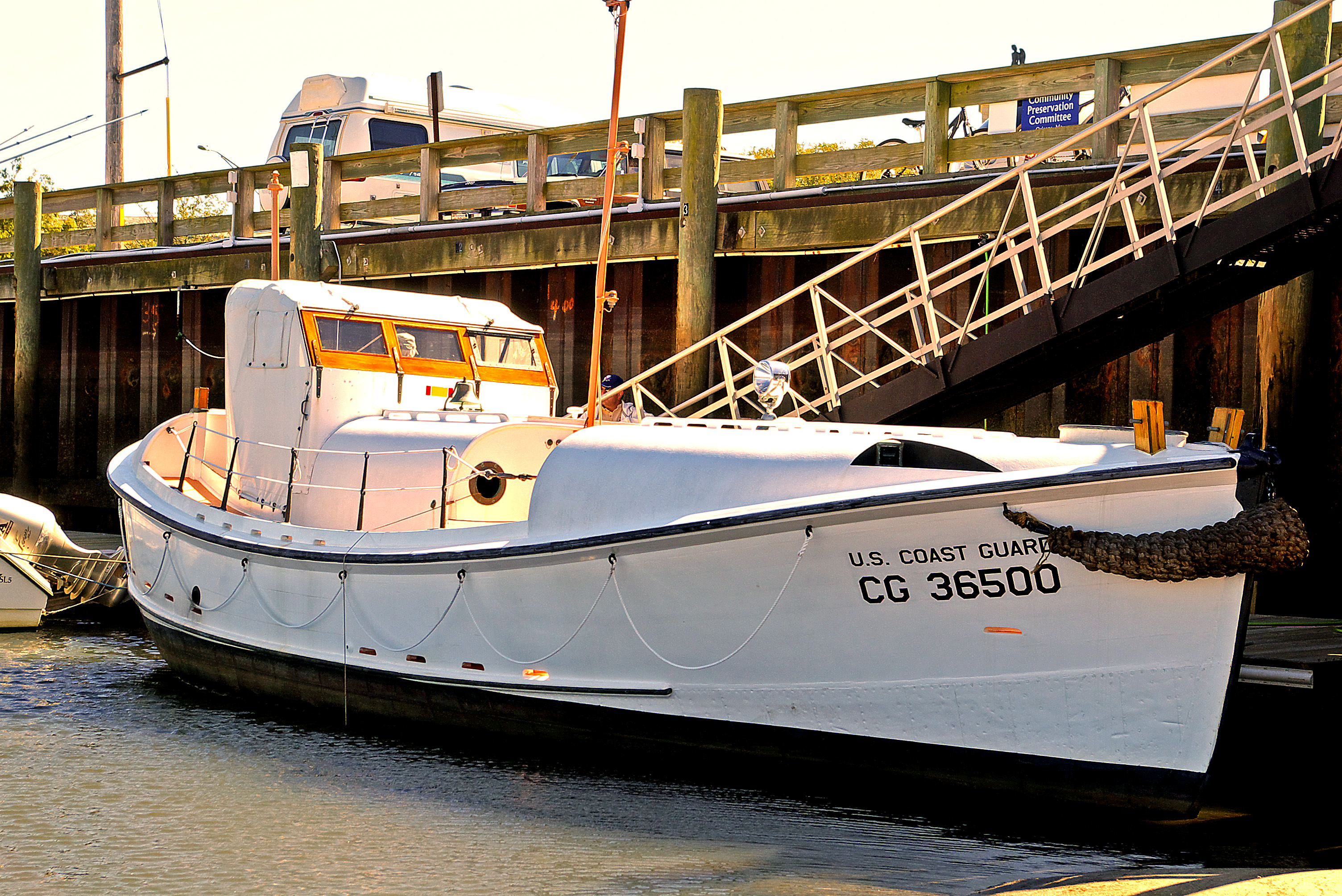
- Coast Guard Motor Lifeboat CG 36500 as a museum boat

History

United States
- Name: CG-36500
- Operator: United States Coast Guard
- Builder: United States Coast Guard Yard, Curtis Bay, Maryland
- Completed: 1946
- Out of service: 1968
- Status: Museum boat

General characteristics
- Tonnage: 9.1 t (20,000 lb)
- Length: 36 ft (11.0 m)
- Installed power: 160 hp (119 kW)
- Propulsion: General Motors 4-71 diesel
- Crew: 4
- Coast Guard Motor Lifeboat CG-36500
- U.S. National Register of Historic Places
- Location within Massachusetts
- Location: Orleans, Massachusetts
- Coordinates: 41°47′58″N 70°0′32″W
- Built: 1946
- Architect: U.S. Coast Guard Yard Curtis Bay, Maryland
- NRHP reference No.: 05000467
- Added to NRHP: 27 May 2005

Coast Guard Motor Lifeboat CG-36500 is a historic, 36-foot lifeboat that is berthed at Rock Harbor in Orleans, Massachusetts. Built in 1946, it is notable for its involvement in the 1952 SS Pendleton rescue, one of the most daring such events recorded in the history of the United States Coast Guard. It was listed on the National Register of Historic Places in 2005, and now serves as a museum boat.

== Description ==
CG-36500 is a standard 36-foot (11 m) lifeboat, a vessel designed to remain operational under extremely difficult conditions. It has a heavy 2,000 pounds (910 kg) bronze keel and skeg, watertight compartments, and self-bailing features. Most of its wooden elements are white oak frames, with cypress planking, and it has a total weight of nearly 20,000 pounds (9,100 kg). It is sheathed with Monel plating, which allowed for winter time ice breaking.

== History ==
The boat was built in 1946 at the Curtis Bay Maryland Coast Guard Yard, where all 36-footers were built. From 1946 to 1968 it was stationed at the U.S. Coast Guard Life Boat Station Chatham. On 18 February 1952, the crew of CG-36500, which consisted of Boatswain's Mate First Class Bernard C. Webber (coxswain), Engineman Third Class Andrew Fitzgerald, Seaman Ervin Maske, and Seaman Richard P. Livesey, rescued 32 of 33 crewmen trapped on the stern section of the tanker SS Pendleton, but one person, George Dewey "Tiny" Myers, got slammed against Pendleton and CG36500, killing him. Pendleton's stern section had broken in half in a storm off Chatham, Massachusetts. (The ship's eight other crew members, including Captain John Fitzgerald, were on the bow section when it broke off and sank.) The rescue of the survivors of the shipwrecked Pendleton is considered one of the most daring rescues of the United States Coast Guard. The story is told in the 2016 motion picture The Finest Hours, based on the 2009 book by the same title.

CG-36500 was taken out of service in 1968 and was given to the National Park Service for use as an exhibit at Cape Cod National Seashore. In November 1981, the Park Service, which had not effected any significant restoration work on the vessel, deeded it to the Orleans Historical Society, and a restoration started by a group of volunteers from Chatham, Orleans, and Harwich, Massachusetts. Restoration work was completed in six months and the boat was re-launched in a public ceremony that Bernard Webber and his wife attended. It is powered by a Detroit Diesel 4-71 built in 1948, with about 95 horsepower. During the rescue, it was powered by a 6-cylinder Sterling Petrel gas engine made in Buffalo, New York. The carbureted engine was problematic during the rescue.

== See also ==
- National Register of Historic Places listings in Barnstable County, Massachusetts
- CG 30615
