= Kaiser Shipyards =

Shipbuilding yards on the West Coast of the United States

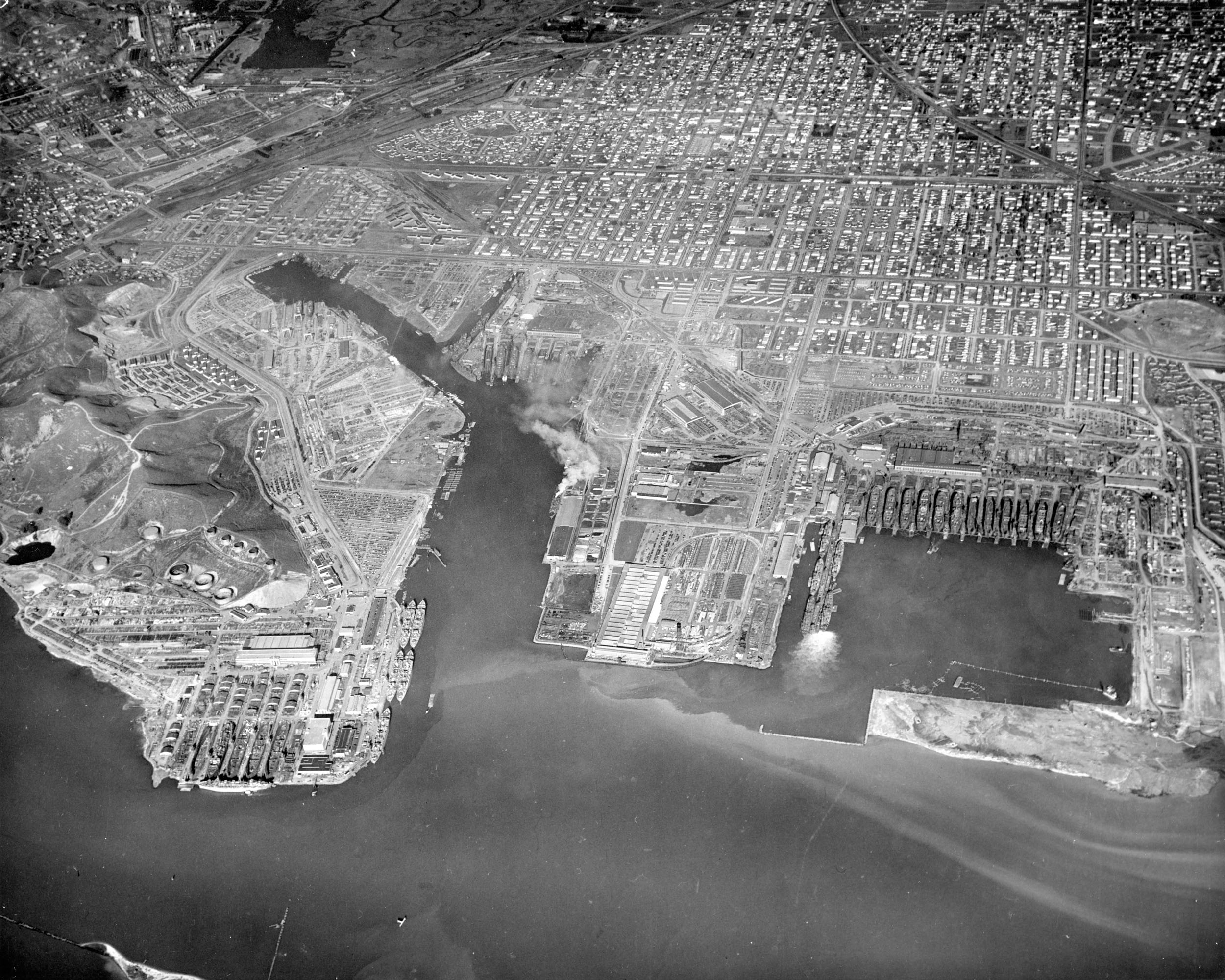
Richmond Shipyards

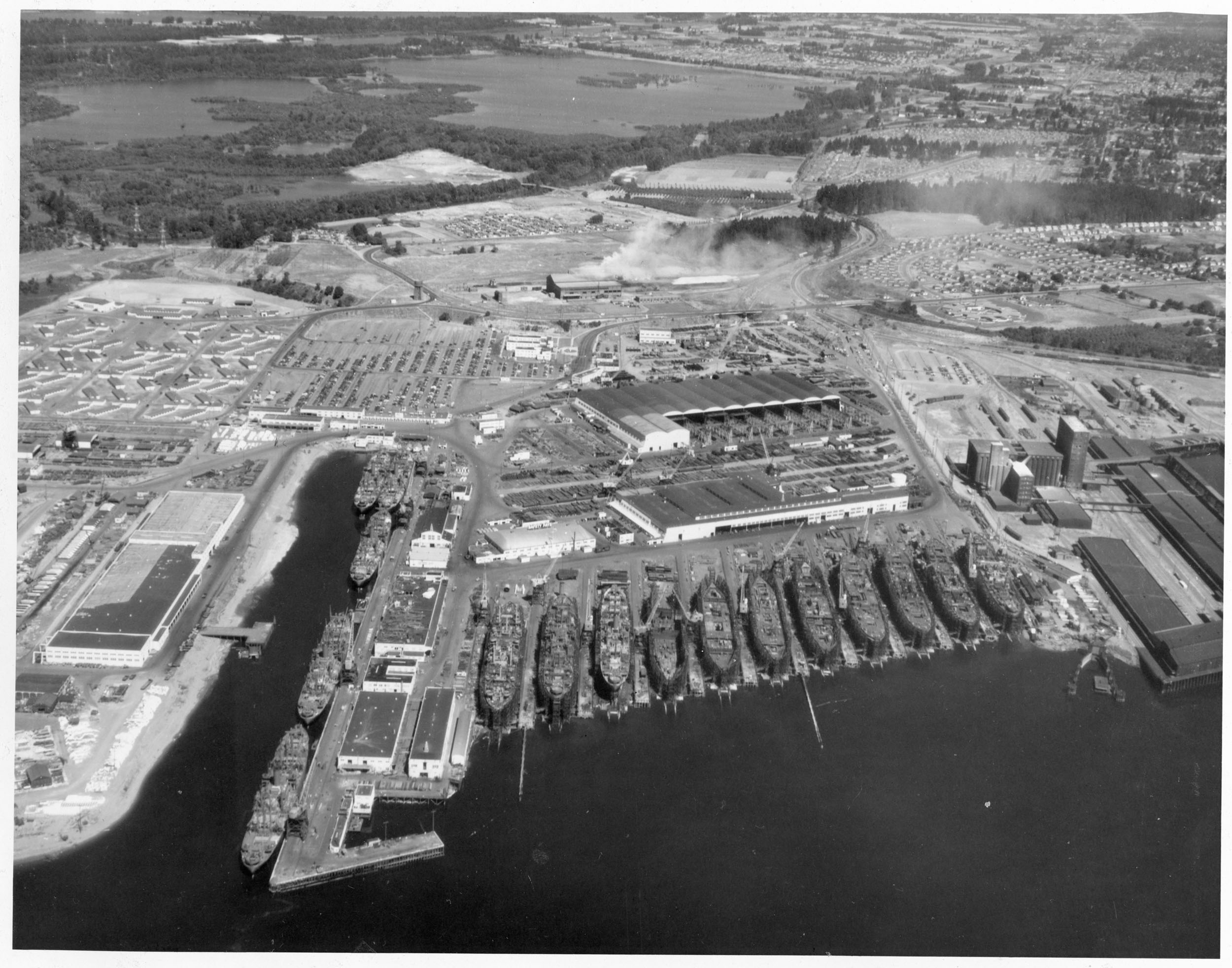
Oregon Shipbuilding Corporation

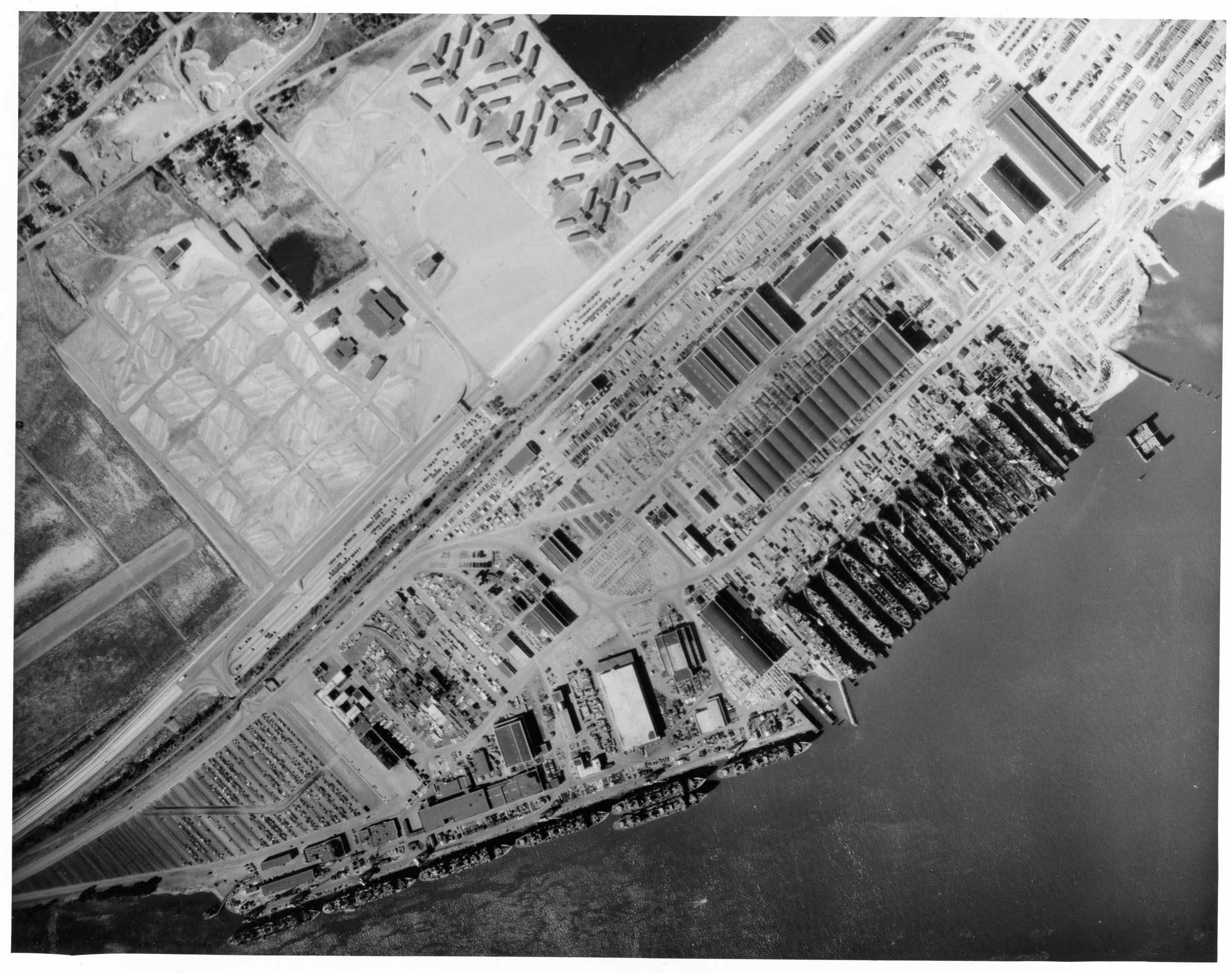
Vancouver Shipyard

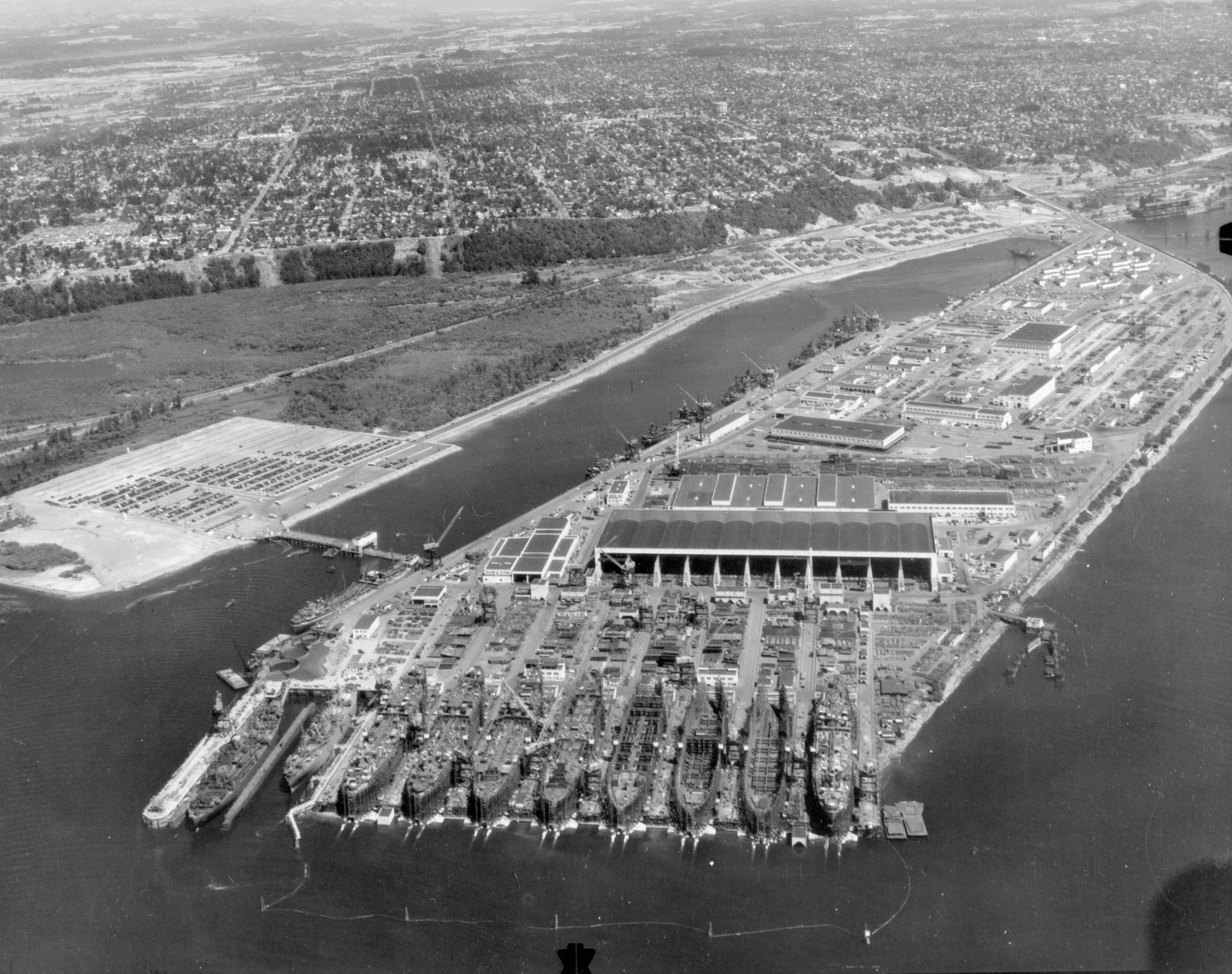
Swan Island Shipyard

The Kaiser Shipyards were seven major shipbuilding yards located on the West Coast of the United States during World War II. Kaiser ranked 20th among U.S. corporations in the value of wartime production contracts. The shipyards were a creation of American industrialist Henry J. Kaiser (1882–1967), who entered the shipbuilding industry in order to help meet the construction goals set by the United States Maritime Commission for merchant shipping.

Four of the Kaiser Shipyards were located in Richmond, California, and were called the Richmond Shipyards. Three other shipyards were located in the Pacific Northwest along the Columbia and Willamette rivers: the Oregon Shipbuilding Corporation and the Swan Island Shipyard in Portland, Oregon, and the Vancouver Shipyard in Vancouver, Washington.

Henry Kaiser was known for developing new methods of shipbuilding, which allowed his yards to outproduce other similar facilities and build 1,490 ships, 27 percent of the total Maritime Commission construction. Kaiser's ships were completed in two-thirds the time and a quarter the cost of the average of all other shipyards. Liberty ships were typically assembled in a little over two weeks, and one in less than five days.

Kaiser Shipyards shut down at the end of the war. The Rosie the Riveter/World War II Home Front National Historical Park was dedicated October 25, 2000, on the site of one of the shipyards in Richmond.

== History ==
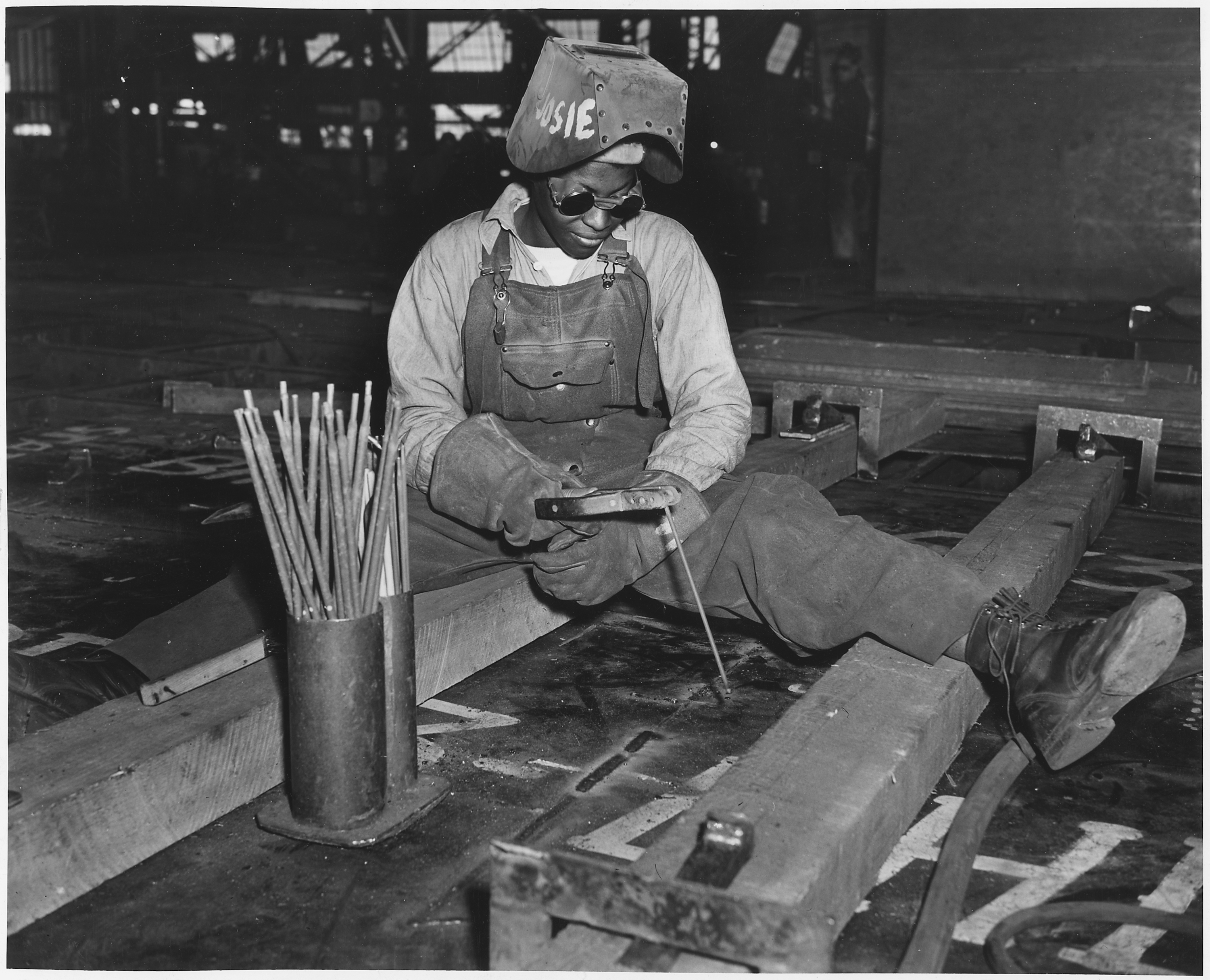
A welder helping construct the SS George Washington Carver at the Richmond Shipyards, April 1943

Henry Kaiser had been building cargo ships for the United States Maritime Commission in the 1930s, partnering with Todd Shipyards Corporation and the Bath Iron Works. When orders for ships from the British government, already at war with Germany, allowed for growth, Kaiser established his first Richmond shipyard begun in December 1940.

In April 1941 the Maritime Commission requested an additional Kaiser yard, to be used for Liberty ship construction, and after the attack on Pearl Harbor, Kaiser started third and fourth yards, building troop transports and tank landing ships (LSTs), respectively. His son, Edgar Kaiser, Sr, was appointed vice-president and General Manager of the shipyards.

Together, these four Kaiser Shipyards produced 747 ships, including many of the famous Liberty ships and Victory ships‍—‌for carrying general cargo and military munitions, armaments and supplies, more than any other complex in the United States. Only one of these ships, Red Oak Victory, survives. Two other Liberty ships built in other American yards also exist as working museum exhibits: Jeremiah O'Brien moored in San Francisco and John W. Brown in Baltimore. An additional Victory cargo ship also survives: Lane Victory.

Through 1943, the Kaiser Shipyards produced Casablanca-class escort carriers. While promising 16 carriers by 1944, Kaiser encouraged employees to go above and beyond and make 18 instead, with the slogan "18 or more by 44".

== Other details ==
- Kaiser set several records:
  - The Liberty ship SS Robert E. Peary was assembled in less than five days as a part of a special competition among shipyards.
  - At the Oregon Shipbuilding Yard on the Columbia River, near Portland, the Victory ship SS Joseph N. Teal was built in ten days in fall 1942.
- The Oregon Shipbuilding Yards were responsible for 455 ships.
- Kaiser recruited from across the United States to work in his yards, hiring women and minorities.
- Fields Point in Providence, Rhode Island, had a shipyard run as the Walsh-Kaiser Company after former management (Rheem) ran into difficulties. The shipyard was closed and sold after the war. A Swedish shipowner dismantled the shipyard and later erected it in the city of Uddevalla on the west coast of Sweden.

== See also ==
- Kaiser Permanente, an HMO founded by Henry J. Kaiser
- Marinship
- Shipyard Railway, which transported workers to the Kaiser Shipyards in Richmond, California
- Vanport, Oregon

== Notes ==
=== References ===
- Herman, Arthur. Freedom's Forge: How American Business Produced Victory in World War II (New York: Random House, 2012). ISBN 978-1-4000-6964-4
