= Coast Guard Station Chatham =

US Coast Guard station in Massachusetts

- Part of USCG Sector Southeastern New England
- Chatham, Massachusetts
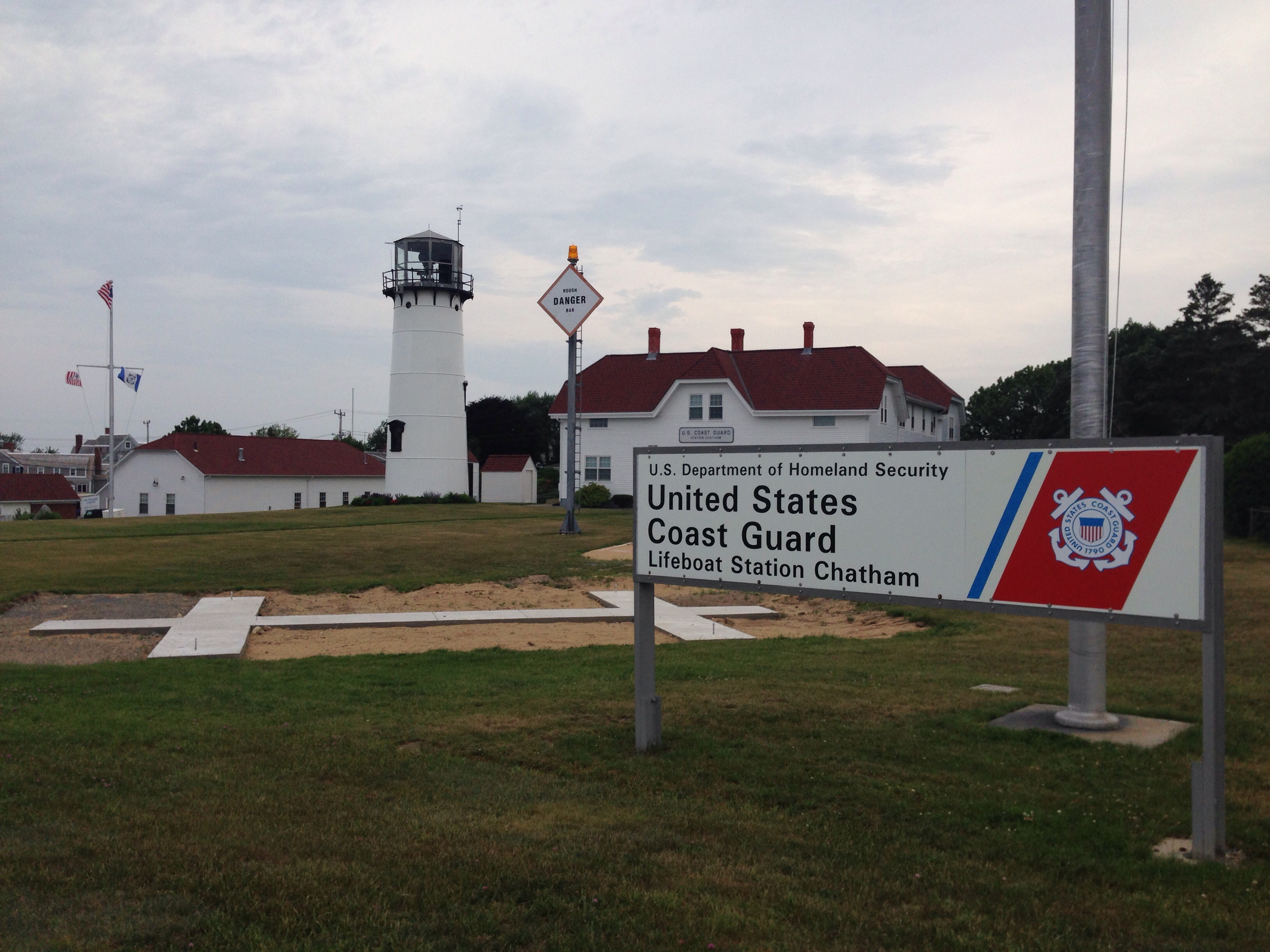

Site information
- Type: Coast Guard Station
- Owner: United States Coast Guard
- Open to the public: By Appointment Only

Location
- Coordinates: 41.6716°N 69.9499°W

Site history
- In use: ???-Present

United States Coast Guard Station Chatham is a United States Coast Guard station located in Chatham, Massachusetts. The station was the site of the famous 1952 Pendleton rescue.

== See also ==
- List of military installations in Massachusetts
