= Protector =

Protector(s) or The Protector(s) may refer to:

== Roles and titles ==
- Protector (title), a title or part of various historical titles of heads of state and others in authority
  - Lord Protector, a title that has been used in British constitutional law for the head of state
- Protector (role variant), in personality testing, a role variant in the Keirsey Temperament Sorter
- Protector (trust), in trust law, a third party who monitors and controls the trustees

== Arts, entertainment and media ==
=== Fictional entities ===
- Protector (DC Comics), a superhero who occasionally teams up with the Teen Titans
- Protectors (comics), a comic book series by Malibu Comics 1992–1994
- Pak Protector, a form of alien life in Larry Niven's Known Space universe
- Protector, an alias of Noh-Varr in Marvel Comics
- Alexis The Protector, in the Avengers A.I. of Marvel Comics

=== Films ===
- Protector (2009 film), a Czech film
- Protector (2025 film), a Korean-American action-thriller film
- The Protector (1985 film), a Hong Kong-American action film
- The Protector (1997 film), an American action film
- The Protector (2005 film) or Tom-Yum-Goong, a Thai martial arts film
- The Protector (2022 film), a Canadian thriller film

=== Gaming ===
- Protector (Atari Jaguar game), 1999
- Protector (1981 video game), for Atari 8-bit computers

=== Literature ===
- Protector (novel), a 1973 novel by Larry Niven
- Protector, a 2013 novel by C. J. Cherryh in the Foreigner series
- The Protector, a 1911 novel by Harold Bindloss
- The Protector, a 1979 novel by Malcolm Braly
- The Protector, a 2003 novel by David Morrell (writer)

=== Music ===
- "Protector", a song by Iron Savior from the album Condition Red (2002)
- "Protector", a song by Beyoncé from the album Cowboy Carter (2024)

=== Television ===
==== Episodes ====
- "Protector", Godzilla: The Series season 2, episode 4 (1999)
- "Protector", Ika-6 na Utos episode 364 (2018)
- "Protector", Sherlock Jr. episode 51 (2018)
- "Protectors", Street Justice season 1, episode 15 (1992)
- "The Protector", Gundam Build Divers episode 3 (2018)
- "The Protector", Mars Ravelo's Darna (2022) season 1, episode 1 (2022)
- "The Protector", Take a Letter, Mr. Jones episode 2 (1981)
- "The Protector", The All-New Super Friends Hour episode 15a (1977)
- "The Protector", The Four Just Men episode 26 (1960)
- "The Protector", The Name of the Game season 1, episode 9 (1968)
- "The Protector", Titus season 3, episode 21 (2002)
- "The Protector", Trackdown season 2, episode 28 (1959)
- "The Protectors", Barnaby Jones season 7, episode 18 (1979)
- "The Protectors", Dogs season 2, episode 4 (2021)
- "The Protectors", Future Weapons season 2, episode 2 (2007)
- "The Protectors", Laramie season 1, episode 27 (1960)
- "The Protectors", Lassie (1954) season 13, episode 20 (1967)
- "The Protectors", My Sister Eileen episode 24 (1961)
- "The Protectors", Tales from Soho episode 4 (1956)
- "The Protectors", T. J. Hooker season 1, episode 1 (1982)
- "The Protectors", Zoids: Chaotic Century episode 4 (1999)

==== Shows ====
- The Protector (American TV series), 2011
- The Protector (Turkish TV series), 2018
- The Protectors (1964 TV series), see 1964 in British television
- The Protectors, a 1972–1973 British TV series
- The Protectors (Danish TV series), 2009

== Military, naval and civil protection ==
- Protector (RWS), a remotely controlled weapons station
- Protector, a version of the General Atomics MQ-9 Reaper for the Royal Air Force
- Protector, a 1901 submarine built by American naval engineer Simon Lake
- Protector USV, an Israeli unmanned surface vehicle
- Protector class (disambiguation), several classes of maritime vessel
- Protector (fireboat), commissioned in 2016 in Long Beach, California, U.S.
- Protector (fireboat, British Columbia), in Victoria, Canada
- Protector (ship), an index of ships with the name
- HMAS Protector, more than one ship of the Royal Australian Navy
- HMCS Protector, a Canadian naval base at Sydney, Nova Scotia, 1940-1964
- HMS Protector, more than one ship of the Royal Navy
- USS Protector, more than one ship of the U.S. Navy

== Other uses ==
- Richard Lederer (musician), an Austrian metal musician also known as Protector
- Protector (app), a personal security mobile app
- Protector Forsikring, a Norwegian multinational insurance company
- Protector Palm Pistol, a small .32 rimfire revolver
- Protector lock, a trade-name used independently by Alfred Hobbs and Theodore Kromer for safe-locks

== See also ==
- Defender (disambiguation)
- El Protector (disambiguation)
- HMCS Protecteur (AOR 509), a Canadian replenishment oiler, 1969 to present
- Protection (disambiguation)
- Protectory, a Roman Catholic institution for the shelter and training of the young
- Protektor (disambiguation)
