= Protector (ship) =

A number of ships have been named Protector:

- Protector (1779 frigate) was a 26-gun sixth-rate of the Massachusetts Navy launched in 1779 at Newburyport, Massachusetts, that HMS Roebuck and HMS Medea captured on 5 May 1781; the British Royal Navy renamed her HMS Hussar, and sold her in 1783.
- Protector was a ship of 580 tons (bm) launched in 1751 for the British East India Company as a fast heavily armed warship to deter pirates and the French Company in Indian waters. In 1761 a monsoon wrecked her while she rode at anchor in Pondicherry Roads.
- Protector (1826 ship) was a ship of 511 tons (bm) launched in 1826 at Chepstow. Between 1826 and 1831 she made two voyages to India for the British East India Company. She was lost in 1838 near Calcutta.
- Protector (1827 ship) was a barque of 380 tons (bm) launched at Lincoln, New Brunswick, Canada, in 1827 that in 1830 transported colonists to the nascent Swan River Colony.

== See also ==
- HMAS Protector, more than one ship of the Royal Australian Navy
- HMS Protector, more than one ship of the Royal Navy
- USS Protector, more than one ship of the U.S. Navy
- Protector (fireboat), commissioned in 2016 in Long Beach, California, U.S.
- Protector (fireboat, British Columbia), in Victoria, Canada
- Protector class (disambiguation), including Protecteur
