= Protecteur =

Protecteur (French: "protector") may refer to:

- French ship Protecteur
- HMCS Protecteur, ships of the Royal Canadian Navy
- Protecteur-class auxiliary vessel, a class of ships in the Royal Canadian Navy
- Protecteur-class replenishment oiler, a class of ships in the Royal Canadian Navy
- Protecteur de la Confédération du Rhin, a title held by Napoleon I

== See also ==
- Protector (disambiguation)
