= CCGS Goéland =

History

Canada
- Name: Goéland
- Operator: Canadian Coast Guard
- Builder: Hike Metal Products, Wheatley, Ontario
- Yard number: CCGC - 4
- Launched: 1985
- Completed: 1985
- Commissioned: 1985
- Decommissioned: 2020
- In service: 1985-2020
- Home port: CCG Base Sydney, NS
- Identification: VO9155

General characteristics
- Class & type: variant of Waveney-class lifeboat
- Type: Specialty Vessel - Training Vessel
- Tonnage: 92.05 gt
- Length: 13.45 m (44 ft 2 in)
- Beam: 3.86 m (12 ft 8 in)
- Draft: 1.02 m (3 ft 4 in)
- Propulsion: 2 Caterpillar 3208 diesel engines
- Speed: 14.5 knots (26.9 km/h; 16.7 mph)
- Range: 150 nmi (280 km; 170 mi)
- Endurance: 1 day
- Complement: 3

CCGS Goéland is a training vessel of the Canadian Coast Guard and located at the Canadian Coast Guard College in Westmount, Nova Scotia. The ship is based on the 44-foot motor lifeboat, a converted self-righting lifeboat and similar to the Waveney-class lifeboat.

== See also ==
- CCGS CG 117 and CCGS CG 118
