= Canadian Intercollegiate Sailing Association =

- Abbreviation: CICSA
- Legal status: Association
- Region served: Canada
- President: Valerie Louis
- Website: www.cicsailing.ca

The Canadian Intercollegiate Sailing Association (CICSA) is the governing authority for sailing competition at colleges and universities in Canada.

Intercollegiate sailing in Canada dates back to 1937. The organization founded by Lt.-Col. L.F. Grant, was known as C.I.D.R.A at the time. CICSA in its current form came into existence on October 16, 2010, with the help of Landon Gardner.

== Teams ==
22 schools are registered with CICSA

- University of British Columbia
- University of Victoria
- University of Guelph
- McMaster University
- University of Ottawa
- Queen's University
- Royal Military College
- Trent University
- University of Toronto
- University of Waterloo
- Western University
- Wilfrid Laurier University
- Concordia University
- HEC Montréal
- McGill University
- École de technologie supérieure
- Polytechnique Montréal
- Dalhousie University
- Acadia University
- Canadian Coast Guard College
- Memorial University
- University of New Brunswick
