= Protector (comics) =

Protector, in comics, may refer to:

- Protector (DC Comics), the alias used by Jason Hart who briefly took over the role of Robin
- Protector, a number of Marvel Comics characters:
  - Protector, the name used by Thoran Rul who debuted in Fantastic Four
  - Protector, the name used by Gerald Marsh who debuted in Tales to Astonish
  - Protector, the alias currently used by Noh-Varr
  - Protector, an alternate name for Orphan-Maker used for his Generation X action figure release
  - Protector, also known as Alexis the Protector, is a character who debuted in Avengers A.I.
  - Protector, the name used by Isaac Ikeda who debuted in Agents of Atlas Vol. 3

== See also ==
- Protector (disambiguation)
