= 44-foot motor lifeboat =

Standard boat of the U.S. Coast Guard

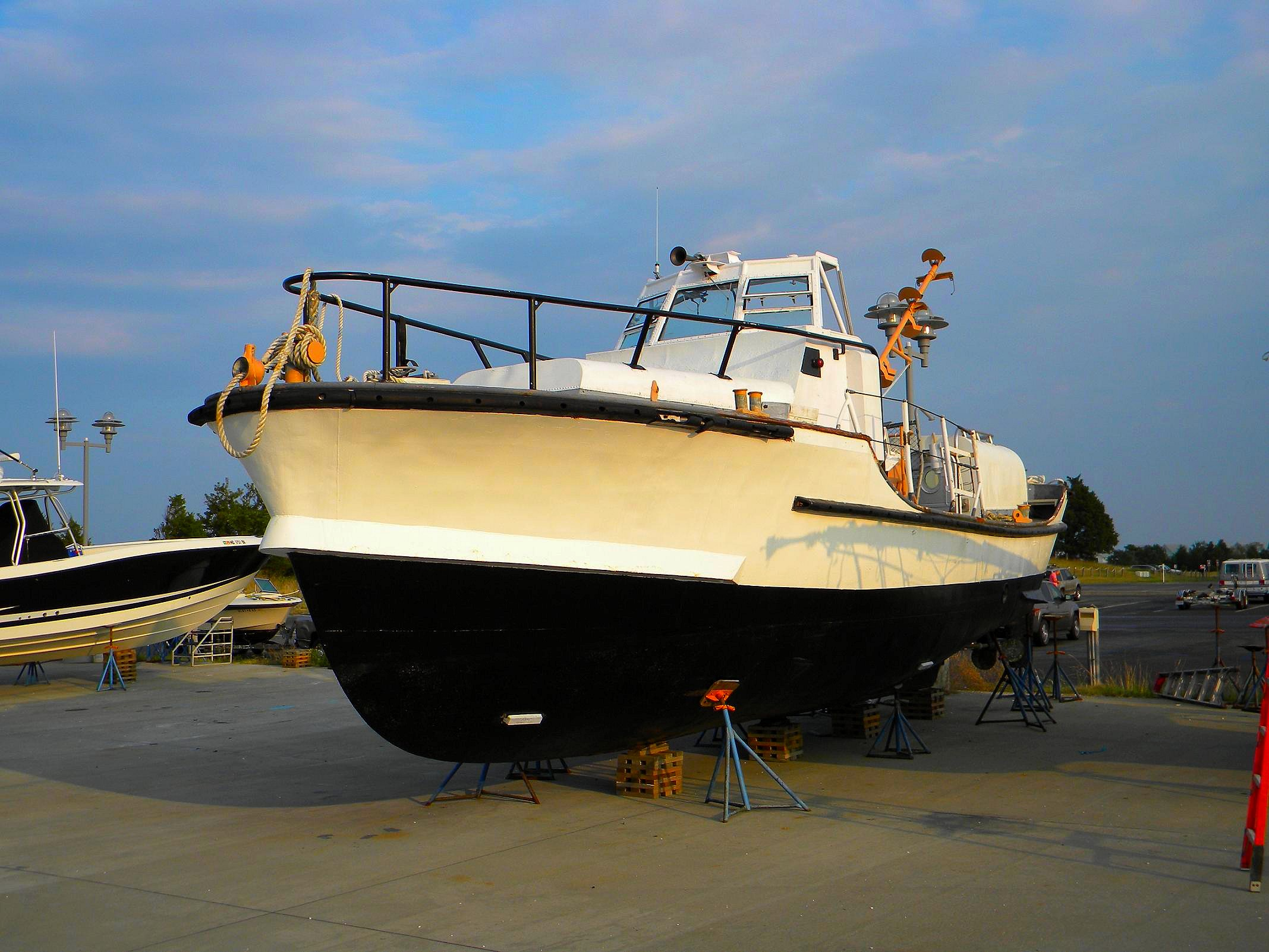
- A former USCG 44′ MLB in drydock

Class overview
- Name: 44' MLB
- Builders: USCG Yard, Curtis Bay, Maryland, USA; Chantier maritimes du Saint-Laurent, Paspébiac, Quebec, Canada
- Operators: United States Navy; Canadian Coast Guard; Italian Coast Guard
- Preceded by: 36-foot motor lifeboat
- Succeeded by: 47-foot Motor Lifeboat
- Cost: $225,000 (circa 1972)
- Built: CG-44300 through CG-44409
- In service: 1962–2009
- Completed: 110

General characteristics
- Displacement: 17.5 t (19 short tons)
- Length: 44 feet 1 1/2 inches (13.449 m)
- Beam: 12 feet 8 inches (3.86 m)
- Draught: 3 feet 2 inches (0.97 m)
- Propulsion: 2×Detroit Diesel 6V53, 185 hp (138 kW) each
- Speed: 14 knots (16 mph; 26 km/h) (Cummins); 14 knots (16 mph; 26 km/h) (GM)
- Range: 215 nmi (398 km)
- Complement: 4 crew

The 44-foot motor lifeboat was the standard workhorse of the United States Coast Guard (USCG) rescue boat fleet, designed in 1961 and built between 1963 and 1972. In the United States, the 44′ MLB replaced the 36' MLB (1929–1987) and was replaced in turn by the 47′ MLB starting in 1997; the last 44′ MLB left service in 2009.

== Design ==
There were 110 boats built in total, assigned hull numbers from CG-44300 through CG-44409. USCG Lt Cdr Robert Witter is credited with their design. The 44' boats are powered by twin diesel engines, each powering a separate propeller, and they have twin rudders.

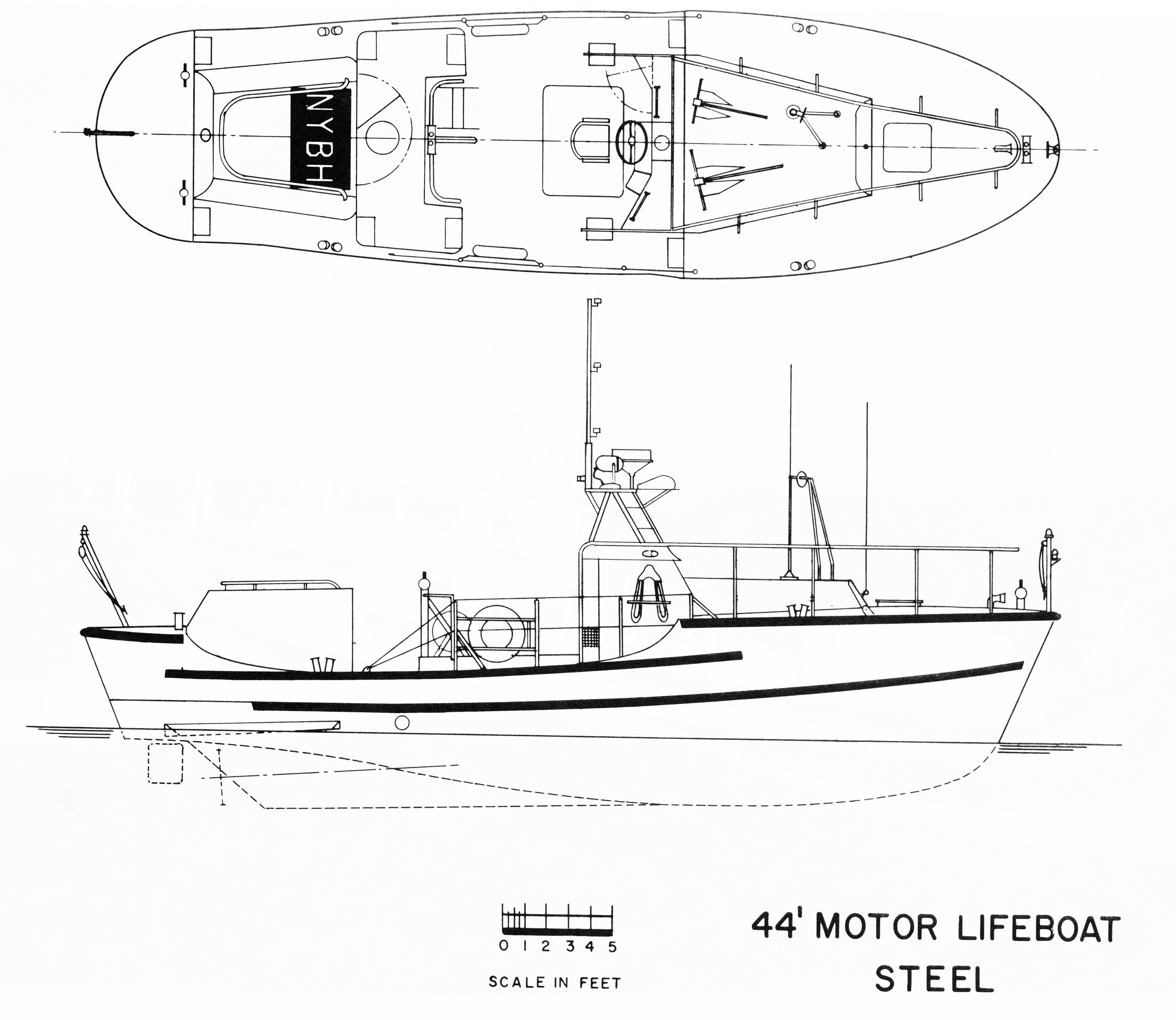
44' MLB line drawing

The hull uses a semi-displacement design to improve speed and provide better seakeeping. The propellers are protected by raising them higher than the lowest portion of the hull to help prevent them being damaged if the boat runs aground. The boats have air-tight compartments forward and aft of the steering station. The aft compartment is designed to hold litters to strap in injured people, while the forward compartment holds uninjured rescued.

The magazine Popular Mechanics reported in 1966 the new fleet of 44' MLBs represented several "firsts":

- The vessels were the first steel-hulled motor lifeboats—earlier vessels had hulls of wood.
- The vessels were the first motor lifeboats where a single crew member handled both the engine throttle and steering wheel.
- The vessels were the first motor lifeboats designed to automatically right themselves if overturned.

== Operating history ==
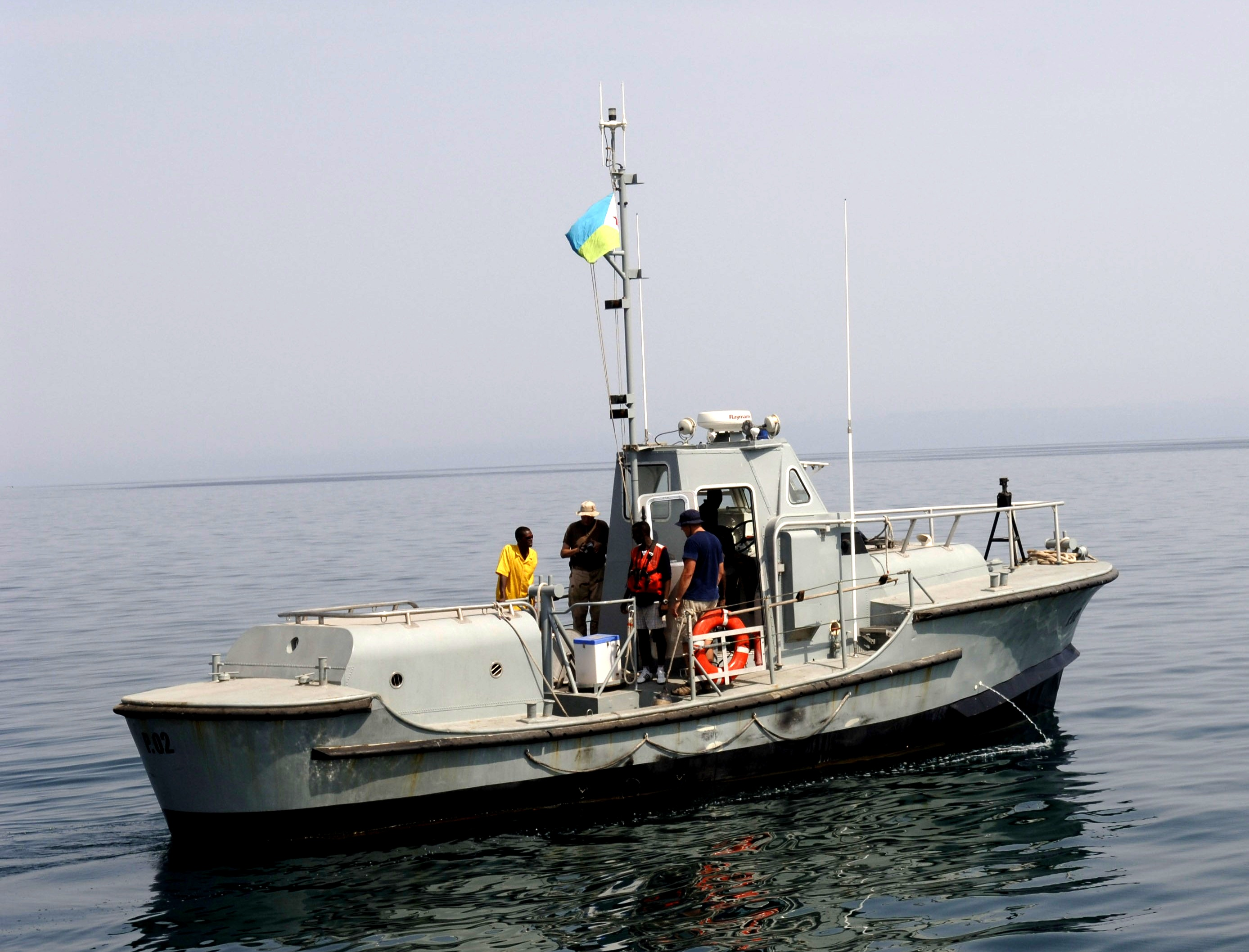
44 footer in 2006

The first boat, CG-44300, was laid down in April 1961 at the Curtis Bay Yard, launched in February 1962, and completed on March 9, 1962; she underwent initial trials at Coast Guard Station Chatham in April before being assigned to Coast Guard Station Yaquina Bay in October, where she served until 1981, when she was reassigned to the National Motor Lifeboat School at Coast Guard Station Cape Disappointment. CG-44300 suffered a serious engine breakdown on July 29, 1996, during a search and rescue mission, and was taken out of service; the Coast Guard has loaned CG-44300 to the Columbia River Maritime Museum, where it is on display in Astoria, Oregon.

CG-44301 was the first regular production 44' MLB and was assigned to Station Chatham after completion in 1963. It also was the last 44' MLB to be withdrawn from service, decommissioned in spring 2010; it was retained past the introduction of the 47' MLB in 1997 because the deeper draft of the larger 47' MLB prevented it from traversing the bar at Chatham.

CG-44328 was purchased by the Royal National Lifeboat Institution in May 1964, and it became the basis for the Waveney-class lifeboat. The Canadian Coast Guard operated 18 lifeboats acquired in 1966 using United States Coast Guard specifications. Three other craft were obtained in 1975 and 1985 as training vessels. Other international agencies, including the Italian Coast Guard and Norwegian Society for Sea Rescue, have modified and adopted the 44' MLB design.

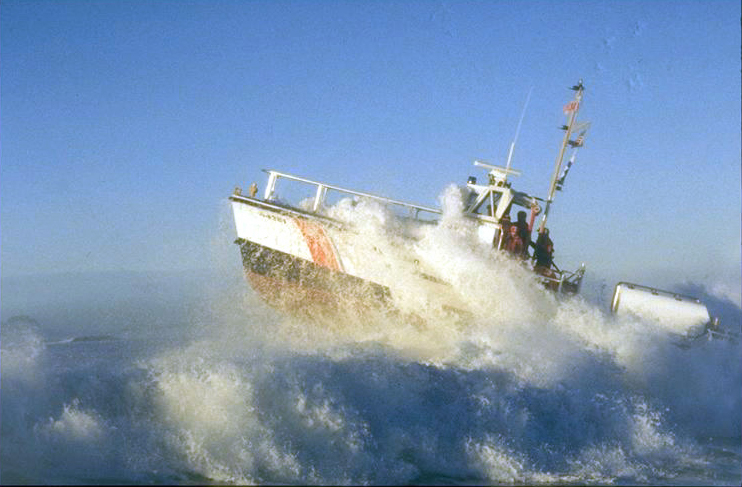
CG-44381 in heavy surf during training at the National Motor Lifeboat School at Cape Disappointment

Over the July 4th weekend of 1980 Richard Dixon, the coxswain of a 44-foot motor lifeboat from the US Coast Guard Station at Tillamook Bay led his crew of four on two separate daring rescues, earning him the rare honor of two separate Coast Guard Medals.

Until February 1997, the Coast Guard never had lost any crew members in nearly 35 years of operation with the 44' MLB. Just after midnight on February 12, CG-44363 was dispatched from Coast Guard Station Quillayute River in La Push, Washington, responding to a distress call from the disabled sailboat Gale Runner near the mouth of the Quillayute River. As the crew of CG-44363 crossed the bar, they sent a radio transmission saying they had capsized and were disoriented; subsequently, after rolling one to three times, three of the four crew were lost overboard. A second 44' MLB, CG-44393, was dispatched from Station Quillayute River to assist and a Eurocopter MH-65 Dolphin helicopter left for the scene from Coast Guard Air Station Port Angeles. After the Dolphin arrived around 2 a.m., its crew rescued the two aboard the sailboat around 2:30 a.m. Despite severe superstructure damage from the rollovers, CG-44363 remained afloat and eventually washed ashore on James Island with its engines still running, where it was spotted around 3:48 a.m. by a helicopter crew on a Sikorsky MH-60 Jayhawk sent from Coast Guard Air Station Astoria; the lone survivor was found nearby, while the other three had drowned.

CG-44363 was cut up for scrap at James Island, and a cast bronze sculpture was placed on the lawn at Station Quillayute River in October as a memorial. In June 1997, an investigative Coast Guard panel concluded the coxswain "[failed] to safely navigate, causing the boat to capsize and founder in the surf conditions", adding the crew should have waited for the surfman on duty.

== See also ==
- Waveney-class lifeboat
- Response Boat – Medium
- 36 foot motor lifeboat
- 47-foot Motor Lifeboat
- 52-foot Motor Lifeboat
- 41-foot Utility Boat, Large
- CCGS CG 117 and CCGS CG 118
