= USS Dictator =

American Ironclad monitor

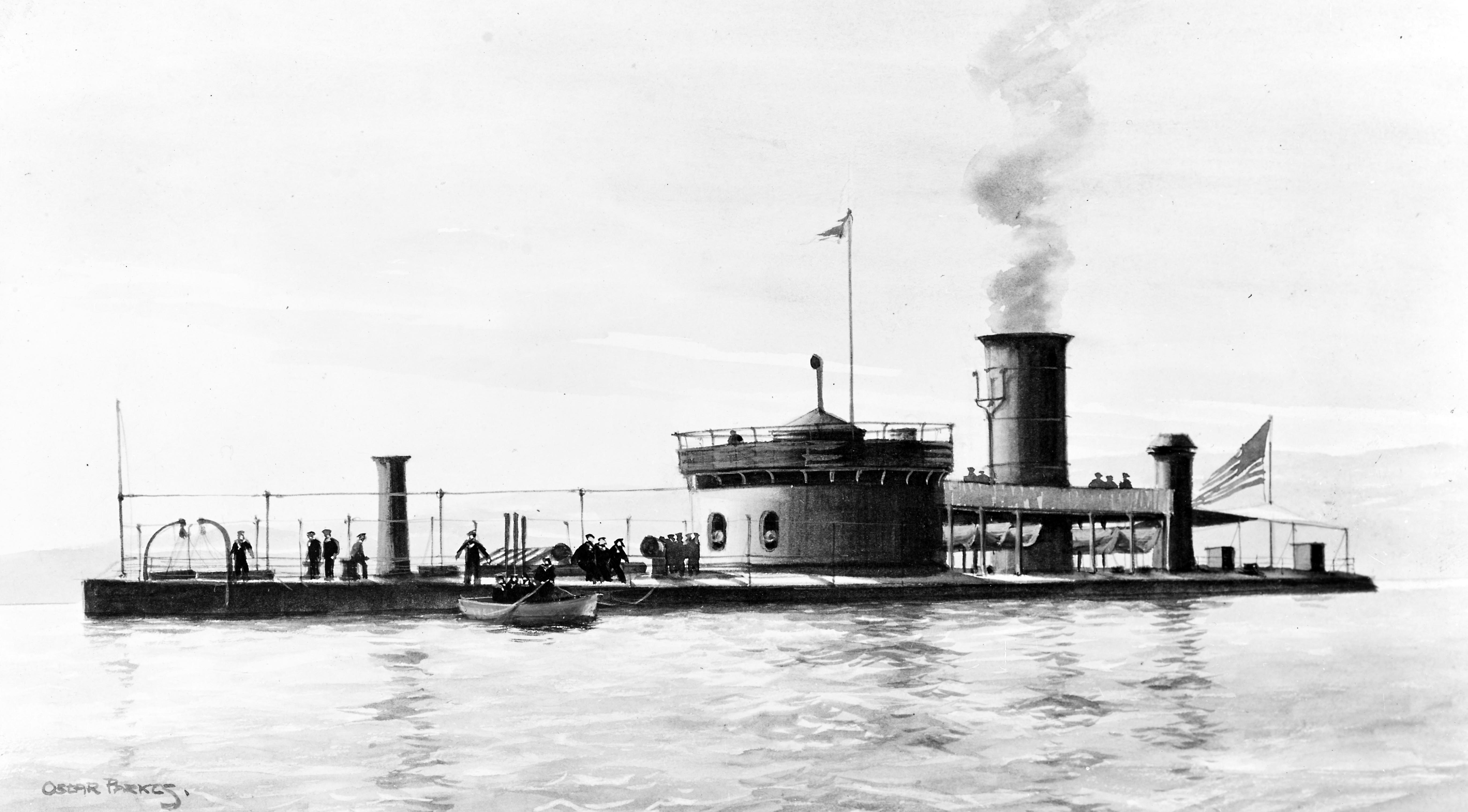

History

United States
- Name: Dictator
- Builder: Delamater Iron Works, New York
- Laid down: 16 August 1862
- Launched: 26 December 1863
- Commissioned: 11 November 1864
- Decommissioned: 1 June 1877
- Stricken: 5 September 1865
- Reinstated: 20 July 1869
- Fate: Sold for scrap, 27 September 1883

General characteristics
- Type: Monitor
- Displacement: 4,438 long tons (4,509 t)
- Length: 312 ft (95.1 m)
- Beam: 50 ft (15.2 m)
- Draft: 20 ft 6 in (6.2 m)
- Installed power: 3,500 ihp (2,600 kW)
- Propulsion: 1 screw; vibrating-lever steam engine
- Speed: 10 knots (18.5 km/h; 11.5 mph)
- Complement: 174 officers and enlisted men
- Armament: 2 × 15 in (381 mm) Dahlgren smoothbores
- Armor: Turret: 15 in (381 mm); Pilothouse: 12 in (305 mm); Hull: 6 in (152 mm); Deck: 1.5 in (38 mm)

USS Dictator was a single-turreted ironclad monitor, designed for speed, and to sail on the open sea. Originally to be named Protector, the Navy Department preferred a more aggressive name, and she was renamed Dictator. Despite her being designed for speed, design problems limited her to a maximum of 10 knots (19 km/h; 12 mph). She served in two different periods; from 1864 to 1865, serving with the North Atlantic Blockading Squadron, and from 1869 to 1877, with the North Atlantic Fleet. After her final decommissioning in 1877, she was sold for scrap in 1883.

== Description ==
Dictator was 312 ft (95.1 m) long, 50 ft (15.2 m) wide, had a draft of 20 ft 6 in (6.2 m), and displaced 4,438 long tons (4,509 t). She had a top speed of 10 knots (18.5 km/h; 11.5 mph), and was propelled by a single screw and a two-cylinder Ericsson vibrating lever-engine, with a total of 3,500 indicated horsepower (2,600 kW). It is thought that she had a light hurricane deck amidships. She was designed to carry 1,000 tons of coal. She was armed with two 15-inch (38 cm) Dahlgren smoothbore guns. She had 15 inches of armor on the turret, 12 in (305 mm) on the pilothouse, 6 in (152 mm) on the hull, and 1.5 in (38 mm) on the deck. She had a crew of 174 men.

== Service history ==
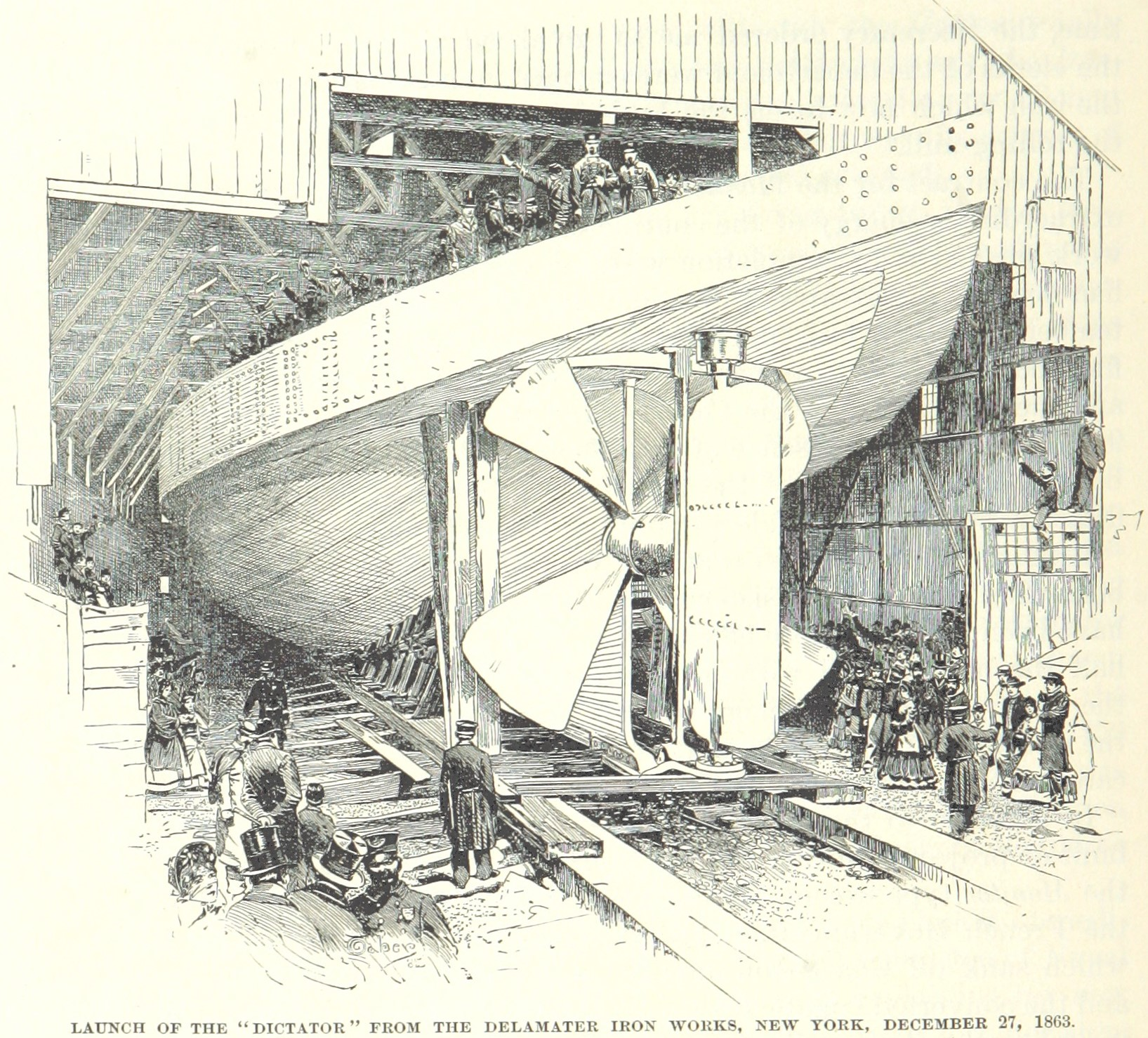
The launch of Dictator

Originally she was to be called Protector, however she was named Dictator on 1 April 1862, after John Ericsson requested it from the Assistant Secretary of the Navy, Gustavus Fox.

Dictator was laid down by Delamater Iron Works, in New York, New York, under contract with John Ericsson on 16 August 1862, and launched on 26 December 1863. The ship was commissioned on 11 November 1864, under the command of Commander John Rodgers, with a crew of 174.

Construction problems with her powerplant kept her initial service relatively brief and inactive. Assigned to duty with North Atlantic Blockading Squadron, Dictator cruised on the Atlantic coast from 15 December 1864 until placed out of commission on 5 September 1865 at the League Island Navy Yard. She remained in ordinary there until 1869.

The ship was recommissioned on 20 July 1869, with a repair cost of $59,654.27. Dictator served with the North Atlantic Fleet until 28 June 1871 when she was again placed out of commission. She was in ordinary at New York Navy Yard until 12 January 1874 when she was recommissioned for service on the North Atlantic Station. Dictator was decommissioned at League Island on 1 June 1877 and remained there until sold on 27 September 1883, to A. Purvis & Son, for a cost of $40,250.

== Sources ==
=== Books ===
- Silverstone, Paul H. (2006). Civil War Navies: 1855–1883. New York: Routledge. ISBN 978-0-415-97870-5.
- Tucker, Spencer C.; Pierpaoli, Paul G.; White, William E. (2011). The Civil War Naval Encyclopedia. Santa Barbara, California: ABC-CLIO. ISBN 978-1-59884-338-5.
- Fuller, Howard J. (2014). Empire, Technology and Seapower: Royal Navy Crisis In The Age of Palmerston. Hoboken, New Jersey: Taylor and Francis. ISBN 978-1-134-20045-0.

=== Websites ===
- "Guide to the Naval History Society Collection 1721–1995 (bulk 1781–1936) MS 439". dlib.nyu.edu. Archived from the original on 2 July 2018.
- "Dictator". www.history.navy.mil.

=== Journals ===
- Fuller, Howard J. (December 2005). ""A Portentous Spectacle": The Monitor U.S.S. Miantonomoh Visits England" (PDF). International Journal of Naval History. 4 (3): 1–23. Archived from the original (PDF) on 5 September 2015.
