= John Friedrich (fraudster) =

Australian conman (1950–1991)

- John Friedrich c. 1988
- Born: Johann Friedrich Hohenberger; 7 September 1950; Munich, West Germany
- Died: 27 July 1991 (aged 40); Sale, Victoria, Australia
- Cause of death: Suicide
- Occupations: Engineer and executive director of the National Safety Council of Australia
- Criminal charge: Fraud involving over AUD$297 million

Johann Friedrich Hohenberger OAM (7 September 1950 – 27 July 1991), also known as John Friedrich, was executive director of the National Safety Council of Australia (Victorian Division) during the 1980s. He was the subject of Victoria's biggest fraud case and known as "Australia's greatest conman".

== Early life ==
Hohenberger was born on 7 September 1950 in Munich, West Germany. He was the second of two sons born to Elisabeth (née Wehner) and Johann Christian Hohenberger.

Hohenberger was a West German national. In August 1972, Hohenberger began working as an independent contractor with the German road construction company Strassen und Teerbau. Around July 1974, he forged road building orders from distant mountain towns and used them to order Strassen und Teerbau to build roads. No roads were ever built, and no earthworks or materials were ever bought. Hohenberger embezzled 300,000 DM from the company.

Hohenberger was on a skiing holiday in Italy at the time German police issued a warrant for his arrest. He never returned to Germany; having gone out onto the slopes and not returned, he was presumed to have died. Although German police were sceptical of his disappearance, believing that somebody had tipped him off to the investigation, the discovery of his bags over a year later reinforced the theory that he had either had an accident or committed suicide.

== Move to Australia ==
On 20 January 1975, Hohenberger arrived in Melbourne on a flight from Auckland, New Zealand. According to Department of Immigration records, Hohenberger left Australia on a flight to Singapore on 22 January. It is thought he tricked Australian Customs into believing he had boarded a plane but remained in Australia.

Using the name John Friedrich and fake qualifications, Hohenberger gained a contract with construction company Codelfa Cogefar, working on part of the Melbourne underground rail loop. He subsequently worked for the Board of Ecumenical Missions and Relations (BOEMAR), a Uniting Church in Australia organisation responsible for the Church's Aboriginal missions. He was offered the position of community adviser at Ernabella in South Australia, where he was to assist the Aboriginal community with its development and to supervise civil works.

While working in Ernabella, Friedrich became ill with a serious infection and was treated by nurse Shirley Manning. Friedrich and Manning became engaged in October 1975 and married on 10 February 1976 in Sydney. They moved to the BOEMAR mission on Mornington Island, where Shirley was to work as a nursing sister and John as the manager. During his time on Mornington, Friedrich was responsible to the Australian Government as well as to the Church. While the Church was only concerned with the day-to-day running of the island, as an agent of the government, Friedrich acted as a coastal watcher for the Royal Australian Navy, a fisheries officer, a licensee for the government-owned pub, an agent for a shipping company and the airline that serviced the island, and a reporting officer for the Department of Civil Aviation. Friedrich began studying again while at Mornington, working on an external master's degree in engineering science with the University of Queensland. The Friedrichs resigned from BOEMAR in late 1976 but stayed to oversee relief opportunities until January 1977 after Cyclone Ted destroyed 90 per cent of all buildings on the island.

== National Safety Council ==
In November 1976, the Friedrichs took a holiday to Victoria. While there, having seen an advertisement in The Age, Friedrich applied for the position of safety engineer with the National Safety Council of Australia (NSCA) Victorian Division, to be based at the State Electricity Commission of Victoria (SECV) Yallourn Power Station in the Latrobe Valley. Upon returning to Mornington, Friedrich was informed that the job at Yallourn was his if he wanted it. Friedrich began working for the NSCA in January 1977.

Friedrich became executive director of NSCA in 1982 and began to transform it into a national search and rescue organisation. He built up the company with loans from 27 banks that agreed to lend millions of dollars to NSCA with little more surety than Friedrich's word. McGregor-Lowndes attributes this lack of probity to the halo effect of NSCA and Friedrich himself. In 1988, he was awarded the Medal of the Order of Australia (OAM) "in recognition of service to the community, particularly in the area of industrial safety and search and rescue services".

Following the financial collapse of NSCA in 1989, Friedrich went into hiding. After a nationwide and international manhunt, involving all Australian police forces and Interpol, he was arrested in Perth on 6 April 1989. He was initially charged with one count of obtaining financial advantage by deception. On 1 November, he was charged on a further 91 counts of obtaining property by deception.

In subsequent investigations, it was discovered that Friedrich was not an Australian citizen, did not possess any valid birth certificate, and did not appear on any electoral roll. This caused considerable embarrassment to the Department of Defence, which had given him a security clearance and almost unlimited access to Royal Australian Air Force bases.

The Friedrichs lived with Shirley's brother in Sydney until the start of the trial. On 23 July 1991, Friedrich appeared in court for fraud involving $297 million.

== Death ==
On 27 July 1991, Friedrich was found dead in a muddy field on his farm near Sale, Victoria, with a single gunshot wound to the head. His death was ruled to be suicide.

== Autobiography ==
Friedrich was writing an autobiography with the assistance of Richard Flanagan at the time of his death. It was published posthumously. In it, he claimed to have been born in South Australia in 1945 to German parents, attended boarding school in West Germany and studied engineering at the Technische Hochschule. Friedrich also claimed that, while working for an American construction company, he was recruited by the Central Intelligence Agency and, under the codename "Iago", worked in Laos, Vietnam, Egypt, New Zealand and West Germany against far left-wing extremists before returning to Australia in 1975. Simon Caterson, writing in The Australian, described it as "one of the least reliable but most fascinating memoirs in the annals of Australian publishing". A subsequent 2017 essay by Caterson likening Friedrich to Jeff Tracy is titled "John Friedrich: Australia's Most Altruistic Fraudster".
