= Defensor =

Defensor (Latin, 'one who defends') may refer to:

== Arts, entertainment and media ==
- Defensor (comics), a Marvel character
- Defensor (Transformers), a character in the media franchise

== People ==
- Defensor, a monk, compiler of the early medieval anthology Liber Scintillarum
- Arthur Defensor Sr. (born 1941), a Filipino politician
- Arthur Defensor Jr. (born 1969), a Filipino politician
- Matias Defensor Jr. (born 1943), a Filipino politician
- Mike Defensor (born 1969), a Filipino politician
- Miriam Defensor Santiago (1945–2016), a Filipino academic, lawyer and statesman

== Sports ==
- Defensor Arica, a Peruvian football club
- Defensor Casablanca, a Chilean Football club
- Defensores de Belgrano, an Argentine sports club
- Defensores de Belgrano de Villa Ramallo, an Argentine sports club
- Defensores de Cambaceres, an Argentine football club
- Defensor La Bocana, a Peruvian football club
- Defensor Lima, a Peruvian football club
- Defensor San Alejandro, a Peruvian football club
- Defensor San José, a Peruvian football club
- Defensor Sporting, a sports club in Uruguay
- Defensores Unidos, an Argentine football club
- Defensor Villa del Mar, a Peruvian football club
- Defensor Zarumilla, a Peruvian football club

== Other ==
- Defensor civitatis, a Roman office
- Defensor matrimonii ('defender of the bond') a Catholic Church official
- Defensor pacis ('defender of peace'), a 1324 tract by Marsilius of Padua about popular sovereignty
  - Defensor minor, written around 1342
- Defensor Fortis, motto of United States Air Force Security Forces
- Fidei defensor ('defender of the faith'), a phrase used as part of the full style of many monarchs and heads of state

== See also ==
- Defender (disambiguation)
- Protector (disambiguation)
