= National Safety Council of Australia =

Nonprofit organisation

National Safety Council of Australia Ltd
- Company type: Company limited by guarantee
- Industry: Occupational health and safety (current); Search and rescue (former)
- Founded: 23 May 1927
- Headquarters: Melbourne, Australia
- Area served: Australia
- Website: www.nscafoundation.org.au

The National Safety Council of Australia is a nonprofit organisation in Australia promoting safety awareness and offering consulting, auditing and training services. For much of its life, NSCA was a volunteer organisation concerned largely with accident prevention. In the 1980s it expanded rapidly to become a national search and rescue organisation, until the financial collapse of its Victorian Division in 1989. It subsequently returned to being a small scale non-profit organisation promoting safety awareness and occupational health and safety training, consulting and auditing. NSCA hosts the National Safety Awards of Excellence and a variety of events for OHS (Occupational health and safety) professionals.

== Early history ==
The National Safety Council of Australia was formed in Victoria in May 1927 from a coalition of 52 organisations concerned with safety, and commonly referred to as National Safety Council, or NSC. The idea was originally proposed by the Royal Automobile Club of Victoria to reduce road accidents, but was "extended to provide for greater safety of all classes of the public at work, on the road, and in the home". Member organisations included state government agencies, insurers, trade unions, city councils and other nonprofit organisations such as the Royal Life Saving Society Australia. Its scope initially focused on road safety, sea safety and industrial safety.

Although formed as a company limited by guarantee, it was granted an exemption by the state Attorney-General from using the word "Limited" in the name. It was also granted exemptions from lodging audited annual financial statements, changes to office bearers or lists of members. Such exemptions were generally available to companies whose purpose was charitable in nature.

In 1929, it began broadcasting weekly safety lectures on radio. Prominent speakers included the Chief Commissioner of the Victoria Police, the chief officer of the Metropolitan Fire Brigade, the chairman of the Royal Life Saving Society and the Chief Commissioner of the Victorian Railways.

In August 1946, it held its first national safety convention in Adelaide.

== Expansion ==
John Friedrich, executive director of NSCA Victorian Division 1982-1989

From 1982, the NSCA expanded its activities nationally, and began to include dealing with the consequences of accidents, including accident investigations and performing industrial rescue operations. This change was led largely by its new Victorian Division executive director John Friedrich.

Friedrich joined NSCA Victorian Division in January 1977 as a safety engineer, and was appointed executive director in 1982. At the time, NSCA was largely run by volunteers. Following the Ash Wednesday fires in 1983, Friedrich saw the opportunity to transform NSCA into a search and rescue organisation. Over the subsequent six years, NSCA purchased a considerable amount of equipment, and established a network of bases around Australia.

By 1989, it employed 430 people, who were known colloquially as "The Thunderbirds" after the television series of the same name, and had an annual operating budget of A$90 million. It amassed an impressive array of equipment including ships, aircraft, helicopters, trained rescue dogs, satellite communications, parachute rescue teams and even a mini submarine. As well as search and rescue, its staff were trained in fire fighting, and many of its rescue helicopters were fitted with belly tanks for aerial firefighting.

NSCA operational personnel were given ranks and insignia equivalent to fire fighters. It regularly conducted joint training with emergency services, the Royal Australian Navy and Royal Australian Air Force. It provided search and rescue services for the Royal Australian Air Force, state and federal governments and industry. By the late 1980s, NSCA had more advanced search and rescue equipment than Australian Defence Force and there were reports that personnel received weapons training. (Note: Some rescue personnel did receive safe handling of firearms training but were never armed. NSCA did apply to issue rifles and shotguns to personnel based at Townsville, Darwin and Tindal to protect themselves against crocodiles, but the application was rejected.) As a result, it was widely believed to be a government-backed or paramilitary organisation. The State Bank of Victoria wrote in an internal memo that "NSCA's status (nonprofit-making and tax exempt) and its role as a provider of community service in the fields of health, safety and emergency services render it for practical purposes a quasi government body."

== Bases ==
At its peak in 1989, NSCA operated out of the following locations, either shared with other organisations or from purpose-built bases.

- Victoria
  - Melbourne
    - Corporate headquarters
    - Essendon Airport
    - Moorabbin Airport
  - Portland
  - CFA Training College, Fiskville
  - Horsham
  - Benalla
  - Morwell
  - West Sale
  - Port Welshpool
- New South Wales
  - Shellharbour Airport
  - Sydney
  - Newcastle
  - RAAF Base Williamtown
- South Australia
  - RAAF Base Edinburgh
- Queensland
  - Coolangatta Airport
  - RAAF Base Townsville
- Tasmania
  - Hobart
  - Cambridge Aerodrome
- Northern Territory
  - RAAF Base Darwin
  - RAAF Base Tindal

== Ships ==
- MV Blue Nabilla (1984–1990)

NSCA also had a fleet of unnamed rigid-hulled inflatable boats.

== Aircraft ==
NSCA operated a fleet of aircraft and helicopters including the Beechcraft B200C Super King Air, Dornier 228, GAF Nomad N22B, Hughes 500D, Bell UH-1 Iroquois, Bell 205A, Bell 212 and Bell 412.

== Collapse ==
On 21 December 1988, the Victorian Division of NSCA advised the Board that further information was required to complete current year's audit, and would need to modify its audit reports for the previous three years. The board appointed chartered accountants to investigate the Division's accounting procedures. The accountants reported that many of the financial records were fraudulent.

There were also concerns about assets reported on the books as "containerised safety equipment", which had been used as surety against multimillion-dollar loans. The accountants discovered that most of the containers on the books did not exist. Those that did exist were of inferior quality, sold by the supplier for use as garden sheds, and empty.

A thorough investigation of finances revealed that the company was insolvent, and owed A$300 million to major Australian banks. The company was placed into liquidation, and the liquidators sued the auditors in Australia's largest audit compensation claim. The Commonwealth Bank sued Friedrich and other directors of the company.

Victorian Division Executive director John Friedrich resigned, and went into hiding. A warrant was issued for his arrest on suspicion of fraud. A nationwide manhunt received near saturation media coverage. Friedrich was arrested in Perth on 6 April 1989, and extradited to Victoria. He was initially charged with one count of obtaining financial advantage by deception. On 1 November 1989, he was charged on a further 91 counts of obtaining property by deception.

Friedrich attempted to suppress publication of details about the collapse, but Supreme Court of Victoria ruled it was in the public interest.

== Aftermath ==
The Victorian Commission for Corporate Affairs conducted an investigation into NSCA's finances, and addressed the wider issue of exemptions for non-profit companies. It recommended that exemptions on reporting be dropped, although the exemption from using the word Limited in the title was retained. This was backed up by a major restructure of Australian corporate law, which came into effect on 1 January 1991.

On 27 July 1991, John Friedrich was found dead on his farm near Sale, Victoria, with a single gunshot to the head. His death was ruled to be suicide. It was discovered that he was not an Australian citizen. This caused considerable embarrassment to the Department of Defence, which had given Friedrich a security clearance and almost unlimited access to RAAF bases. A subsequent investigation by the Department of Immigration found that Friedrich's real name was Johann Friedrich Hohenberger, a citizen of West Germany, who was wanted in that country on fraud charges.

== Today ==
The NSCA is now a membership-based organisation promoting safety awareness, and providing occupational safety and health training, consulting and auditing. The NSCA has offices throughout Australia in the major capital cities, as well as in regional locations such as Gladstone and Newcastle. Its patron in 2011 was Quentin Bryce, who was the Governor-General of Australia from 2008 to 2014.
