= CCGS CG 117 =

History

Canada
- Name: 117
- Operator: Canadian Coast Guard
- Builder: Eastern Equipment Ltd., Montreal
- Yard number: CCGC - 1
- Launched: 1975
- Completed: 1975
- Commissioned: 1975
- Decommissioned: 2011
- In service: 1975–2011
- Out of service: 2011
- Home port: CCG Base Sydney
- Identification: CG2614
- Fate: Sold

General characteristics
- Type: Specialty Vessel – Training Vessel
- Displacement: 20 grt
- Length: 13.45 m (44 ft 2 in)
- Beam: 3.9 m (12 ft 10 in)
- Draft: 1.52 m (5 ft 0 in)
- Propulsion: 2 Detroit Series 53 diesel engines
- Speed: 16 knots (30 km/h; 18 mph)
- Range: 150 nmi (280 km; 170 mi)
- Endurance: 1 day
- Complement: 3

CCGS CG 117 was one of three training vessels of the Canadian Coast Guard and located at the Canadian Coast Guard College in Westmount, Nova Scotia. The ship is based on the 44-foot Motor Lifeboat, a converted self-righting lifeboat and variant of the Waveney class lifeboat. It was sold in 2011.

== See also ==
- CCGS CG 118 – sister boat and retired training vessel for the Canadian Coast Guard
- CCGS Goéland
- CCGS CG117 - a song about the boat by David Lance Morgan
