= CCGS CG 118 =

History

Canada
- Name: 118
- Operator: Canadian Coast Guard
- Builder: Eastern Equipment Ltd., Montreal
- Yard number: CCGC - 2
- Launched: 1975
- Completed: 1975
- Commissioned: 1975
- In service: 1975–2011
- Out of service: 2011
- Stricken: 2011
- Home port: CCG Base Sydney
- Status: sold

General characteristics
- Type: Specialty Vessel – Training Vessel
- Displacement: 20 grt
- Length: 13.45 m (44 ft 2 in)
- Beam: 3.65 m (12 ft 0 in)
- Draft: 0.98 m (3 ft 3 in)
- Propulsion: 2 Detroit Series 53 diesel engines
- Speed: 16 knots (30 km/h; 18 mph)
- Range: 150 nmi (280 km; 170 mi)
- Endurance: 1 day
- Complement: 3

CCGS CG 118 is one of three training vessels of the Canadian Coast Guard and located at the Canadian Coast Guard College in Westmount, Nova Scotia. The ship is based on the 44-foot motor lifeboat, a converted self-righting lifeboat similar to the Waveney-class lifeboat.

== See also ==
- CCGS Goéland
- CCGS CG 117
