= Protektor =

Protektor may refer to:

- Protector (2009 film) (Czech: Protektor), a 2009 Czech film
- MV Protektor, a bulk cargo ship which sank in the North Atlantic Ocean in January 1991

== See also ==
- Protector (disambiguation)
