= HMS Protector =

Seven ships of the British Royal Navy have been called HMS Protector:

- HMS Protector (1749), a 44-gun fifth rate listed in 1749 that served in India and was wrecked on 1 January 1776 by a cyclone near Pondicherry.
- Protector, a fireship in service in 1758.
- HMS Protector (1805), a 178-ton, 12-gun brig launched on 1 February 1805. Converted to a survey ship in 1817, she was sold for breaking up in 1833.
- Protector, a Britomart-class gunboat laid down at Portsmouth in 1861 and cancelled on 12 December 1863.
- HMS Protector (A146), a net layer launched in 1936 and converted to an Antarctic patrol ship in 1955. Sold in 1970 for breaking up.
- HMS Protector (P244), a patrol vessel launched as the commercial vessel Seaforth Saga in 1975, purchased by the Royal Navy in 1983 and sold in 1987.
- HMS Protector (A173), the Antarctic patrol ship (ex-MV Polarbjørn); chartered in 2011 and purchased in 2013 as a replacement for HMS Endurance.

== See also ==
- HCS Protector (1751) was launched at Rotherhithe for the British East India Company as a warship to deter pirates and the French Company in Indian waters. A monsoon wrecked her in 1761 while she lay at anchor in Pondicherry Roads.
- HMAS Protector, ships of the Royal Australian Navy
- HMCS Protector, a former naval base of the Royal Canadian Navy
- HMCS Protecteur, a ship of the Royal Canadian Navy
- HMC Protector, a cutter of the UK Border Force
