= El Protector =

El Protector may refer to:

- IWRG El Protector, an annual lucha libre tournament
  - El Protector (2012)
  - El Protector (2013)
- Torrente 3: El protector, a 2005 Spanish black comedy film

== See also ==
- Protector (disambiguation)
