= HMAS Protector (ASR 241) =

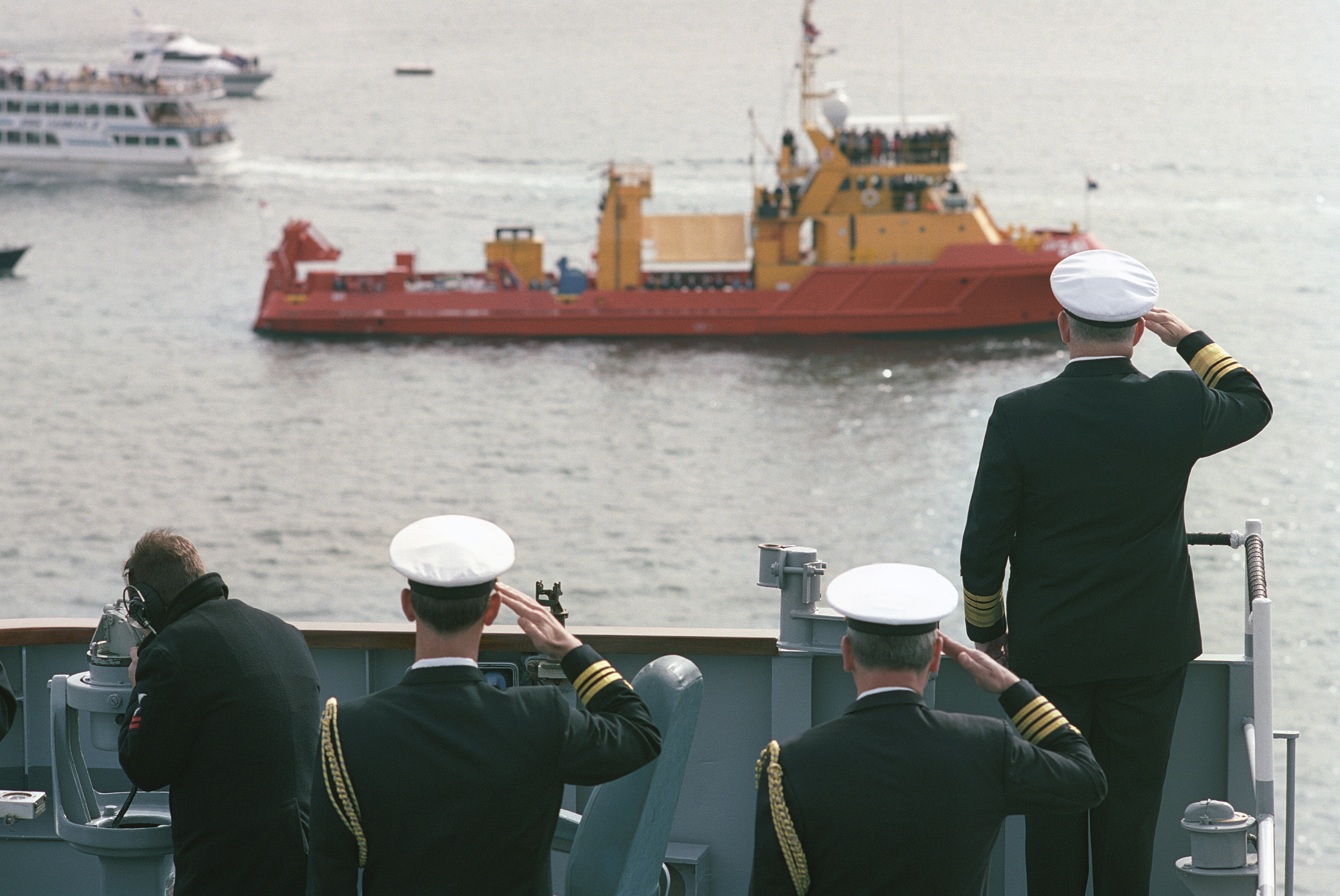
- HMAS Protector in 1992

History

Australia
- Name: Protector
- Builder: Stirling Marine Services, WA
- Christened: 1984 as MV Blue Nabilla
- Acquired: 18 October 1990
- Commissioned: November 1990
- Decommissioned: 1998
- Renamed: 1990
- Honours and awards: Two inherited battle honours
- Status: Sold to Defence Maritime Services

History

Australia
- Name: Seahorse Horizon
- Owner: Defence Maritime Services
- Acquired: 1998
- In service: 1998
- Out of service: 2018
- Home port: HMAS Creswell
- Identification: IMO number: 8406200
- Status: Sold as of 2018

General characteristics
- Displacement: 670 tons full load
- Length: 42.7 m (140 ft)
- Beam: 9.5 m (31 ft)
- Draught: 4 m (13 ft)
- Propulsion: 2 Detroit 12V-92TA diesels; 2,440 hp (1.82 MW) sustained; 2 Heimdal controllable pitch propellers
- Speed: 11.5 knots (21.3 km/h; 13.2 mph)
- Range: 10,000 nautical miles (19,000 km; 12,000 mi) at 11 knots (20 km/h; 13 mph)
- Endurance: 14 days
- Complement: 6 civilian or 9 navy (for training)
- Sensors & processing systems: Navigation Radar: JRC 310 I-band. Decca RM 970BT I-band. Sonar:Klein side scan.
- Aviation facilities: Helicopter platform (removed 1992)

HMAS Protector (ASR 241) was a Royal Australian Navy (RAN) trials and submarine rescue ship. Built in 1984, the ship was initially operated by the National Safety Council of Australia as MV Blue Nabilla. She was purchased by the RAN in 1990 for use as a surveillance, training, and diving support vessel. During her military career, Protector supported the trials of the Collins-class submarines, and was involved in a search for the shipwreck of the World War II cruiser HMAS Sydney. The ship was decommissioned in 1998 and, while still owned by the Commonwealth, she is provided to Defence Maritime Services to allow them to support Navy activities under contract. Renamed Seahorse Horizon, the ship is operated by Defence Maritime Services out of HMAS Creswell as a training and Fleet support vessel.

== Construction ==
The ship was constructed by Stirling Marine Services in Western Australia, and was completed in 1984.

== Operational history ==
She operated as MV Blue Nabilla for the National Safety Council of Australia until 1990.

The ship was purchased by the RAN on 18 October 1990, fitted with a LIPS dynamic positioning system, two Remotely Operated Vehicles and a recompression chamber. She was commissioned as HMAS Protector in November 1990. She supported the Collins-class submarine trials and acceptance process from 1992. On 10 June 1995, Protector was slightly damaged when a switchboard malfunction aboard HMAS Collins caused the submarine to ram the trials ship. The vessel also performed in the surveillance, training, and diving support roles.

During 1997, Protector undertook a brief and unsuccessful search for the remains of the World War II cruiser HMAS Sydney.

When Protector was decommissioned in 1998, she was provided to the RAN's support craft contractor, Defence Maritime Services, for use in the provision of Fleet and training support operating out of HMAS Creswell under the name Seahorse Horizon. In 2002, Seahorse Horizon took part in Exercise Dugong, laying and recovering mines.

In May 2018 Seahorse Horizon was put up for sale to the public by the Commonwealth.
