= HMCS Protecteur =

One ship and one future ship of the Royal Canadian Navy have been named HMCS Protecteur;

- HMCS Protecteur (AOR 509), a Protecteur-class replenishment oiler in service from 1969 to 2015.
- HMCS Protecteur (AOR 520), a Protecteur-class auxiliary vessel launched on 13 December 2024.

== Battle honours ==
Ships named Protecteur have received the following battle honours;

- Gulf and Kuwait
- Arabian Sea

== See also ==
- Protecteur (disambiguation)
