= HMAS Protector =

Two ships of the Royal Australian Navy (RAN) ships have been named HMAS Protector.

- HMAS Protector (1884), a gunboat operated by the South Australian colonial navy and the RAN between 1884 and 1943
- HMAS Protector (ASR 241), a trials ship operated by the RAN between 1990 and 1998, and by Defence Maritime Services from that date

== Battle honours ==
Ships named HMAS Protector are entitled to carry two battle honours:

- China 1900
- Rabaul 1914

== See also ==
- HMS Protector, seven ships of the Royal Navy
- HMCS Protector, a Canadian naval base established at Sydney, Nova Scotia in 1943 and operating until 1965
