= Protector (title) =

Title of historical heads of state

Protector, sometimes spelled protecter, is used as a title or part of various historical titles of heads of state and others in authority. The monarchs of the Zand dynasty (reigned 1751-1794) typically used the title Protector of the People instead of Shahanshah (King of Kings).

== Political and administrative ==
=== Heads of state ===
==== Iran ====
Wakil ar-Ra`aya (rendered as Protector of the People) was a title of the Persian imperial Monarch under the Zand dynasty, as those rulers refused (except the last as noted) the style Shahanshah. The founding ruler of the Zand dynasty adopted the style; it appears that his successors used the same style, although documentation is obscure.

- 1773 - 1 March 1779 Mohammad Karim Khan Zand (b. c.1707 - d. 1779)
- 6 March 1779 - 1779 Abu al-Fath Khan Zand (1st time) (b. 1755 - d. 1787) - jointly with 6 March 1779 - 19 June 1779 Mohammad Ali Khan Zand (b. 1760 - d. 1...)
- 19 June 1779 - 22 August 1779 Abu al-Fath Khan Zand (2nd time)
- 22 August 1779 - 14 March 1781 Mohammad Sadeq Khan Zand (d. 1782)
- 15 March 1781 - 11 February 1785 Ali Morad Khan Zand (d. 1785)
- 12 February 1785 - 17 February 1785 Baqer Khan Khorasakani
- 18 February 1785 - 23 January 1789 Jaafar Khan Zand (d. 1789)
- 23 January 1789 - 10 May 1789 Seyd Morad Khan Zand
- 10 May 1789 - 30 October 1794 Lotf Ali Khan Zand (b. c.1766 - d. 1794); he again adopted the traditional style Shahanshah March 1794 - 30 October 1794

==== Europe ====
- Lord Protector (plural: Lords Protectors) is a title that has been used at times in British constitutional law for the head of state.
- In Iceland, one Sovereign was styled Alls Íslands Verndari og Hæstráðandi til Sjós og Lands ("Protector and supreme authority of all of Iceland on land and sea") 25 June - 22 August 1809 (an intermezzo between Danish Governors styled Stiftamtmadur): Jørgen Jørgensen (b. 1780 - d. 1841; nicknamed Hundadagakonungur "the Dog-Day King").
- In Estonia, State-protector was a common rendering of Riigihoidja, a Head of State and Head of Government, from 24 January 1934 to 24 April 1938 (acting to 3 September 1937). One example of this title's holder is Konstantin Päts (b. 1874 - d. 1956), who was earlier five times State Elder, thereafter the first and only President before the Soviet takeover.
- In Finland (linguistically close to Estonian), State Protector is a common rendering, besides Regent, of two Finnish Heads of State 18 May 1918 - 27 July 1919, the first incumbent being also the last of the previous — untitled — acting heads of state.
- In the Polish–Lithuanian Commonwealth, King Karl X Gustaf of Sweden (b. 1622 - d. 1660) (Polish: Karol X Gustaw), was styled Protektor Rzeczypospolitej in Polish ("Protector of the Republic") as challenger to the duly elected king Jan II Kazimierz during the middle part of his reign (17 January 1649 - 16 September 1668).

==== Americas ====
- in the Dominican Republic: 4 August 1865 - 15 November 1865, his first non-consecutive presidential term: José María Cabral y de Luna (b. 1819 - d. 1899)
- in Haiti: Sylvain Salnave (b. 1826 - d. 1870), one of the three members of the previous Provisional Government, was President 4 May 1867 - 27 December 1869 and Protector of the Republic to 16 June 1867
- in present Nicaragua: on 20 April 1823 general José Anacleto Ordóñez was proclaimed General en Jefe del Ejército, Protector y Libertador de Granada; he acted as head of state (e.g. in a treaty ), but set up a Governing Junta (it's unclear whether he was a member) which continued to govern after Granada's accession to the Central American Federation on July 2
- in Peru: 3 August 1821 - 20 September 1822 general José Francisco de San Martín y Matorras (b. 1778 - d. 1850)
- in the Peru-Bolivian Confederation: José Andrés de Santa Cruz y Villavicencio y Calumana (b. 1792 - d. 1865; Military) Supreme Protector 28 October 1836 - 20 February 1839 (also Bolivian President 24 May 1829 - 20 February 1839)
- in Brazil, 12 October 1822 - 15 November 1889, the imperial style was Imperador Constitucional e Defensor Perpétuo (Constitutional Emperor and perpetual defender)

=== Foreign hegemons ===
==== Napoleonic France ====
- in most of Germany, east of the Rhine, except Prussia, from 25 July 1806 to 19 October 1813, the French Emperor, Napoleon I, bore the additional title of protecteur de la Confédération du Rhin, i.e. Protector of the Confederation of the Rhine, generally known as Rheinbund ('Rhenan League'), uniting the German princes that had bowed to the conqueror. The actual presidency of its diet and council of Kings was held by a German prince, the Fürstprimas ('Prince-primate').
- Bonaparte had a similar position in Switzerland (then called the Helvetic Republic/Swiss Confederation) under French occupation, but there his style was Médiateur de la Confédération Helvétique (Mediator, 1809 - 31 December 1813), while the chairmanship of the Diet (legislative assembly, since 10 March 1803), the acting Head of the Confederation, with the title Landammann der Schweiz (in German)/Landamman de la Suisse (in French)/Landamano della Svizzera (in Italian), fell simply to the chief magistrate of the canton hosting it.

==== Nazi Germany ====
- Nazi Germany was represented by a Reichsprotektor ('Reich protector') in the Czech puppet-state it installed on 16 March 1939 under the explicit name Protektorat Böhmen und Mähren, the "Protectorate of Bohemia and Moravia". (This excluded the ethnically German regions, which were annexed as Reichsgau Sudetenland.) The Reichsprotektor held the real executive power, not the native President and Prime Minister. The German incumbents, after a month under a Military Governor, were:
  - 5 April 1939 – 20 August 1943 Konstantin von Neurath, Freiherr (1873 – 1956) NSDAP
  - 27 September 1941 – 4 June 1942 Reinhard Heydrich (1904 – 1942) NSDAP (acting for Neurath)
  - 27 May 1942 – 28 May 1942 Karl Hermann Frank (1898 – 1946) NSDAP (acting for the mortally wounded Heydrich)
  - 28 May 1942 – 14 October 1943 Kurt Daluege (1897 – 1946) NSDAP (acting [to 5 June 1942] for Heydrich])
  - 14 October 1943 – 8 May 1945 Wilhelm Frick (1877 – 1946) NSDAP
  - 26 April 1945 – 8 May 1945 Ferdinand Schörner (1892 – 1973) (military commander with unrestricted executive power)

==== Fictitious ====
The self-styled Emperor Norton I of the United States included among his titles "Protector of Mexico."

=== Colonial administration ===
- In Spanish America, a Protector of the Indians was to restrain the abuses of the conquistadores at the expense of the indigenous Indios, e.g. granted to the first missionary bishop of Cusco (in Peru).
- In the British Empire, a colonial official responsible for administering the Chinese Protectorates, entities charged with the well-being of ethnic Chinese residents of the British-held Straits Settlements—which included current-day Singapore—during that territory's colonial period.
- In the French empire, the Protecteur des Indigènes 'Protector of the Natives' was a colonial official charged with the protection of an indigenous community; ironically, such 'native' status was also awarded to the (Asian) immigrants -thus officially named- on the island of La Réunion.

== Religious ==
=== Catholic ===
Since the thirteenth century it has been customary at Rome to confide to some particular Cardinal a special solicitude in the Roman Curia for the interests of a given religious order or institute, confraternity, church, college, city, nation, etc. Such a person is known as a Cardinal Protector.

=== Islamic ===
The title Hâdim ül Haramain ish Sharifain or Khādim al-Ḥaramayn al-Sharifayn, Arabic for 'Servant of the Noble Sanctuaries', notably Mecca and Medina (the destinations of the hajj pilgrimage; both in the Grand Sherif's peninsular Arabian territory; the third being Jerusalem, part of an province) was awarded to Sultan Salim Khan I by the Sherif of Mecca in 1517, a year after his conquest of Egypt and assuming of the title of Commander of the Faithful, and Successor of the Prophet of the Lord of the Universe, i.e. Caliph; both remained part of the full style of his successors on the throne.

== See also ==
- Defensor
- Heavenly protector
- Lord Protector (sometimes in the short form Protector)
- Protector of Aborigines
- Protectorate for the use of the word for a state 'protecting' another political entity
- Protectorate of Missions
