= Protector class =

Protector class may refer to:

- Protector (Pacific Forum)-class small patrol boat, 33-metre (108 ft) Hong Kong Police patrol vessel
- Protector-class coastal patrol boat, 27-metre (89 ft) Armed Forces of Malta and Hong Kong Police patrol vessel based on the Damen Stan 2600 design
- Marine Protector-class patrol boat, 27-metre (89 ft) United States Coast Guard patrol vessels based on the Damen Stan 2600 design
- Protector-class inshore patrol vessel, or Lake-class, 55-metre (180 ft) Royal New Zealand Navy patrol vessels
- Protector-class offshore patrol vessel, 85-metre (279 ft) Royal New Zealand Navy patrol vessels

== See also ==
- Protector (ship)
- Protecteur-class replenishment oiler
- Protecteur-class auxiliary vessel
