= 41-foot Utility Boat, Large =

American ship class

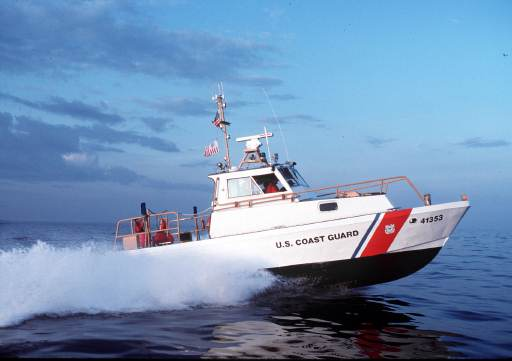
- A USCG 41 ft (12 m) UTB underway

Class overview
- Name: 41-foot Utility Boat
- Builders: Coast Guard Yard, Curtis Bay, Maryland
- Operators: United States Coast Guard
- Succeeded by: Response Boat – Medium
- Built: 1973–1981
- In service: 1973–2014
- Completed: 207 (CG 41300–CG 41507)

General characteristics
- Displacement: 14.25 short tons (13 t)
- Length: 40 ft 8 in (12.40 m)
- Beam: 13 ft 6 in (4.11 m)
- Draft: 4 ft 2 in (1.27 m)
- Propulsion: 2 × Cummins diesel engines, 560 bhp (418 kW), 2 shafts
- Speed: 26 knots (48 km/h; 30 mph)
- Complement: 3

The USCG Ohio Boat, or UTB was a standard utility boat used by the United States Coast Guard for a variety of inshore and offshore missions.

By 2014 all boats of this class had been retired, and replaced with the larger Response Boat – Medium (RB-M) in the USCG.

== General information ==
The 41 ft (12 m) UTB was designed to operate under moderate weather and sea conditions where its speed and maneuverability made it an ideal platform; however, due to the modified "V" design when the 41ft UTB when operated in a following seaway it had a tendency to be pushed to the starboard or port making it difficult when entering an entrance. Overall, the 41ft UTB was a vast improvement over the previous 40ft UTB's as the previous UTB's offered little to no protection from the sun, sea and wind conditions for the crew.

The boats were welded 5086 aluminum, with a molded fiberglass superstructure and twin Cummins diesel engines with conventional shafts and propellers. They were capable of light towing, and were originally fitted with demountable fire monitors. Typical boat crew was three.

207 boats were constructed at the Coast Guard Yard in Baltimore, Maryland, from 1972 to 1981. These boats replaced the Utility Boat-Large (40 feet) - Mark I, Mark IV, Mark V, and VI, which were also built by the Coast Guard's Curtis Bay Yard over the period 1950 to 1966.

As of 2005 there were 172 operational boats. Beginning in 2008, these aging boats were retired and replaced with the Response Boat-Medium over a 6–10 year period. The last active boat, CG-41410 from Station Muskegon, was taken out of service in Grand Haven, Michigan on 31 July 2014. The 45-foot Response Boat – Medium is the class' replacement.

== Machinery characteristics ==
- Engine details - (2) Cummins VT-903M, 318 hp at 2600 rpm, 2:1 reduction gears
- Electrical system - 24 volt DC & a 24V to 12V DC to DC converter
- Propeller details - (2) 26" D X 28" P x 2" bore, 4-blade Ni-Al-bronze

== Performance ==
- Speed, maximum at sea state 0 - 26 knots (48 km/h)
- Speed, cruise at sea state 2 - 18 knots (33 km/h) at 2000 rpm
- Fuel capacity (diesel) - 486.8 US gal (1,840 L)
- Range at cruise, sea state 0 - 300 nm (560 km)

== Other data ==
- Cost - $235,000 (1979)

== Incidents and accidents ==
- On 15 November 1977, a 41-foot Utility Boat, Large capsized and sank in heavy surf on the Columbia River Bar at night with 10 students from the Cape Disappointment Motor Lifeboat School, 3 died.
