= Response Boat – Medium =

Utility boat

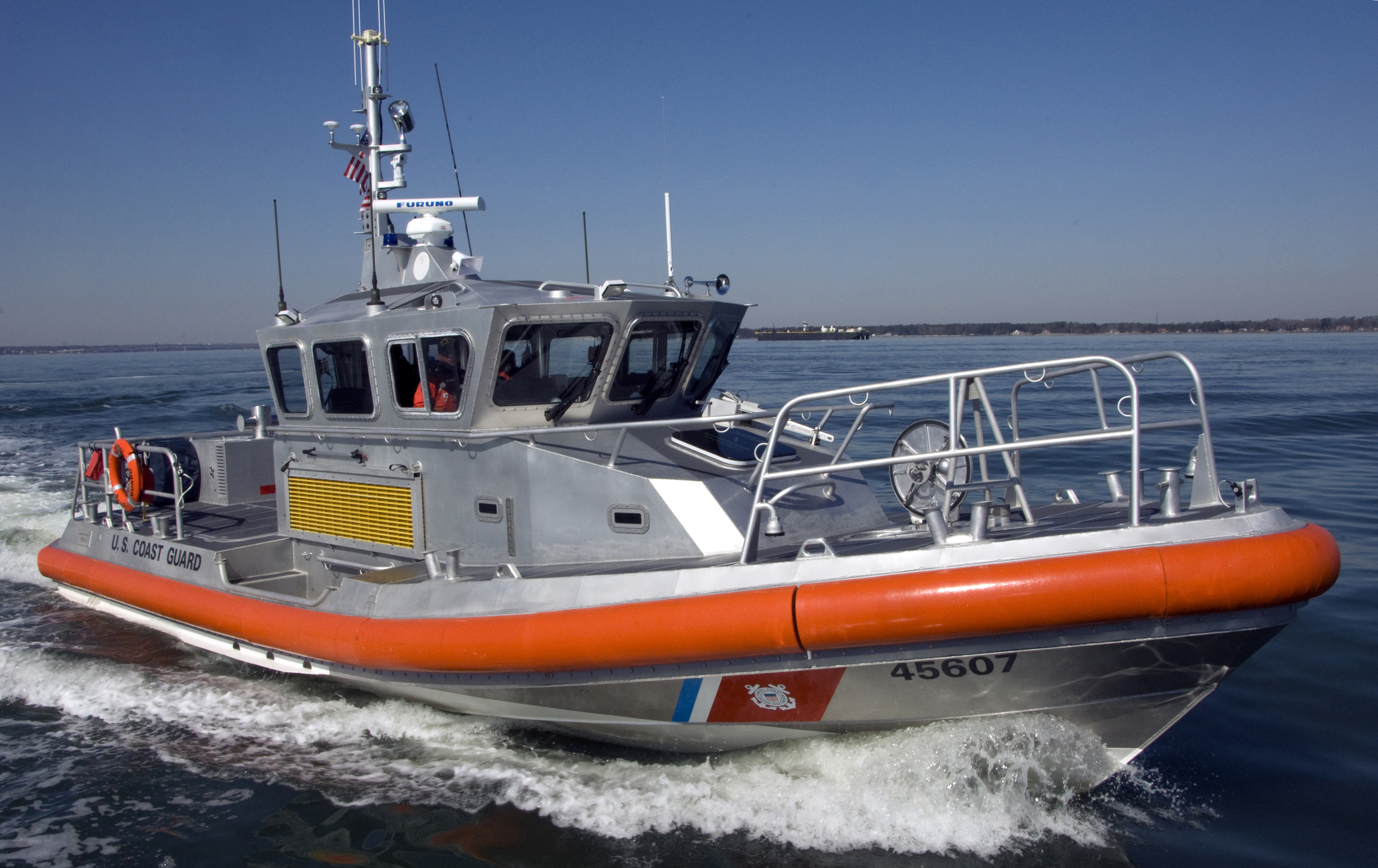
- A US Coast Guard RB-M underway off Yorktown, Virginia

Class overview
- Builders: Marinette Marine Corporation; Kvichak Marine Industries
- Operators: United States Coast Guard; Canadian Coast Guard
- Preceded by: 41-foot Utility Boat, Large
- Planned: 170
- Completed: 174

General characteristics
- Displacement: 16.3 ton
- Length: 44 ft 9 in (13.64 m)
- Beam: 14 ft 7.75 in (4.4641 m)
- Draft: 3 ft 4 in (1.02 m)
- Installed power: 2 × MTU Detroit Diesel turbocharged Series 60 engines, 825 hp (615 kW) total
- Propulsion: 2 × Kongsberg Maritime FF-Series waterjets
- Speed: 30 knots (56 km/h; 35 mph) (cruise); 42.5 knots (78.7 km/h; 48.9 mph) (max)
- Range: 250 nmi (460 km; 290 mi) at 30 knots (56 km/h; 35 mph)
- Complement: 4
- Armament: 2 × M240B general-purpose machine guns

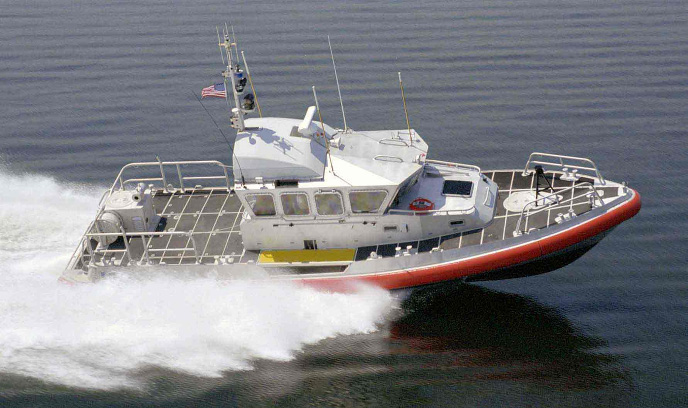
The USCG Response Boat Medium (RBM) has replaced a fleet of 41-foot utility boats (UTBs) that averaged over 30-years of service

The Response Boat – Medium (RB-M) is a 45-foot (14 m) utility boat used by the United States Coast Guard. It is a replacement for the Coast Guard's retired fleet of 41-foot (12 m) utility boats (UTB), which had been in use by the Coast Guard since the 1970s. On June 21, 2006 the USCG awarded the RB-M contract to Marinette Marine of Marinette, Wisconsin and Kvichak Marine Industries of Seattle, Washington. The RB-M was designed by Camarc Design in the UK. Between June of 2006 and March of 2015 Marinette, in Green Bay Wisconsin and Kvichak in Kent, Washington partnered to build and deliver 174 RB-Ms to the USCG. Kvichak developed and delivered several police boat variants to several cities including Seattle and New York.

In the summer of 2017, the Canadian Coast Guard purchased a used 45 RBM from the United States Coast Guard. It is based in Vancouver British Columbia under the name CCGS Laredo Sound.

According to the US Coast Guard, "While primarily a search and rescue asset when the 41' UTB was first fielded, the evolution of missions has increased the requirement to perform many missions including recreational boating safety, marine environmental protection, enforcement of laws and treaties, ports, waterways, and coastal security, and defense operations, including those traditional missions associated with Homeland Security."

On March 17, 2015, the U.S. Coast Guard received the 174th and final RB-M into service.

== General characteristics ==
The boat has a deep-V, double chine hull, which provides a balance of performance and stability. The vessel is self-righting if it capsizes in rough seas. Below the pilot house are six compartments:

- Lazarette
- Auxiliary machinery compartment
- Engine room
- Survivors' Compartment
- Forepeak
- Head

(Sources:)

=== Electronics ===
- FLIR navigator thermal imager
- Furuno scalable integrated navigation system
- Furuno radios
- Gentex LVIS digital intercom system
- Taiyo TD-L1550A VHF Direction Finder
- Motorola 5000 digital mobile radio
- Mount for KY-99 makes RB-M ready for secure communications
- L3 Communications automatic identification system

== Hull numbering ==
In keeping with standard USCG practice, boats of this size have hull numbers and are not named. This type of boat has a hull number beginning with the length of the boat (45′) and then a sequential number. In the case of the RB-M boats, the hull numbers begin with 601. Thus the first boat will be RB-M 45601.

== Boats ==
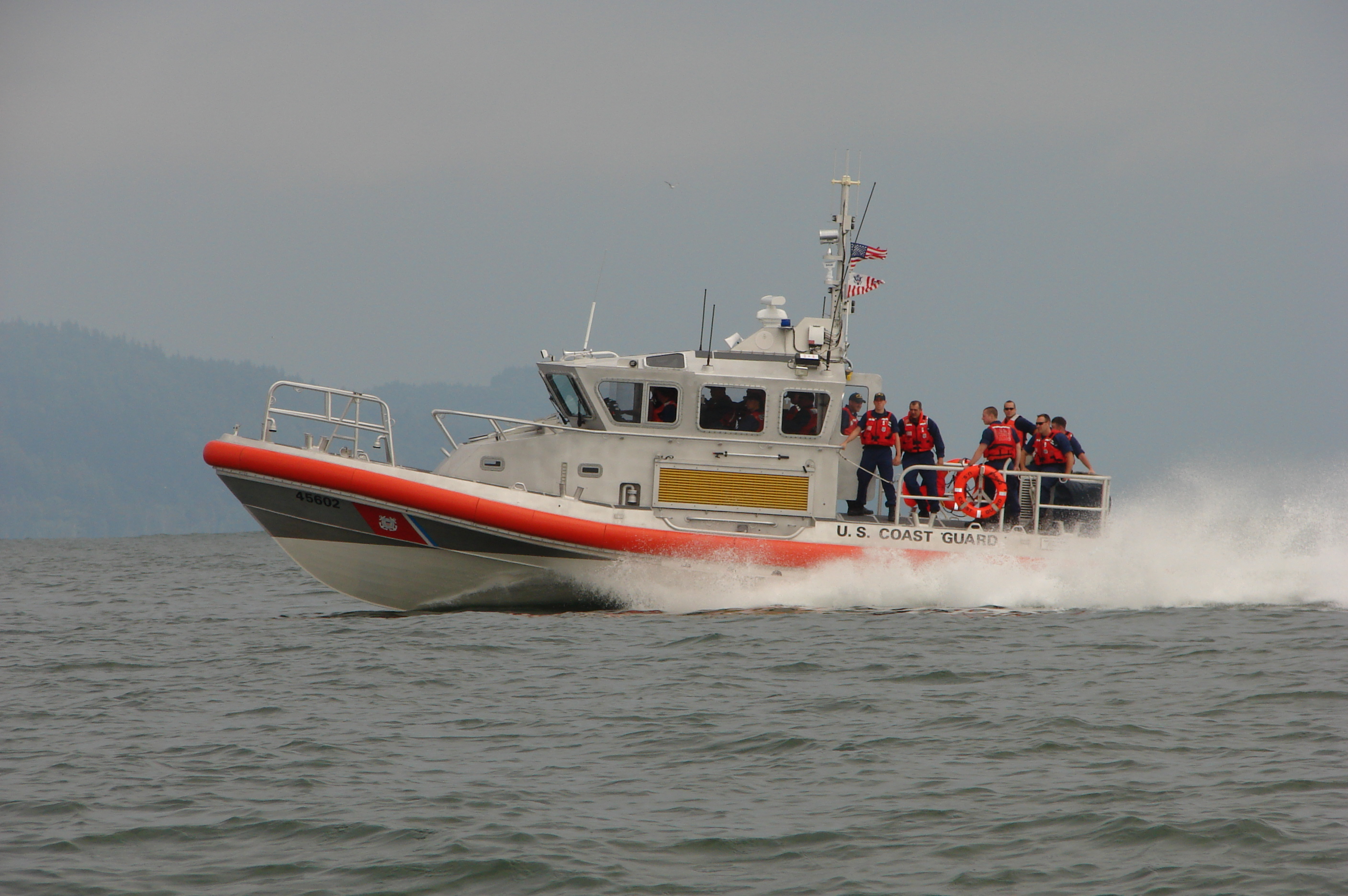
USCG 45602 underway at Cape Disappointment, Washington. August 7, 2008

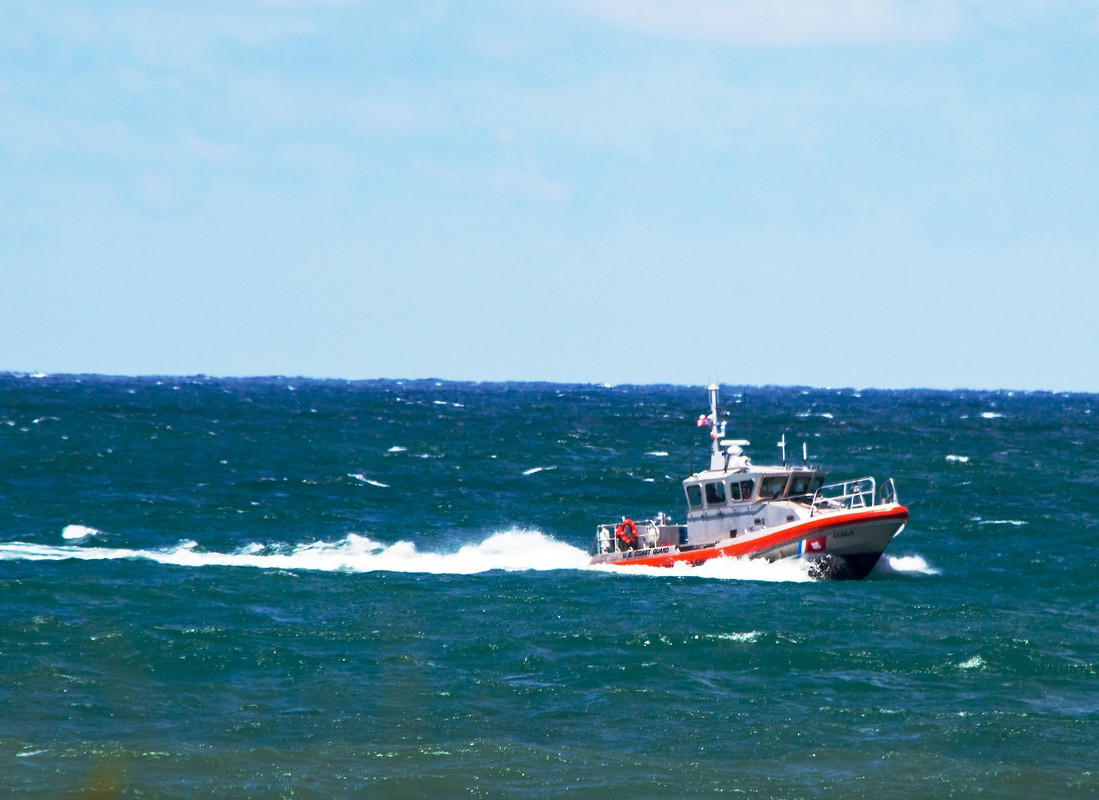
USCG RB-M 45604 patrolling Lake Michigan at Gary, Indiana, during an airshow

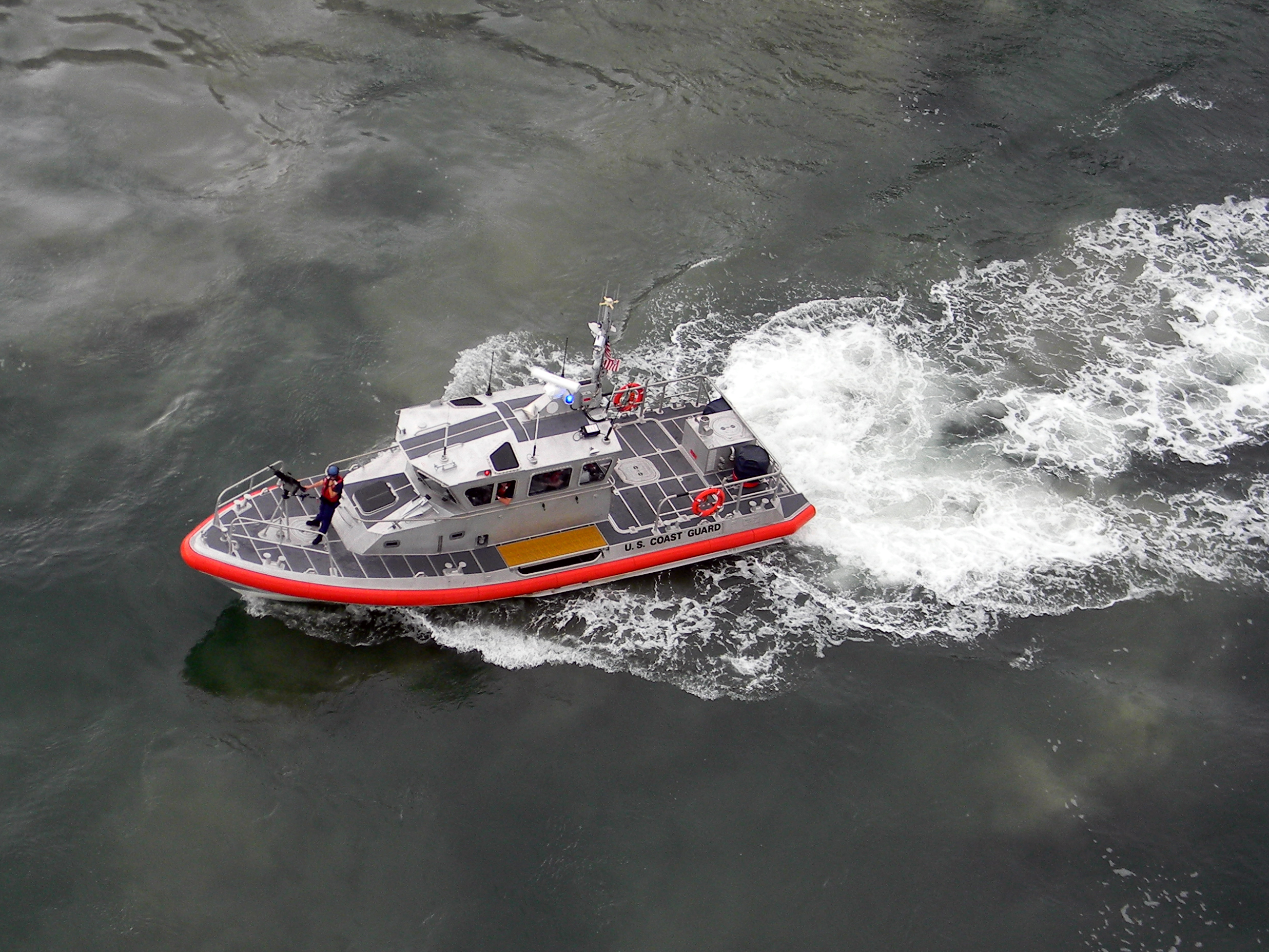
Birds-eye view of a RB-M

| Boat | Station | Delivery date |
|---|---|---|
| 45601 | Little Creek, Virginia | March 2008 |
| 45602 | Cape Disappointment, Washington | August 2008 |
| 45603 | Key West, Florida | October 2008 |
| 45604 | Milwaukee, Wisconsin | October 2008 |
| 45605 | Staten Island, New York | December 2008 |
| 45606 | Port Aransas, Texas | January 2009 |
| 45607 | Yorktown, Virginia | February 2009 |
| 45608 | Boston, Massachusetts | March 2009 |
| 45609 | San Juan, Puerto Rico | May 2009 |
| 45610 | Staten Island, New York | July 2009 |
| 45611 | Port Aransas, Texas | July 2009 |
| 45612 | Staten Island, New York | August 2009 |
| 45613 | Maui, Hawaii | September 2009 |
| 45614 | Staten Island, New York | August 2009 |
| 45615 | Little Creek, Virginia | November 2009 |
| 45616 | Staten Island, New York | December 2009 |
| 45617 | Cortez, Florida | November 2009 |
| 45618 | Galveston, Texas | January 2010 |
| 45619 | Honolulu, Hawaii | March 2010 |
| 45620 | Castle Hill, Rhode Island | November 2009 |
| 45621 | Panama City, Florida | January 2010 |
| 45622 | Staten Island, New York | December 2009 |
| 45623 | St. Petersburg, Florida | June 2010 |
| 45624 | Cleveland Harbor, Ohio | April 2010 |
| 45625 | Lake Worth Inlet, Florida | July 2010 |
| 45626 | Belle Isle, Michigan | April 2010 |
| 45627 | Honolulu, Hawaii | August 2010 |
| 45628 | Duluth, Minnesota | May 2010 |
| 45629 | Castle Hill, Rhode Island | June 2010 |
| 45630 | Galveston, Texas | June 2010 |
| 45631 | Fort Lauderdale, Florida | July 2010 |
| 45632 | Belle Isle, Michigan | August 2010 |
| 45633 | Panama City, Florida | August 2010 |
| 45634 | Fort Pierce, Florida | September 2010 |
| 45635 | Calumet Harbor, Illinois | September 2010 |
| 45636 | New Orleans, Louisiana | September 2010 |
| 45640 | Annapolis, Maryland | November 2010 |
| 45641 | Curtis Bay, Maryland | November 2010 |
| 45643 | Los Angeles/Long Beach, California | December 2010 |
| 45645 | Seattle, Washington | January 2010 |
| 45651 | Los Angeles/Long Beach, California | March 2011 |
| 45652 | Los Angeles/Long Beach, California | March 2011 |
| 45664 | Seattle, Washington | June 2011 |
| 45658 | Seattle, Washington | August 2011 |
| 45690 | Buffalo, New York | May 2012 |
| 45703 | Essexville, Michigan | October 2012 |
| 45721 | Charlevoix, Michigan | April 2013 |
| 45723 | Youngstown, New York | May 2013 |
| 45744 | Hobucken, North Carolina | 2014 |
| 45745 | Hudgins, Virginia | February 2014 |
| 45742 | Crisfield, Maryland | |
| 45749 | Port Angeles, Washington | |
| 45754 | St. Joseph, Michigan | May 2014 |
| 45771 | Destin, Florida | 2015 |
| 45772 | Charleston, South Carolina | 2015 |
| 45773 | New Orleans, Louisiana | 2015 |
| 45774 | St. Petersburg, Florida | 2015 |

== Media ==
RB-M 45771 at Station Destin, Florida was featured at Smarter Every Day channel

== See also ==
- Equipment of the United States Coast Guard
