= Protector (app) =

American personal security app

- Release: February 19, 2025
- Operating system: iOS
- Website: www.protector.so

Protector is a New York City-based personal security company that allows users to schedule protection details through an app, currently operating in Los Angeles and New York City. It has been described as "Uber with guns." In addition to the hourly cost of protection, which can include customization by dress code and number of security guards and hired cars, customers are required to pay a $129 yearly membership fee to use the service.
