= Canadian Coast Guard Academy =

Maritime training institution in Nova Scotia

Coordinates: 46°8′48.8″N 60°13′24.9″W

- Motto: Nil sin cura ("Attention to detail")
- Established: 1965
- Location: Westmount, Nova Scotia, Canada
- Campus: Urban
- Website: http://www.ccg-gcc.gc.ca/College

The Canadian Coast Guard Academy (CCG Academy), formally Canadian Coast Guard College, is a maritime training institution and Canadian Coast Guard facility located in Westmount, Nova Scotia—a suburb of the former city of Sydney in the Cape Breton Regional Municipality.

The CCG Academy core training program revolves around a 4-year Officer Cadet program that prepares navigation and engineering officers for service on Canadian Coast Guard ships. These cadets receive a Bachelor of Technology (Nautical Science) that is granted in collaboration with Cape Breton University. CCG Academy graduates work in the Canadian Coast Guard fleet as junior officers. Some graduates turn to land-based maritime offices as they advance in their careers.

Other training programs include a 6-month program for Marine Communications and Traffic Services Officers that specializes in radiotelephony procedures for marine safety and vessel traffic services to co-ordinate and monitor vessel movements in Canada's territorial waters. Canadian Coast Guard officers that work in the nation's Joint Rescue Coordination Centres (JRCCs) also undertake advanced training at CCG Academy where a mock-up of a JRCC exists for simulation and training purposes. Additionally, various courses and training programs exist for specialized positions in CCG, including administrative courses, search and rescue, and environmental response.

== History ==
Established in 1965 as a residential college on the site of the former navy base HMCS Protector located at Point Edward along the western shore of Sydney Harbour, CCG Academy's first mandate was to train young men in 4-year diplomas of Marine Engineering or Marine Navigation for the Coast Guard's Officer Training Program. The Officer Training Program expanded in 1973 to include women.

In 1981, CCG Academy moved from its location on the former Point Edward naval base to an adjacent custom-built 120 acre (486,000 m²) campus in neighbouring Westmount. The campus, designed by Nova Scotia Architect Keith L. Graham is located in a wooded area immediately south of Point Edward and adjacent to Petersfield Provincial Park. It consists of a variety of interlinked residential, training, administration, and health/fitness facilities. CCG Academy also has simulators for depicting the navigation of vessels in a variety of scenarios, dry-land mock-ups of vessel engine rooms, and a simulator for a rescue coordination centre (RCC).

CCG Academy has a small fleet of training vessels ranging from sail boats and rigid hull inflatable boats (RHIB) and one 47-foot (14 m) motor life boat - all housed in a custom-built boathouse on the Academy's waterfront along a small cove.

From the 1980s to the 2000s (decade), the academy expanded its training programs to include customized marine training for students from Commonwealth Caribbean nations, as well as other federal government agencies such as the Royal Canadian Mounted Police, Department of Fisheries and Oceans, and the Department of Transport.

In 1995, the 4 year Officer Training Program was granted degree accreditation through an agreement with the University College of Cape Breton, since renamed Cape Breton University. Following completion of the Officer Training program, graduates now receive a Bachelor of Technology (Nautical Science or nautical engineering) from CBU.

== Training programs ==
Following training programs are offered:

- Officer Training Program (OTP)
  - Marine Navigation
  - Marine Engineering
- Marine Communications and Traffic Services (MCTS) Officer Program
- Electronics and Informatics Technical Training (EITT)

== Admissions ==
Cadets are typically selected from Canadian high school graduates with a 70% average or higher including grade 12 physics, advanced math, and English (or French). Cadets applying for the engineering program must also have grade 11 chemistry. Once admitted, cadets hired into the Officer Training Program are indeterminate employees, civil servants of the Federal Government, receiving a monthly allowance of $800 (as of December 31, 2023) with an additional allowance while on sea phase of $1,551.81 to $2,205.85. The cost of tuition is paid by the Canadian government.

== Departments ==
- Marine Communications and Traffic Services
- Electronics and Informatics Technical Training
- Marine Engineering (Officer Training Program)
- Marine Navigation (Officer Training Program)
- Operational Training (Search and Rescue, Environmental Response)
- Sciences and Languages (Officer Training Program)
- Superintendent of Officer Cadets (Officer Training Program)

== Training vessels ==
There is one vessel assigned to the Acandemy:

- CCGS Spindrift

In 2011, CCGS CG 117 and CCGS CG 118 were retired as training vessels.

== See also ==
- Canadian Coast Guard
- Royal Military College of Canada
