= Protector (fireboat, British Columbia) =

Protector is a "Firestorm 30" fireboat in Victoria, British Columbia, purchased in 2007.

== Design and construction ==
The fireboat was built by Metalcraft Marine. Her crew of three can operate all her firefighting equipment from within her sealed cabin. She is equipped with a single cot where an injured individual can receive emergency medical care.

Her water cannons can project 2300 gallons. Twin diesels engines can propel her at 44 mph.

One of her two water cannon can be dismounted, which would be useful for fighting a fire, on land, if an earthquake, or terrorist attack, had knocked out the city's fire mains.

== Operational history ==
On July 29, 2013, the Protector's crew provided first aid to a woman and her rescuers, after passersby plucked her from Victoria's Gorge waterway.

Protector was employed to fight a fire on a burning barge on June 23, 2017. The barge was loaded with crushed cars being shipped to be recycling.
