= USS Protector =

USS Protector may refer to the following ships:

- USS Protector was a Continental Navy frigate captured by the British in May 1781.
- USS Protector (1798) was a full-rigged ship.
- USS Protector was the planned name for the monitor USS Dictator; name changed while the ship was still on the stocks
- USS Protector (ARS-14) was commissioned 28 December 1943; performed salvage and diving operations during much of her career; decommissioned on 15 May 1946
- USS Protector (YAGR-11) was laid down as the Liberty ship SS Warren P. Marks; commissioned as the Protector 20 February 1957; operated off the United States Eastern Seaboard until her decommissioning 28 July 1965
