= HMCS Protector =

Canadian naval base in Nova Scotia (1943–1965)

- Part of The Royal Canadian Navy
- Sydney Harbour
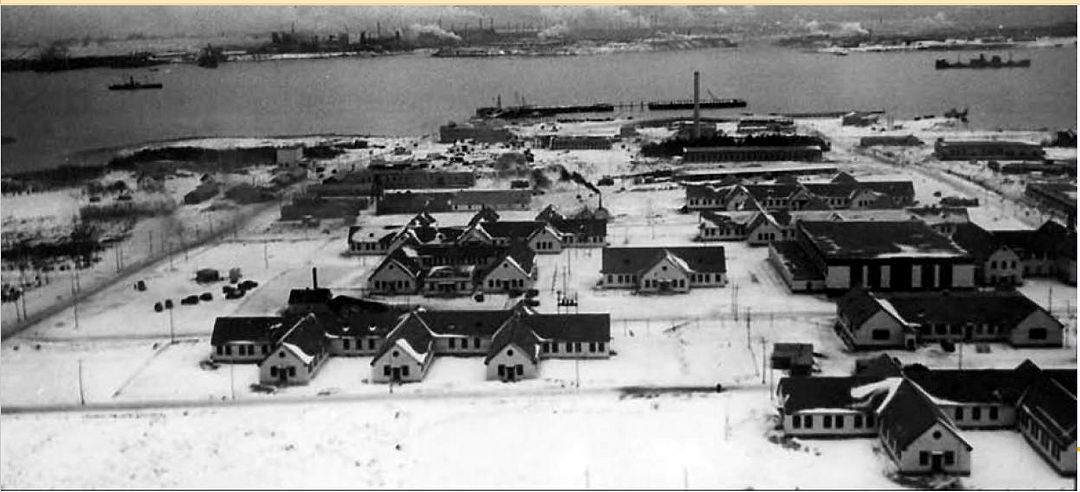
- A view, facing east, of HMCS Protector, and Sydney Harbour, and the Dominion Steel and Coal Company's Sydney Steel Plant in 1943. Merchant vessels can be seen in the harbour before departure on an Atlantic convoy.

Site information
- Type: Naval base
- Owner: Government of Canada
- Controlled by: Royal Canadian Navy

Location
- Coordinates: 46°9′18″N 60°13′14″W

Site history
- Built: 1943
- Built by: Dominion Construction Corporation Limited of Toronto
- In use: 1943—1964
- Demolished: 1982
- Battles/wars: Battle of the St. Lawrence, Battle of the Atlantic
- Events: Sinking of SS Caribou, Cold War

Royal Canadian Navy base HMCS Protector, also known as the Point Edward Naval Base, was located next to Sydney Harbour, on Nova Scotia's Cape Breton Island. It was founded in 1940 and used by the navy during the Second World War, mainly to provision, protect and repair merchant marine convoys to Quebec, Halifax, and the United Kingdom. It was a main combat zone during the Battle of the St. Lawrence and the more general Battle of the Atlantic. It continued to be used during the Cold War's early stages. In 1964, it was decommissioned and became the first facility to house the Canadian Coast Guard College. Today, the Sydport Industrial Park uses the base's former piers and land.

== Second World War 1939–1945 ==
In the months before the Second World War was declared in 1939, the RCMP Patrol Vessel Protector was stationed at Sydney for various policing duties. On 28 August 1939 the Royal Canadian Navy established a small shore facility on the Sydney waterfront. On 22 July 1940, this facility was commissioned as HMCS Protector, taking its name from Patrol Vessel Protector. At the time, navy regulations stated that a naval shore base's designation must use a seaborne ship's name.

HMCS Protector saw intensive use during the war, as Sydney Harbour became the assembly port for the SC (Slow Convoy) series Atlantic convoys, as well as convoys to other major ports in Canada: Halifax (SH) and Quebec (SQ). Other convoys that were marshaled by Protector were Sydney-Corner Brook (SB), Sydney-Port aux Basque (SPAB) and Sydney-Greenland (SG). It was the base for the warships that escorted the SC convoys in the western Atlantic. Protector was the focal point for the extensive Sydney Harbour defences against German U-boat attack.

HMCS Protector was initially stationed on the Sydney waterfront and used commercial wharves and buildings along Esplanade Street, where the present armouries and marine terminal are located. On 15 March 1943, a new custom-built shore facility and extensive piers was opened at Point Edward on the opposite western shore of the harbour, and was named HMCS Protector II, while the original was then renamed HMCS Protector I. A Canadian National Railways line linked this new base to the mainline to Point Tupper. Numerous convoy supply ships and warships were loaded and serviced at Protector by ship chandlers such as Sydney Ship Supply; at the same time, the navy maintained use of the commercial facilities on the eastern shore in Sydney proper. The base specialised in repair and fitting.

== Post-war era: 1945 to the present ==
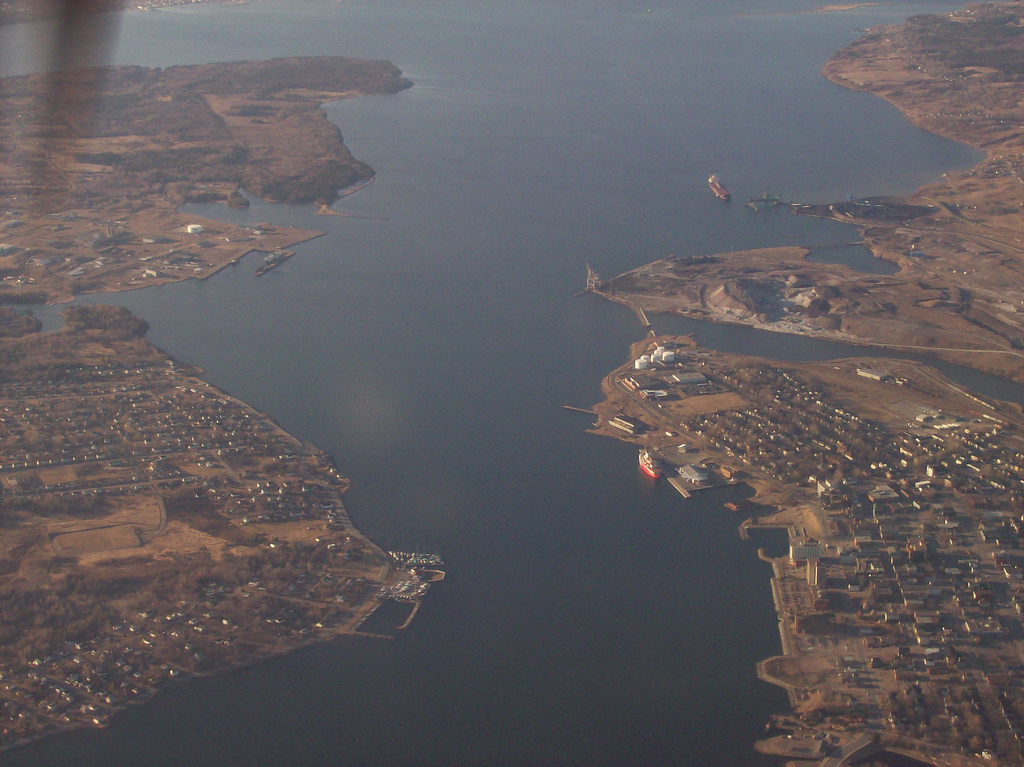
2008 aerial view of Sydney Harbour shows the location of the former HMCS Protector. HMCS Protector I was on the right where the red vessel is docked at the wharves. HMCS Projector II was at upper left where today's Point Edward Sydport piers are visible.

After the war's end, the navy stopped using the commercial facilities on the Sydney waterfront (eastern side of the harbour). It continued to use HMCS Protector at Point Edward, on the western side of the harbour. During the 1950s, the base was renovated and it became Sydney's second largest employer, after the Dominion Steel and Coal Company's steel plant, with about 650 personnel stationed there. The Progressive Conservative Diefenbaker government tried to close it in 1958, but it was deemed useful by NATO allies during the early stages of the Cold War. It was finally decommissioned in 1964. In 1965, following the base's closure, the Canadian Coast Guard College was located in some of the unused navy facilities, and used the base's jetties. The college continued to use these facilities throughout the 1970s and early 1980s, until a custom-built campus opened on an adjacent property in Edwardsville in 1981.

The former navy base is now used as an industrial park called Sydport.
