= Coastal Picket Force =

Former wartime component of the United States Coast Guard

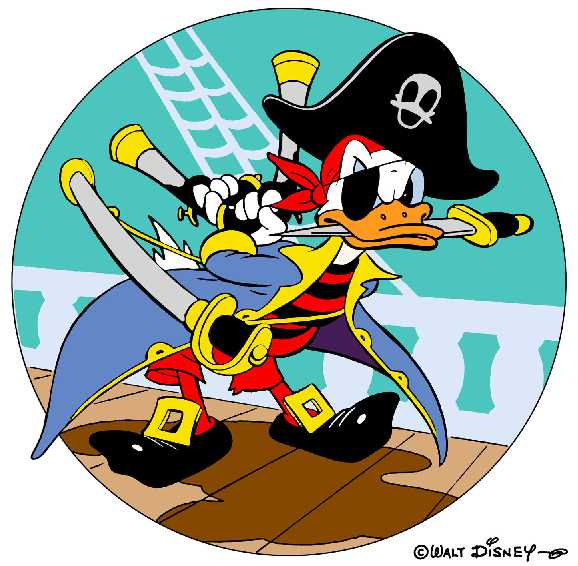
- The unofficial logo of the Coastal Picket Force by Walt Disney
- Active: 1942–1945
- Country: United States of America
- Branch: United States Coast Guard
- Role: Maritime safety and security, naval search and rescue, anti-submarine warfare
- Size: 2,000+ converted motor and sail craft
- Part of: United States Coast Guard
- Nickname: Hooligan's Navy
- Engagements: World War II: Battle of the Atlantic

The Coastal Picket Force (CPF), also called the Corsair Fleet or the Hooligan's Navy, was a short-lived civilian auxiliary component of the United States Coast Guard Reserve during World War II. The force was made up of temporary civilian volunteers who operated private yachts, fishing vessels, motorboats, and corsairs off the coastal waters of the United States and Canada in order to serve as naval picket boats, conduct anti-submarine warfare against U-boats, and provide search and rescue services for sunken ships. The CPF was most prominent along the East Coast of the United States, primarily during the Battle of the Atlantic.

== History ==
The Coastal Picket Force had its origins in the Neutrality Patrol, a pre-war escort service provided by the United States Navy in order to ensure the protection of British and French ships traveling along the North and South American coastlines. One of the premises for the creation of the Coastal Picket Force was the mass devastation of American and European ships following the First Happy Time (German: Die glückliche Zeit). By July 1941 there was a dire need for patrol boats, at the time the Coast Guard had only acquisitioned roughly 280 vessels to use as picket boats. In 1941 alone, six German U-Boats managed to sink a total of 41 ships on the East Coast and in the Straits of Florida utilizing Wolfpack tactics. By 1942 following America's entry into World War II the sinking of both merchant and military vessels increased. 233 merchant ships of the oil tanker fleet were sunk which harmed not only American ships as well as the economy, but also threatened America's ally, Great Britain, which was under a U-Boat blockade. In March 1942 alone, some 70 ships were sunk by German U-Boats. One of the ships sunk during this time was the SS Cyclops, a British cargo steamship which was torpedoed and sunk by German submarine U-123 on January 11, 1942 just 125 nautical miles off the coast of Cape Sable Island near Nova Scotia. The sinking of the SS Cyclops marked the first attack of the Kriegsmarine's so-called "Second Happy Time" codenamed Operation Drumbeat (German: Unternehmen Paukenschlag).

Alfred Stanford spearheaded the idea of a Coastal Picket Force on February 23, 1942, at the time Stanford was the Commodore of the Cruising Club of America. Stanford's original concept was to create an experimental fleet of 70 civilian sailboats which could be converted into an anti-submarine warfare patrols under the command of Vincent Astor. Stanford's thought behind this primarily stemmed from the fact that sailboats had no motor and were thus, at least in theory, less detectable by U-Boat hydrophones. Stanford quickly offered the ships of his club to Admiral Ernest J. King, at the time King was the Chief of Naval Operations. King was initially hesitant to accept Stanford's offer, but eventually after numerous letters and public outcry accepted Stanford's yachtsmen to be used as a component of the United States Coast Guard Reserve and the United States Coast Guard Auxiliary.

== Organization ==
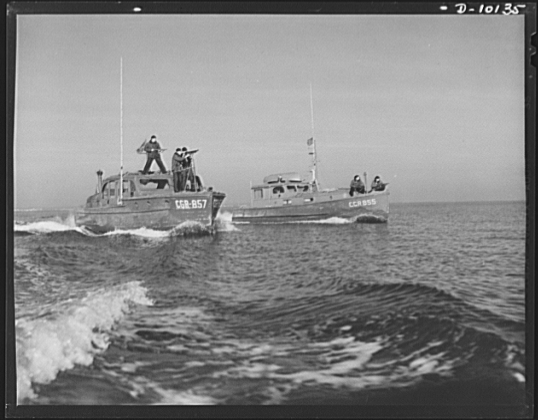
Two converted civilian boats of the Coastal Picket Force patrol the waters in February 1943

The Coastal Picket Force was formally created on May 15, 1942. The CPF was divided into six major districts from the North Atlantic coast to the Florida keys and the Gulf of Mexico. Many of the ships that initially served in the CPF were 36-foot picket boats which were holdovers from the United States Revenue Cutter Service which were later utilized by the United States Coast Guard during prohibition in the United States to cull seaborne Rum-running. Other boats in the initial fleet included the 83-foot patrol boat which were retrofitted for anti-submarine warfare and coastal search and rescue.

According to Captain Robert "Bob" Desh of the Foundation for Coast Guard History, civilian ships were also acquired by the Coast Guard Reserve through several means. Desh notes that "procurement included voluntary induction into the Reserve, gift or purchase for nominal consideration, requisition by charter, and requisition by purchase". By the summer of 1942 roughly 500 boats had been acquisitioned by the Coast Guard. In total some 2,000+ ships ended up serving in the CPF from 1942 to 1945. Ships acquisitioned by the Coast Guard were painted haze gray, stripped of any nonessential items, outfitted with light weaponry, and given a Coast Guard hull number.

Recruits for the CPF were originally pulled from the Coast Guard Temporary Reserve, an auxiliary component of the Coast Guard which was first established with the passing of the Coast Guard Reserve Act of June 23, 1939. The standard crew of a CPF boat included one Captain who held the temporary rank of Chief Boatswain's Mate while the second-in-command of the ship, typically an experienced sailor, held the rank of Boatswain's Mate First Class, the rest of the crew was made up of several Seaman. According to Coast Guard historian William H. Thiesen there were little requirements for people to join the CPF, "almost anyone who could reef a sail and steer a course, and many who could not, could qualify as a crewman". Each ship of the CPF was armed at the bare minimum with one .50 caliber machine gun, such as the M2 Browning, and outfitted with four depth charges and a radio. The average crew of a CPF vessel was between six to nine total personnel, the size of the boat dictating the size of the crew. Personnel in the CPF were considered "temporary reservists" but were paid the same as full-time Coast Guard personnel.

== Wartime use ==
By the Autumn of 1942 the CPF was made up of roughly 500 active vessels patrolling the Atlantic coastline and the Gulf of Mexico. Additionally, some 200 vessels served along the West Coast of the United States, although not all patrolled with the CPF. Patrols along the Pacific coast were primarily conducted around the Pacific Northwest and headquartered at Vancouver, Washington. The CPF played a variety of roles during its tenure as an auxiliary force under the Coast Guard. The majority of the CPF was responsible for naval search and rescue, the recovery of sunken materials, anti-submarine warfare, and patrolling a 15 nautical mile patrol grid at the 50-fathom line.

One notable example of vessels of the CPF sinking a German U-Boat occurred on September 12, 1942, when coastal picket CGR-4432 and a patrol aircraft spotted a U-Boat in the fourth district near southern New Jersey. CGR-4432 assisted by a Navy ship and military patrol blimp were able to drop depth charges on the U-Boats’ position which eventually neutralized the target. As previously stated, the CPF was vital in rescuing maritime personnel, a famous example of this was when the American Steam tanker R.M. Parker Jr. was torpedoed and sunk by German submarine U-171 off the coast of Louisiana on August 13, 1942. The crew of the R.M. Parker Jr. were rescued by a fishing Yawl, the Pioneer (renamed CGR-T-2267). Likewise when the American steam tanker Benjamin Brewster was torpedoed and sunk on July 10, 1942 by German submarine U-67 the crew was rescued by CPF personnel of CGR-355.

The CPF dwindled in the later years of the war, by 1943 the threat of submarines had been greatly diminished. especially following Black May when the Kriegsmarine suffered a significant loss of 43 U-Boats. The CPF was gradually decommissioned beginning in Autumn of 1943 and fully disbanded from the Coast Guard Reserve by the end of the war in 1945.

== Notable people ==
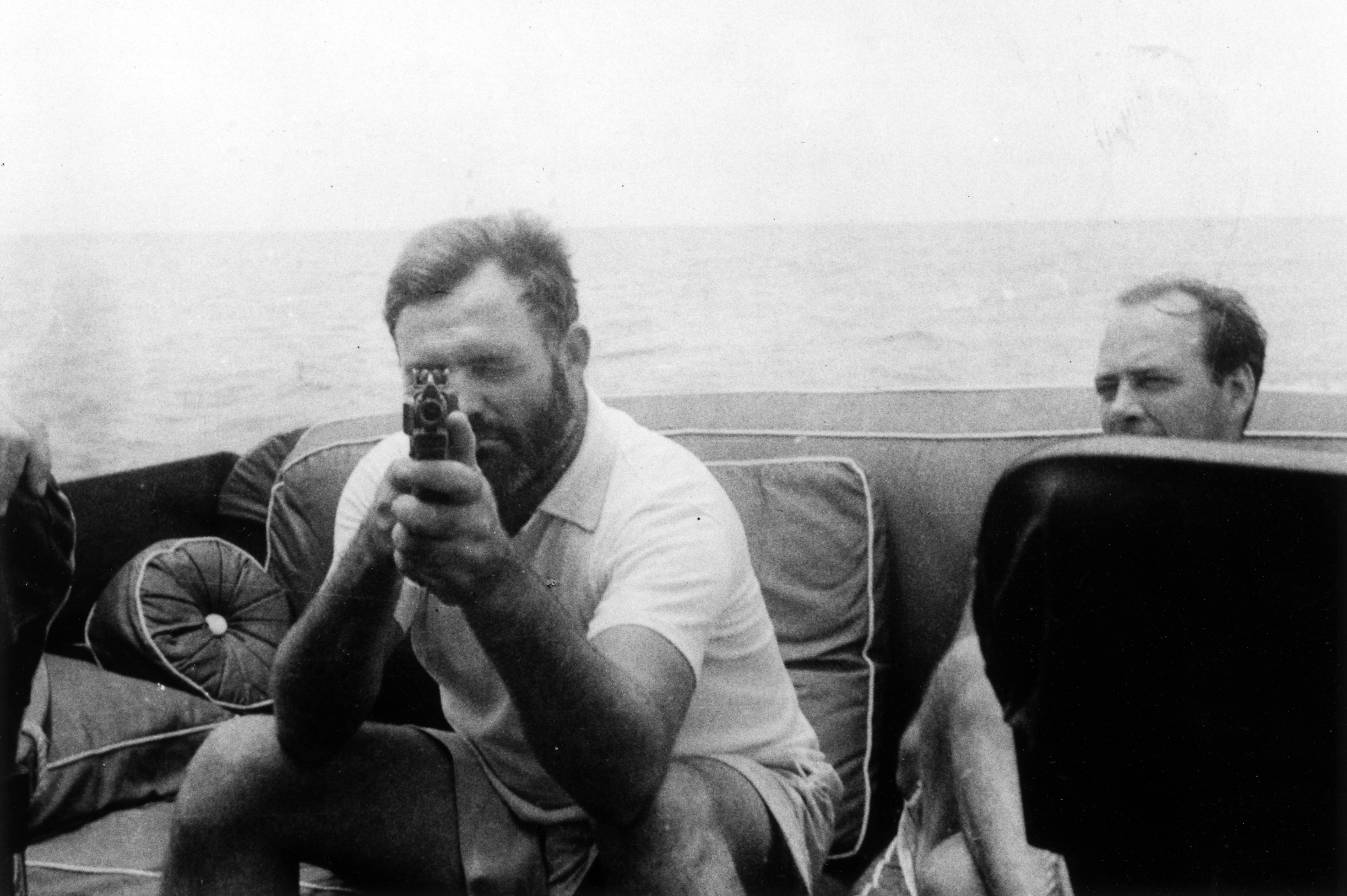
Ernest Hemingway, holding a Thompson submachine gun aboard his yacht, the Pilar

Several notable Americans served in the Coastal Picket Force in a variety of roles, these people include:

- Ernest Hemingway: Hemingway volunteered for the CPF aboard his yacht the Pilar which patrolled the Straits of Florida.
- Humphrey Bogart: Bogart had previously served in the United States Navy during World War I. During World War II Bogart attempted to re-enlist in the Navy but was denied due to his age. Bogart would ultimately serve in the CPF aboard his personal ship the Santana.
- Lawrance Thompson: Thompson served in the CPF aboard the vessel Zaida (later renamed CGR- 3070), a two-masted Yawl. Thompson’s ship was later involved in an elaborate search and rescue mission as the Zaida was blown off far off course. According to the United States Naval Institute the search for CGR- 3070 was one of the largest rescue missions during the course of the Battle of the Atlantic.
