= Humphrey Bogart =

American actor (1899–1957)

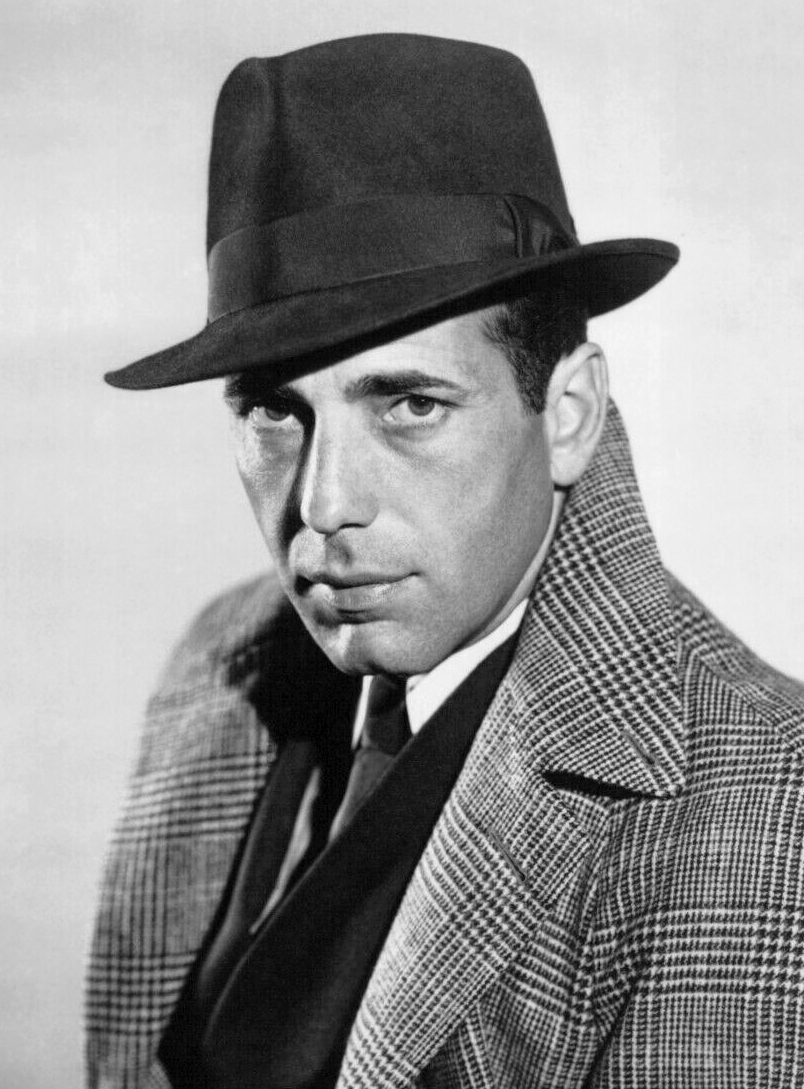
- Bogart in 1937
- Born: Humphrey DeForest Bogart; December 25, 1899; New York City, U.S.
- Died: January 14, 1957 (aged 57); Los Angeles, California, U.S.
- Resting place: Forest Lawn Memorial Park, Glendale, California
- Occupation: Actor
- Years active: 1921–1956
- Spouses: Helen Menken (m. 1926; div. 1927) Mary Philips (m. 1928; div. 1937) Mayo Methot (m. 1938; div. 1945) Lauren Bacall (m. 1945)
- Children: 2, including Stephen Humphrey
- Mother: Maud Humphrey
- Military career
- Allegiance: United States
- Branch: U.S. Navy; U.S. Coast Guard (CPF)
- Service years: 1918–1919, 1944
- Rank: Petty Officer Second Class

Humphrey DeForest Bogart (/ˈboʊɡɑːrt/ BOH-gart; December 25, 1899 – January 14, 1957), nicknamed Bogie, was an American actor. Often known for his leading roles as both gangsters and detectives in film noirs, his performances in classic Hollywood cinema made him an American cultural icon. He won an Academy Award and was honored with a star on the Hollywood Walk of Fame in 1960.

Bogart started his career on stage, and made his Broadway debut in 1922. He acted in 16 plays where he often took in supporting roles, regularly portraying gangsters, and was praised for his work in the play The Petrified Forest (1934). He made his feature film debut the pre-code film A Devil with Women (1930) and took early roles in the dramas Dead End (1937), Angels with Dirty Faces (1938) and Dark Victory (1939). He rose to stardom in 1941, by taking leading roles in two film noirs, playing a career criminal in High Sierra and Sam Spade in The Maltese Falcon.

He went on to win the Academy Award for Best Actor for his portrayal of a rough steamboat captain in the adventure film The African Queen (1951). He was Oscar-nominated for playing nightclub owner Rick Blaine in the romantic drama Casablanca (1942) and as an unstable captain in the military drama The Caine Mutiny (1954). Bogart further established himself as a leading man in films such as The Treasure of the Sierra Madre (1948), In a Lonely Place (1950), Sabrina, and The Barefoot Contessa (both 1954). He also acted opposite Lauren Bacall in To Have and Have Not (1944), The Big Sleep (1946), Dark Passage (1947) and Key Largo (1948). His final film role was in the boxing drama The Harder They Fall (1956).

Bogart married four times including to actress Bacall from 1945 until his death. A heavy smoker and drinker, Bogart died from esophageal cancer in January 1957. Bogart was also known for his roles on the radio and television. He kept a private life and spoke out rarely except as an opponent of actions of the House Un-American Activities Committee during the 1950s. The American Film Institute selected him as the greatest male star of classic American cinema in 1999. Four of his films were named in the AFI's Top 100 films of all time. (Note: The films were Casablanca, The Maltese Falcon, The Treasure of the Sierra Madre and The African Queen with Casablanca ranked second.)

== Early life ==
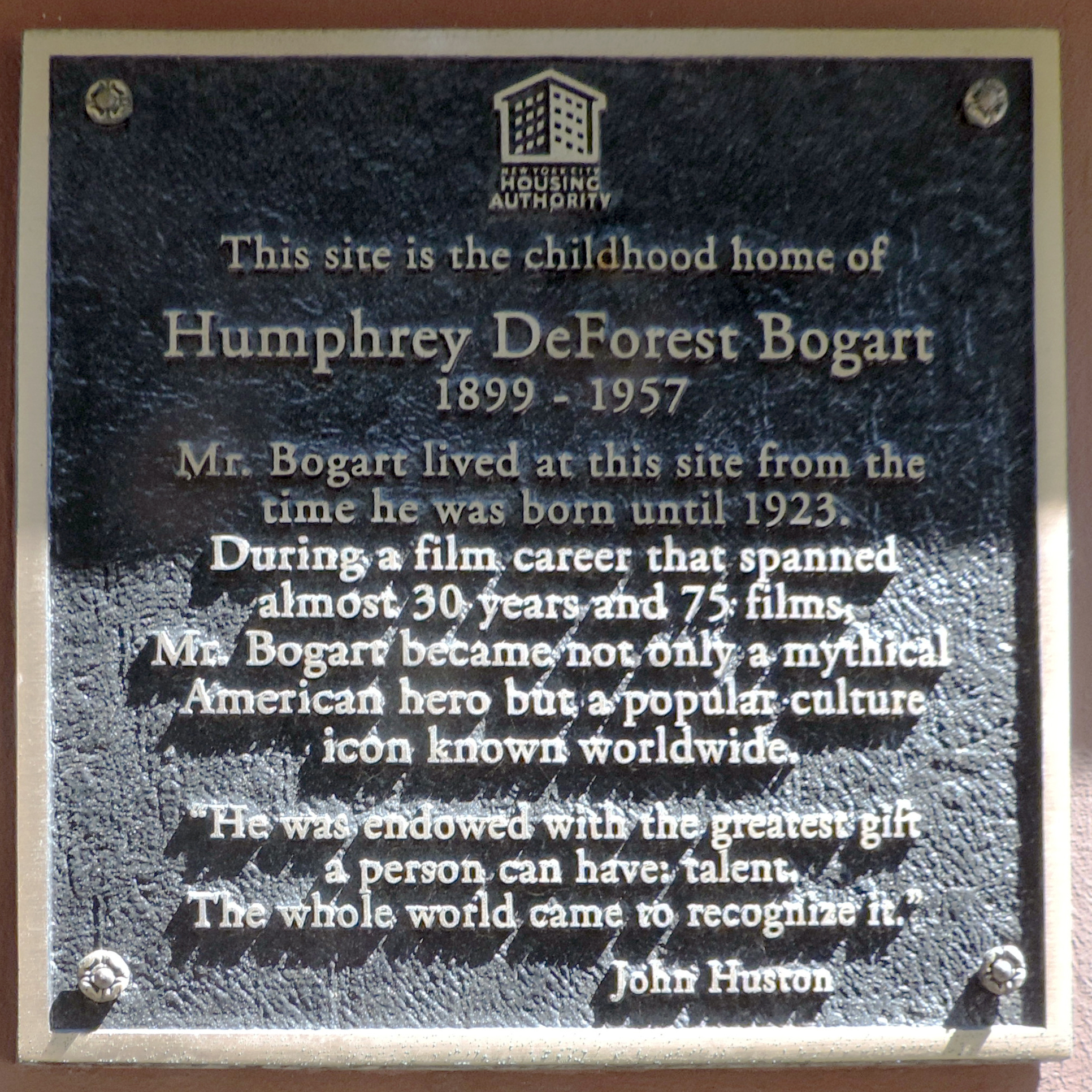
Plaque commemorating Bogart's birthplace, 245 W. 103rd St., New York City

Humphrey DeForest Bogart was born on Christmas Day 1899 in Washington Heights, Manhattan, New York City, the eldest child of Belmont DeForest Bogart and Maud Humphrey. Belmont was the only child of the unhappy marriage of Adam Welty Bogart (a Canandaigua, New York, innkeeper) and Julia Augusta Stiles, a wealthy heiress. The name "Bogart" derives from the Dutch surname "Bogaert", meaning "orchard". Belmont and Maud married in June 1898. He was a Presbyterian, of English and Dutch descent, and a descendant of Sarah Rapelje (the first European Christian girl born in New Netherland). Maud was an Episcopalian of English heritage and a descendant of Mayflower passenger John Howland. Humphrey was raised Episcopalian but was non-practicing for most of his adult life.

The date of Bogart's birth has been disputed. Clifford McCarty wrote that Warner Bros.' publicity department had altered it to January 23, 1900, "to foster the view that a man born on Christmas Day couldn't be as villainous as he appeared to be on screen". The "corrected" January birth date subsequently appeared—and in some cases, remains—in many otherwise-authoritative sources. According to biographers Ann M. Sperber and Eric Lax, Bogart always celebrated his birthday on December 25 and listed it on official records (including his marriage license).

Lauren Bacall wrote in her autobiography that Bogart's birthday was always celebrated on Christmas Day, saying that he joked about being cheated out of a present every year. Sperber and Lax noted that a birth announcement in the Ontario County Times of January 10, 1900, rules out the possibility of a January 23 birth date; state and federal census records from 1900 also report a Christmas 1899 birth date. Bogart's birth record confirms he was actually born on December 25, 1899.

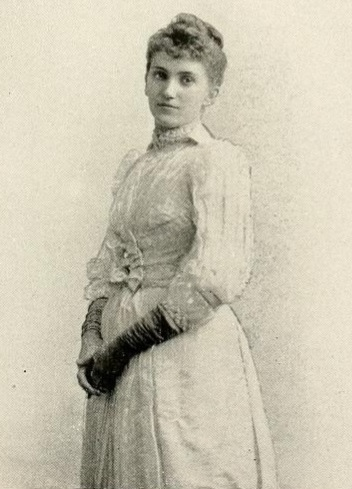
Maud Humphrey in the 1897 book American Women

Belmont, Bogart's father, was a cardiopulmonary surgeon. Maud was a commercial illustrator who received her art training in New York and France, including study with James Abbott McNeill Whistler. She later became art director of the fashion magazine The Delineator and a militant suffragette. Maud used a drawing of baby Humphrey in an advertising campaign for Mellins Baby Food. She earned over $50,000 a year at the peak of her career – a very large sum of money at the time, and considerably more than her husband's $20,000. The Bogarts lived in an Upper West Side apartment and had a cottage on a 55-acre estate on Canandaigua Lake in upstate New York. When he was young, Bogart's group of friends at the lake would put on plays.

He had two younger sisters: Frances ("Pat") and Catherine Elizabeth ("Kay"). Bogart's parents were busy in their careers and frequently fought. Very formal, they showed little emotion towards their children. Maud told her offspring to call her "Maud" rather than "Mother" and showed little, if any, physical affection for them. When she was pleased, she "[c]lapped you on the shoulder, almost the way a man does", Bogart recalled. "I was brought up very unsentimentally but very straightforwardly. A kiss, in our family, was an event. Our mother and father didn't glug over my two sisters and me."

Bogart was teased as a boy for his curls, tidiness, the "cute" pictures his mother had him pose for, the Little Lord Fauntleroy clothes in which she dressed him, and for his first name. He inherited from his father a tendency to needle, a fondness for fishing, a lifelong love of boating, and an attraction to strong-willed women.

Bogart attended the private Delancey School until the fifth grade and then attended the prestigious Trinity School. He was an indifferent, sullen student who showed no interest in after-school activities. Bogart later attended Phillips Academy in Andover, Massachusetts, a boarding school to which he was admitted based on family connections. Although his parents hoped that he would go on to Yale University, Bogart left Phillips in 1918 after one semester (although the Phillips Academy website claims he was in the graduating class of 1920). He failed four out of six classes. Several reasons have been given; according to one, he was expelled for throwing the headmaster (or a groundskeeper) into Rabbit Pond on campus. Other cited issues were smoking, drinking, poor academic performance, and (possibly) inappropriate comments made to the staff. In a third scenario, Bogart was withdrawn by his father for failing to improve his grades. His parents were deeply disappointed in their failed plans for his future.

== Navy ==
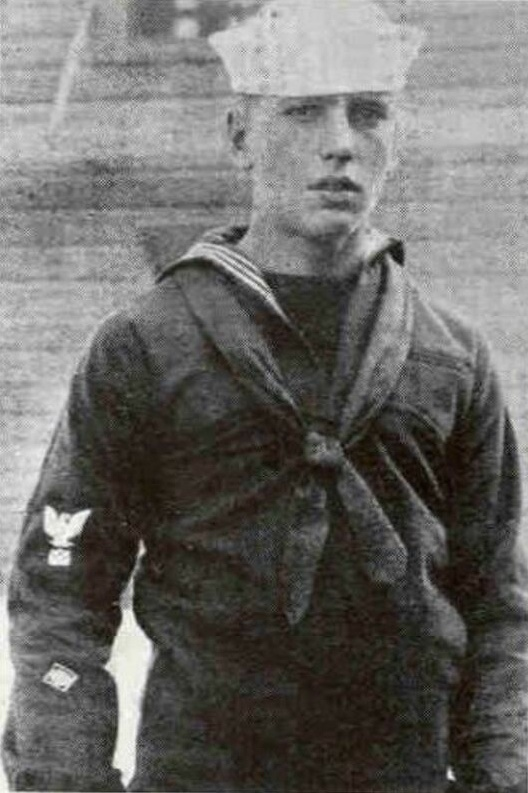
Enlisting at 18 in the U.S. Navy in 1918, Bogart was recorded as a model sailor.

With no viable career options, Bogart enlisted in the United States Navy in the spring of 1918, during World War I. He recalled later, "At 18, war was great stuff. Paris! Sexy French girls! Hot damn!" Bogart was recorded as a model sailor, who spent most of his sea time after the armistice ferrying troops back from Europe. Bogart left the service on June 18, 1919, at the rank of Petty Officer 2nd Class. During World War II, Bogart attempted to re-enlist in the Navy but was rejected due to his age. He then volunteered for the Coastal Picket Force in 1944, patrolling the California coastline in his yacht, the Santana.

He may have received his trademark scar and developed his characteristic lisp during his naval stint. There are several conflicting stories. In one, his lip was cut by shrapnel when his ship (the USS Leviathan) was shelled. The ship was never shelled, however, and Bogart may not have been at sea before the armistice. Another story, held by longtime friend Nathaniel Benchley, was that Bogart was injured while taking a prisoner to Portsmouth Naval Prison in Kittery, Maine. While changing trains in Boston, the handcuffed prisoner reportedly asked Bogart for a cigarette. When Bogart looked for a match, the prisoner smashed him across the mouth with the cuffs (cutting Bogart's lip) and fled before being recaptured and imprisoned. In an alternative version, Bogart was struck in the mouth by a handcuff loosened while freeing his charge; the other handcuff was still around the prisoner's wrist. By the time Bogart was treated by a doctor, a scar had formed. David Niven said that when he first asked Bogart about his scar, however, he said that it was caused by a childhood accident. "Goddamn doctor", Bogart later told Niven. "Instead of stitching it up, he screwed it up." According to Niven, the stories that Bogart got the scar during wartime were made up by the studios. His post-service physical did not mention the lip scar, although it noted many smaller scars. When actress Louise Brooks met Bogart in 1924, he had scar tissue on his upper lip, which Brooks said Bogart may have had partially repaired before entering the film industry in 1930. Brooks said that his "lip wound gave him no speech impediment, either before or after it was mended."

== Acting ==
=== First performances ===
Bogart returned home to find his father in poor health, his medical practice faltering, and much of the family's wealth lost in bad timber investments. His character and values developed separately from his family during his navy days, and he began to rebel. Bogart became a liberal who disliked pretension, phonies, and snobs, sometimes defying conventional behavior and authority; he was also well-mannered, articulate, punctual, self-effacing, and standoffish. After his naval service, he worked as a shipper and a bond salesman, joining the Coast Guard Reserve.

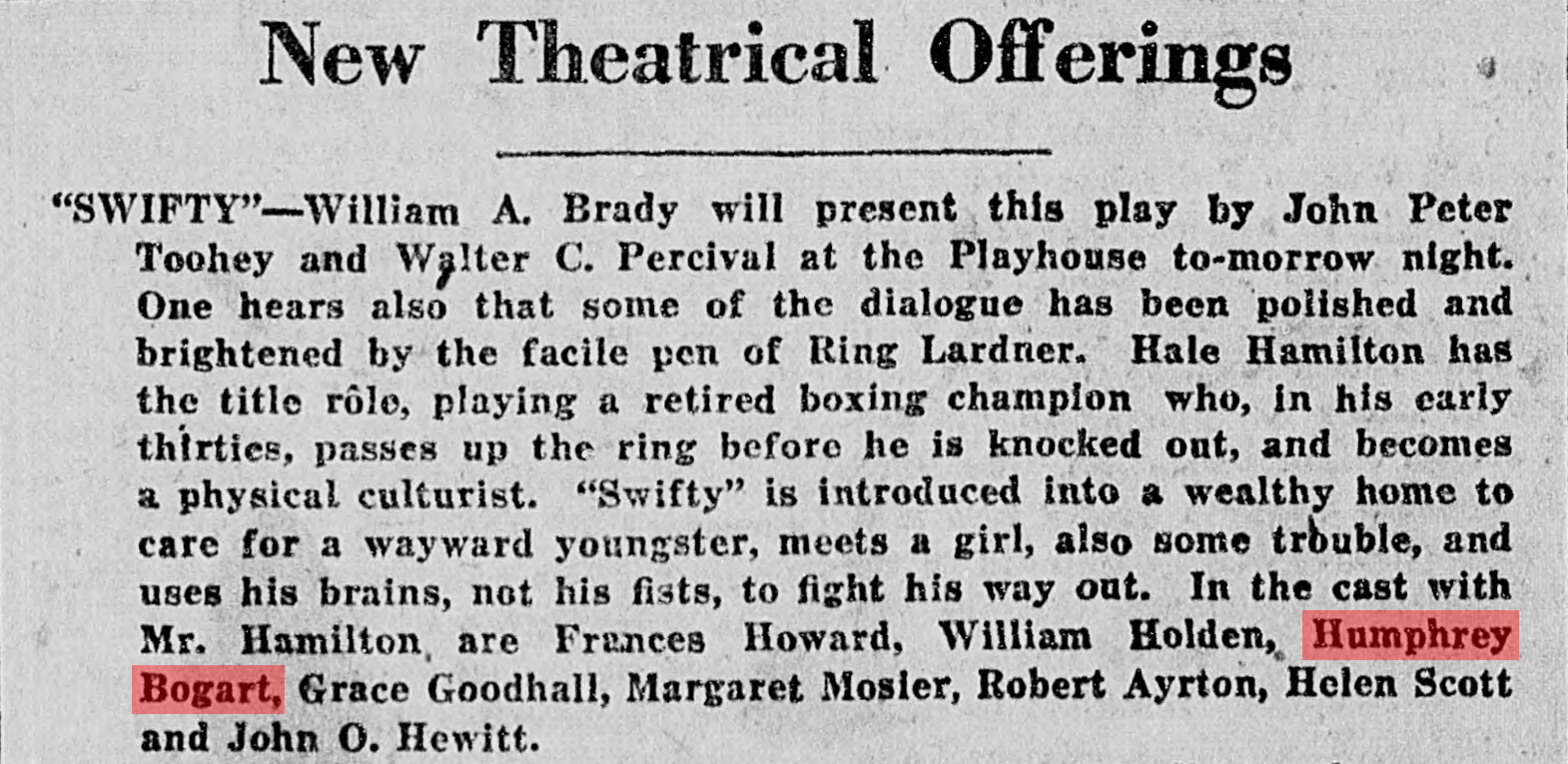
Bogart was praised in an October 15, 1922, newspaper review of the play Swifty: "Humphrey Bogart as the erring young man, Tom Proctor, did an excellent bit of work in the main".

Frank Kelly Rich writes that Bogart "dove headfirst into the Jazz Age lifestyle, always up for late night revels... When his meager wages were exhausted, he'd play chess against all comers in arcades for a dollar a match (he was a brilliant player) to fund his outings." Mike Doyle of Chess.com writes that "Before he made any money from acting, he would hustle players for dimes and quarters, playing in New York parks and at Coney Island." Bogart resumed his friendship with Bill Brady Jr. (whose father had show-business connections), and obtained an office job with William A. Brady's new World Films company. Although he wanted to try his hand at screenwriting, directing, and production, he excelled at none. Bogart was stage manager for Brady's daughter Alice's play A Ruined Lady. He made his stage debut a few months later as a Japanese butler in Alice's 1921 play Drifting (nervously delivering one line of dialogue), and appeared in several of her subsequent plays.

Although Bogart had been raised to believe that acting was a lowly profession, he liked the late hours actors kept and the attention they received: "I was born to be indolent and this was the softest of rackets." He spent much of his free time in speakeasies, drinking heavily. A bar-room brawl at this time was also a purported cause of Bogart's lip damage, dovetailing with Louise Brooks's account.

Preferring to learn by doing, he never took acting lessons. Bogart was persistent and worked steadily at his craft, appearing in at least 18 Broadway productions between 1922 and 1935, 11 of which were comedies. He played juveniles or romantic supporting roles in drawing-room comedies and is reportedly the first actor to say, "Tennis, anyone?" on stage. According to Alexander Woollcott, Bogart "is what is usually and mercifully described as inadequate." Other critics were kinder. Heywood Broun, reviewing Nerves, wrote: "Humphrey Bogart gives the most effective performance ... both dry and fresh, if that be possible". He played a juvenile lead (reporter Gregory Brown) in Lynn Starling's comedy Meet the Wife, which had a successful 232-performance run at the Klaw Theatre from November 1923 through July 1924. Bogart disliked his trivial, effeminate early-career roles, calling them "White Pants Willie" roles.

While playing a double role in Drifting at the Playhouse Theatre in 1922, he met actress Helen Menken; they were married on May 20, 1926, at the Gramercy Park Hotel in New York City. Divorced on November 18, 1927, they remained friends. Menken said in her divorce filing that Bogart valued his career more than marriage, citing neglect and abuse. He married actress Mary Philips on April 3, 1928, at her mother's apartment in Hartford, Connecticut; Bogart and Philips had worked together in the play Nerves during its brief run at the Comedy Theatre in 1924.

Theatrical production dropped off sharply after the Wall Street Crash of 1929, and many of the more-photogenic actors headed for Hollywood. Bogart debuted on film with Helen Hayes in the 1928 two-reeler The Dancing Town, which survives intact. He also appeared with Joan Blondell and Ruth Etting in a Vitaphone short, Broadway's Like That (1930), which was rediscovered in 1963.

=== Broadway to Hollywood ===
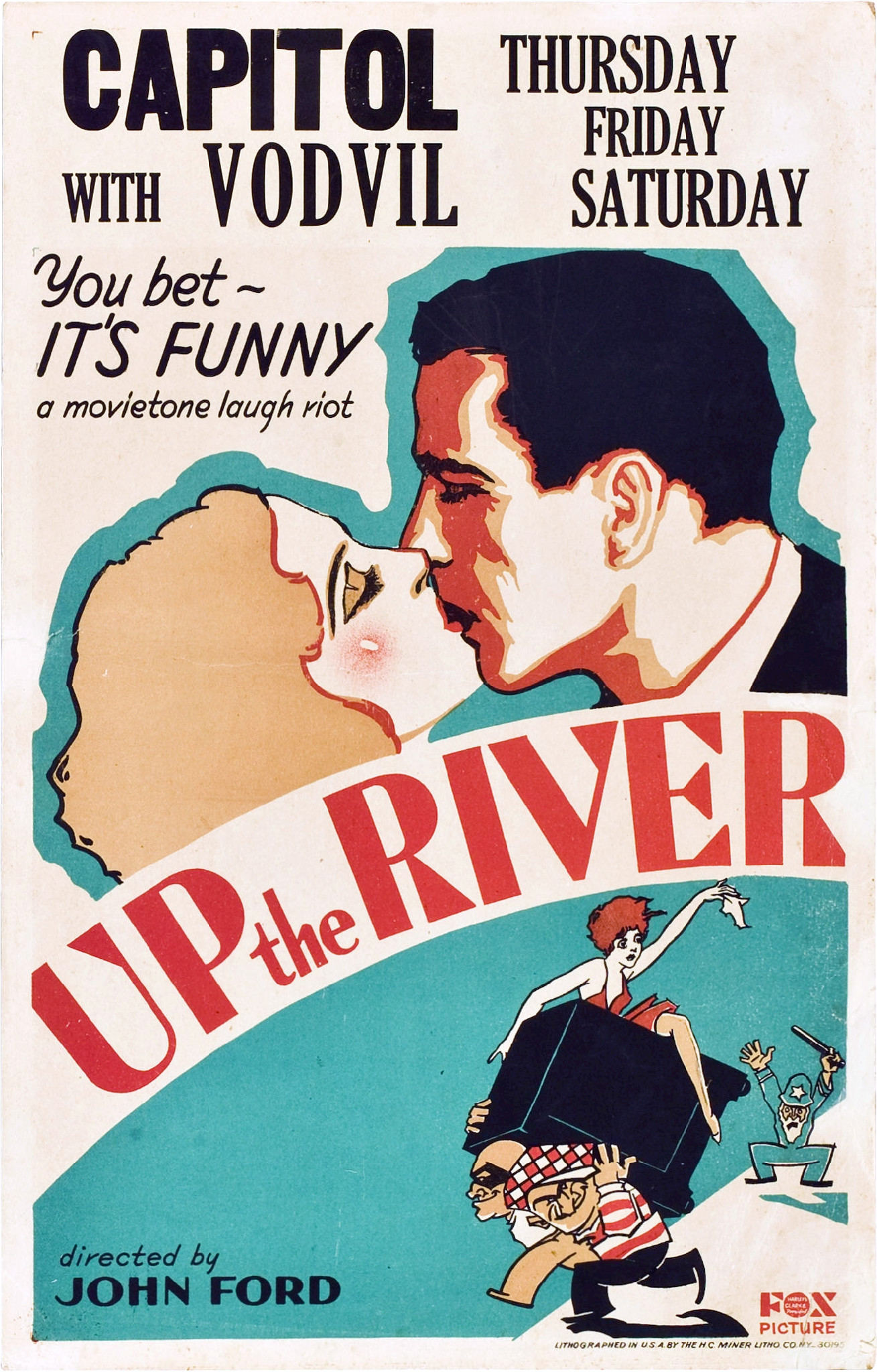
Claire Luce and Bogart in Up the River (1930)

Bogart signed a contract with the Fox Film Corporation for $750 a week (about $13,933 in 2025). There he met Spencer Tracy, a Broadway actor whom Bogart liked and admired, and the two men became close friends and drinking companions. In 1930, Tracy first called him "Bogie". Tracy made his feature film debut in his only movie with Bogart, John Ford's early sound film Up the River (1930), in which their leading roles were as prison inmates. Tracy received top billing, but Bogart's picture appeared on the film's posters. He was billed fourth behind Tracy, Claire Luce, and Warren Hymer, but his role was almost as large as Tracy's and much larger than Luce's or Hymer's. A quarter of a century later, the two men planned to make The Desperate Hours together. Both insisted upon top billing, however; Tracy dropped out, and was replaced by Fredric March.

Bogart then had a supporting role in Bad Sister (1931) with Bette Davis. Bogart shuttled back and forth between Hollywood and the New York stage from 1930 to 1935, out of work for long periods. His parents had separated; his father died in 1934 in debt, which Bogart eventually paid off. He inherited his father's gold ring, which he wore in many of his films. At his father's deathbed, Bogart finally told him how much he loved him. Bogart's second marriage was rocky; dissatisfied with his acting career, depressed and irritable, he drank heavily.

=== In Hollywood permanently: The Petrified Forest ===
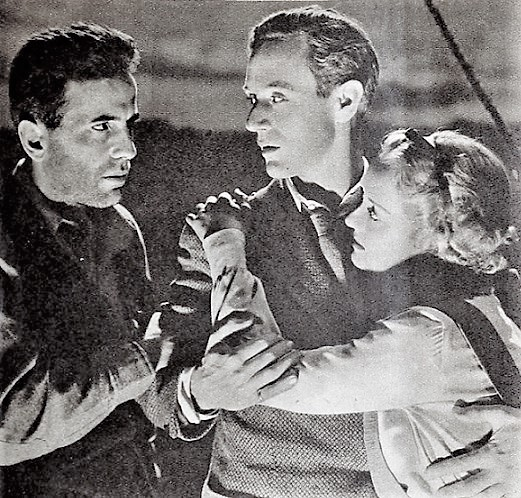
Bogart, Leslie Howard, and Bette Davis in The Petrified Forest, 1936

In 1934, Bogart starred in the Broadway play Invitation to a Murder at the Theatre Masque (renamed the John Golden Theatre in 1937). Its producer, Arthur Hopkins, heard the play from offstage; he sent for Bogart and offered him the role of escaped murderer Duke Mantee in Robert E. Sherwood's forthcoming play, The Petrified Forest. Hopkins later recalled:

When I saw the actor I was somewhat taken aback, for [I realized] he was the one I never much admired. He was an antiquated juvenile who spent most of his stage life in white pants swinging a tennis racquet. He seemed as far from a cold-blooded killer as one could get, but the voice[,] dry and tired[,] persisted, and the voice was Mantee's.

The play had 197 performances at the Broadhurst Theatre in New York in 1935. Although Leslie Howard was the star, The New York Times critic Brooks Atkinson said that the play was "a peach ... a roaring Western melodrama ... Humphrey Bogart does the best work of his career as an actor." Bogart said that the play "marked my deliverance from the ranks of the sleek, sybaritic, stiff-shirted, swallow-tailed 'smoothies' to which I seemed condemned to life." However, he still felt insecure. Warner Bros. bought the screen rights to The Petrified Forest in 1935. The play seemed ideal for the studio, which was known for its socially-realistic pictures for a public entranced by real-life criminals such as John Dillinger and Dutch Schultz. Bette Davis and Leslie Howard were cast. Howard, who held the production rights, made it clear that he wanted Bogart to star with him.

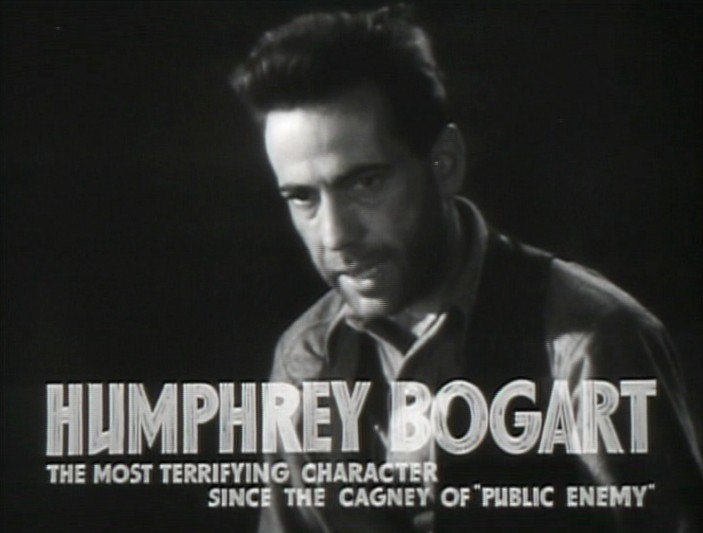
The Petrified Forest trailer (1936)

The studio tested several Hollywood veterans for the Duke Mantee role and chose Edward G. Robinson, who had star appeal and was due to make a film to fulfill his contract. Bogart cabled news of this development to Howard in Scotland, who replied: "Att: Jack Warner Insist Bogart Play Mantee No Bogart No Deal L.H.". When Warner Bros. saw that Howard would not budge, they gave in and cast Bogart. Jack Warner wanted Bogart to use a stage name but Bogart declined, having built a reputation with his name in Broadway theater. The film version of The Petrified Forest was released in 1936. According to Variety, "Bogart's menace leaves nothing wanting". Frank S. Nugent wrote for The New York Times that the actor "can be a psychopathic gangster more like Dillinger than the outlaw himself". The film was successful at the box office, earning $500,000 in rentals ($11,427,014 in 2025), and made Bogart a star. He never forgot Howard's favor and named his only daughter, Leslie Howard Bogart, after him in 1952.

=== Supporting gangster and villain roles ===
Despite his success in The Petrified Forest (an "A movie"), Bogart signed a tepid 26-week contract at $550 ($12,570 in 2025) per week and was typecast as a gangster in a series of B movie crime dramas. Although he was proud of his success, the fact that it derived from gangster roles weighed on him: "I can't get in a mild discussion without turning it into an argument. There must be something in my tone of voice, or this arrogant face—something that antagonizes everybody. Nobody likes me on sight. I suppose that's why I'm cast as the heavy."

In spite of his success, Warner Bros. had no interest in raising Bogart's profile. His roles were repetitive and physically demanding; studios were not yet air-conditioned, and his tightly scheduled job at Warners was anything but the indolent and "peachy" actor's life he hoped for. Although Bogart disliked the roles chosen for him, he worked steadily. "In the first 34 pictures" for Warners, he told journalist George Frazier, "I was shot in 12, electrocuted or hanged in 8, and was a jailbird in 9". He averaged a film every two months between 1936 and 1940, sometimes working on two films at the same time. Bogart used these years to begin developing his film persona: a wounded, stoical, cynical, charming, vulnerable, self-mocking loner with a code of honor.

Amenities at Warners were few, compared to the prestigious Metro-Goldwyn-Mayer. Bogart thought that the Warners wardrobe department was cheap, and often wore his own suits in his films. He chose his own dog, named Zero, to play Pard (his character's dog) in High Sierra. His disputes with Warner Bros. over roles and money were similar to those waged by the studio with more established and less malleable stars such as Bette Davis and James Cagney.

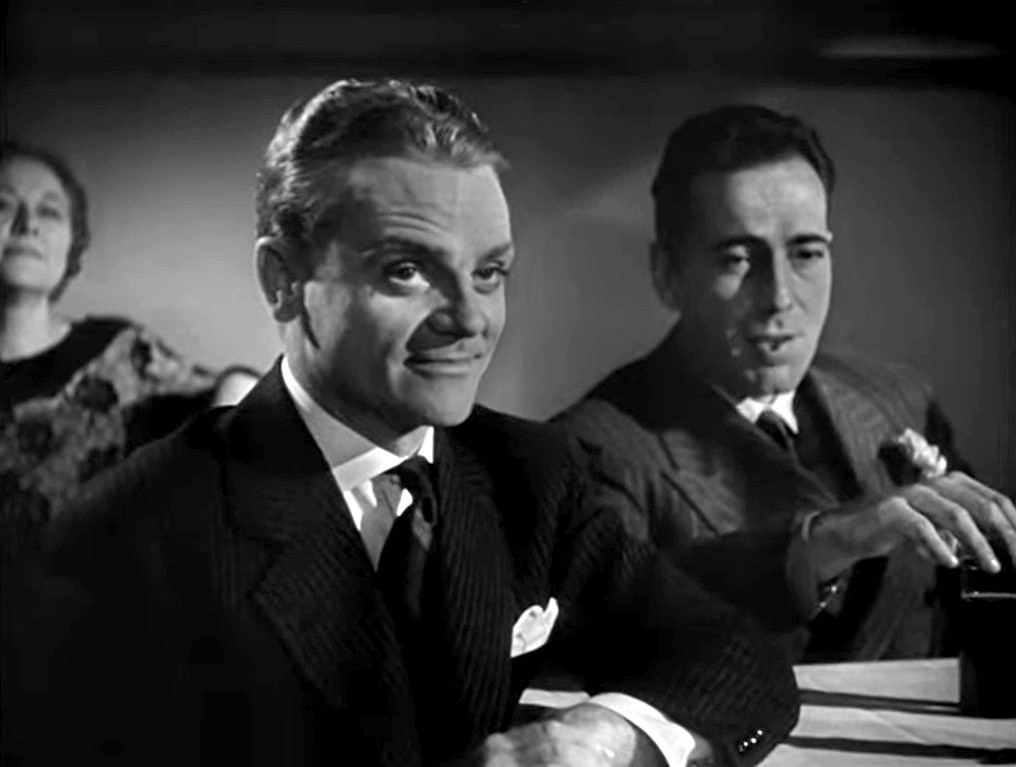
Taking a back seat to James Cagney in The Roaring Twenties (1939), the last film they made together

Leading men at Warner Bros. included George Raft, James Cagney and Edward G. Robinson. Most of the studio's better scripts went to them or others, leaving Bogart with what was left: films such as San Quentin (1937), Racket Busters (1938), and You Can't Get Away with Murder (1939). His only leading role during this period was in Dead End (1937, on loan to Samuel Goldwyn), as a gangster modeled after Baby Face Nelson.

Bogart played violent roles so often that in Nevil Shute's 1939 novel, What Happened to the Corbetts, the protagonist replies "I've seen Humphrey Bogart with one often enough" when asked if he knows how to operate an automatic weapon. Although he played a variety of supporting roles in films such as Angels with Dirty Faces (1938), Bogart's roles were either rivals of characters played by Cagney and Robinson or a secondary member of their gang. In Black Legion (1937), a movie Graham Greene described as "intelligent and exciting, if rather earnest", he played a good man who was caught up with (and destroyed by) a racist organization.

The studio cast Bogart as a wrestling promoter in Swing Your Lady (1938), a "hillbilly musical" which he reportedly considered his worst film performance. He played a rejuvenated, formerly-dead scientist in The Return of Doctor X (1939), his only horror film: "If it'd been Jack Warner's blood ... I wouldn't have minded so much. The trouble was they were drinking mine and I was making this stinking movie." His wife, Mary, had a stage hit in A Touch of Brimstone and refused to abandon her Broadway career for Hollywood. After the play closed, Mary relented; she insisted on continuing her career, however, and they divorced in 1937.

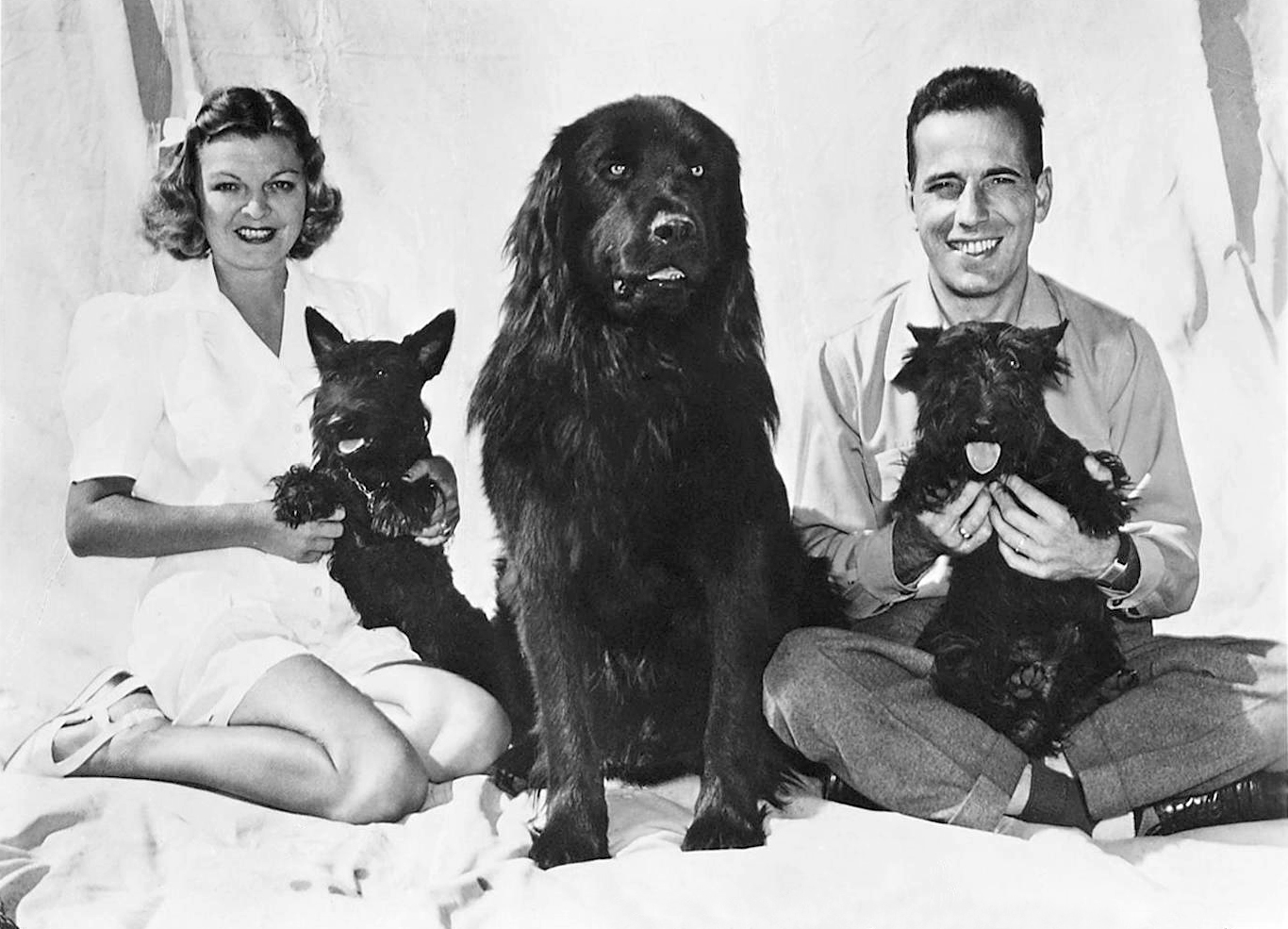
Mayo Methot and Bogart with their dogs (1944)

On August 21, 1938, Bogart entered a turbulent third marriage to actress Mayo Methot, a lively, friendly woman when sober but paranoid and aggressive when drunk. She became convinced that Bogart was unfaithful to her (which he eventually was, with Lauren Bacall, while filming To Have and Have Not in 1944). They drifted apart; Methot's drinking increased, and she threw plants, crockery and other objects at Bogart. She set their house afire, stabbed him with a knife, and slashed her wrists several times. Bogart needled her; apparently enjoying confrontation, he was sometimes violent as well. The press called them "the Battling Bogarts".

According to their friend, Julius Epstein, "The Bogart-Methot marriage was the sequel to the Civil War". Bogart bought a motor launch which he named Sluggy, his nickname for Methot: "I like a jealous wife .. We get on so well together (because) we don't have illusions about each other ... I wouldn't give you two cents for a dame without a temper." Louise Brooks said that "except for Leslie Howard, no one contributed as much to Humphrey's success as his third wife, Mayo Methot." Methot's influence was increasingly destructive, however, and Bogart also continued to drink.

He had a lifelong disdain for pretension and phoniness, and was again irritated by his inferior films. Bogart rarely watched his own films and avoided premieres, issuing fake press releases about his private life to satisfy journalistic and public curiosity. When he thought an actor, director or studio had done something shoddy, he spoke up publicly about it. Bogart advised Robert Mitchum that the only way to stay alive in Hollywood was to be an "againster". He was not the most popular of actors, and some in the Hollywood community shunned him privately to avoid trouble with the studios. Bogart once said,

All over Hollywood, they are continually advising me, "Oh, you mustn't say that. That will get you in a lot of trouble," when I remark that some picture or writer or director or producer is no good. I don't get it. If he isn't any good, why can't you say so? If more people would mention it, pretty soon it might start having some effect. The local idea that anyone making a thousand dollars a week is sacred and is beyond the realm of criticism never strikes me as particularly sound.

The Hollywood press, unaccustomed to such candor, was delighted.

=== Early stardom ===
==== High Sierra ====
High Sierra (1941, directed by Raoul Walsh) featured a screenplay written by John Huston, Bogart's friend and drinking partner, adapted from a novel by W. R. Burnett, author of the novel on which Little Caesar was based. Paul Muni, George Raft, Cagney and Robinson turned down the lead role, giving Bogart the opportunity to play a character with some depth. Walsh initially opposed Bogart's casting, preferring Raft for the part. It was Bogart's last major film as a gangster; a supporting role followed in The Big Shot, released in 1942. He worked well with Ida Lupino, sparking jealousy from Mayo Methot.

The film cemented a strong personal and professional connection between Bogart and Huston. Bogart admired (and somewhat envied) Huston for his skill as a writer; a poor student, Bogart was a lifelong reader. He could quote Plato, Alexander Pope, Ralph Waldo Emerson and over a thousand lines of Shakespeare, and subscribed to the Harvard Law Review. Bogart admired writers; some of his best friends were screenwriters, including Louis Bromfield, Nathaniel Benchley, and Nunnally Johnson. He enjoyed intense, provocative conversation (accompanied by stiff drinks), as did Huston. Both were rebellious and enjoyed playing childish pranks. Huston was reportedly easily bored during production and admired Bogart (also bored easily off-camera) for his acting talent and his intense concentration on-set.

==== The Maltese Falcon ====
Bogart in a publicity picture with the prop Maltese Falcon

Now regarded as a classic film noir, The Maltese Falcon (1941) was John Huston's directorial debut. Based on the Dashiell Hammett novel, it was first serialized in the pulp magazine Black Mask in 1929 and was the basis of two earlier film versions; the second was Satan Met a Lady (1936), starring Bette Davis. Producer Hal B. Wallis initially offered to cast George Raft as the leading man, but Raft (then better known than Bogart) had a contract stipulating he was not required to appear in remakes. Fearing that it would be nothing more than a sanitized version of the pre-Production Code The Maltese Falcon (1931), Raft turned down the role to make Manpower with director Raoul Walsh, with whom he had worked on The Bowery in 1933. Huston then eagerly accepted Bogart as his Sam Spade.

Complementing Bogart were co-stars Sydney Greenstreet, Peter Lorre, Elisha Cook Jr., and Mary Astor as the treacherous female foil. Bogart's sharp timing and facial expressions were praised by the cast and director as vital to the film's quick action and rapid-fire dialogue. It was a commercial hit, and a major triumph for Huston. Bogart was unusually happy with the film: "It is practically a masterpiece. I don't have many things I'm proud of ... but that's one".

==== Casablanca ====
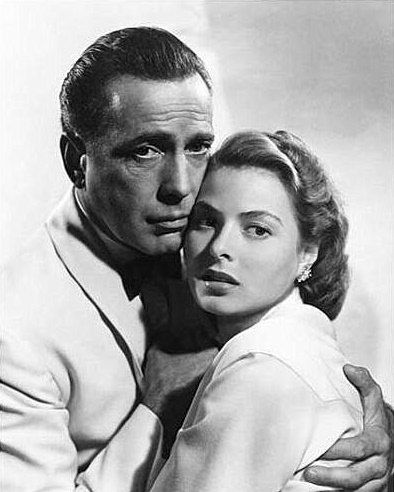
With Ingrid Bergman in Casablanca (1942), which earned Bogart the first of three Oscar nominations

Bogart played his first romantic lead in Casablanca (1942): Rick Blaine, an expatriate nightclub owner hiding from a suspicious past and negotiating a fine line among Nazis, the French underground, the Vichy prefect and unresolved feelings for his ex-girlfriend. Bosley Crowther wrote in his November 1942 New York Times review that Bogart's character was used "to inject a cold point of tough resistance to evil forces afoot in Europe today". The film, directed by Michael Curtiz and produced by Hal Wallis, featured Ingrid Bergman, Claude Rains, Sydney Greenstreet, Paul Henreid, Conrad Veidt, Peter Lorre and Dooley Wilson.

Bogart and Bergman's on-screen relationship was based on professionalism rather than actual rapport, although Mayo Methot assumed otherwise. Off the set, the co-stars hardly spoke. Bergman (who had a reputation for affairs with her leading men) later said about Bogart, "I kissed him but I never knew him." Because she was taller, Bogart had 3-inch (76 mm) blocks attached to his shoes in some scenes.

Bogart is reported to have been responsible for the notion that Rick Blaine should be portrayed as a chess player, a metaphor for the relationships he maintained with friends, enemies, and allies. He played tournament-level chess (one division below master) in real life, often enjoying games with crew members and cast but finding his better in Paul Henreid. During the production, Bogart also began playing games of correspondence chess against American G.I.s through mail. The series of long distance matches began after a private whom Bogart bested on set was transferred to the South Pacific. The letters began to be intercepted by the FBI due to fears the algebraic notation used in chess games was actually an encrypted message.

Casablanca won the Academy Award for Best Picture at the 16th Academy Awards for 1943. Bogart was nominated for Best Actor in a Leading Role, but lost to Paul Lukas for his performance in Watch on the Rhine. The film vaulted Bogart from fourth place to first in the studio's roster, however, finally overtaking James Cagney. He more than doubled his annual salary to over $460,000 by 1946 ($7,493,777 in 2025), making him the world's highest-paid actor.

Bogart went on United Service Organizations and War Bond tours with Methot in 1943 and 1944, making arduous trips to Italy and North Africa (including Casablanca). He was still required to perform in films with weak scripts, leading to conflicts with the front office. He starred in Conflict (1945, again with Greenstreet), but turned down God Is My Co-Pilot that year.

=== Bogie and Bacall ===
==== To Have and Have Not ====
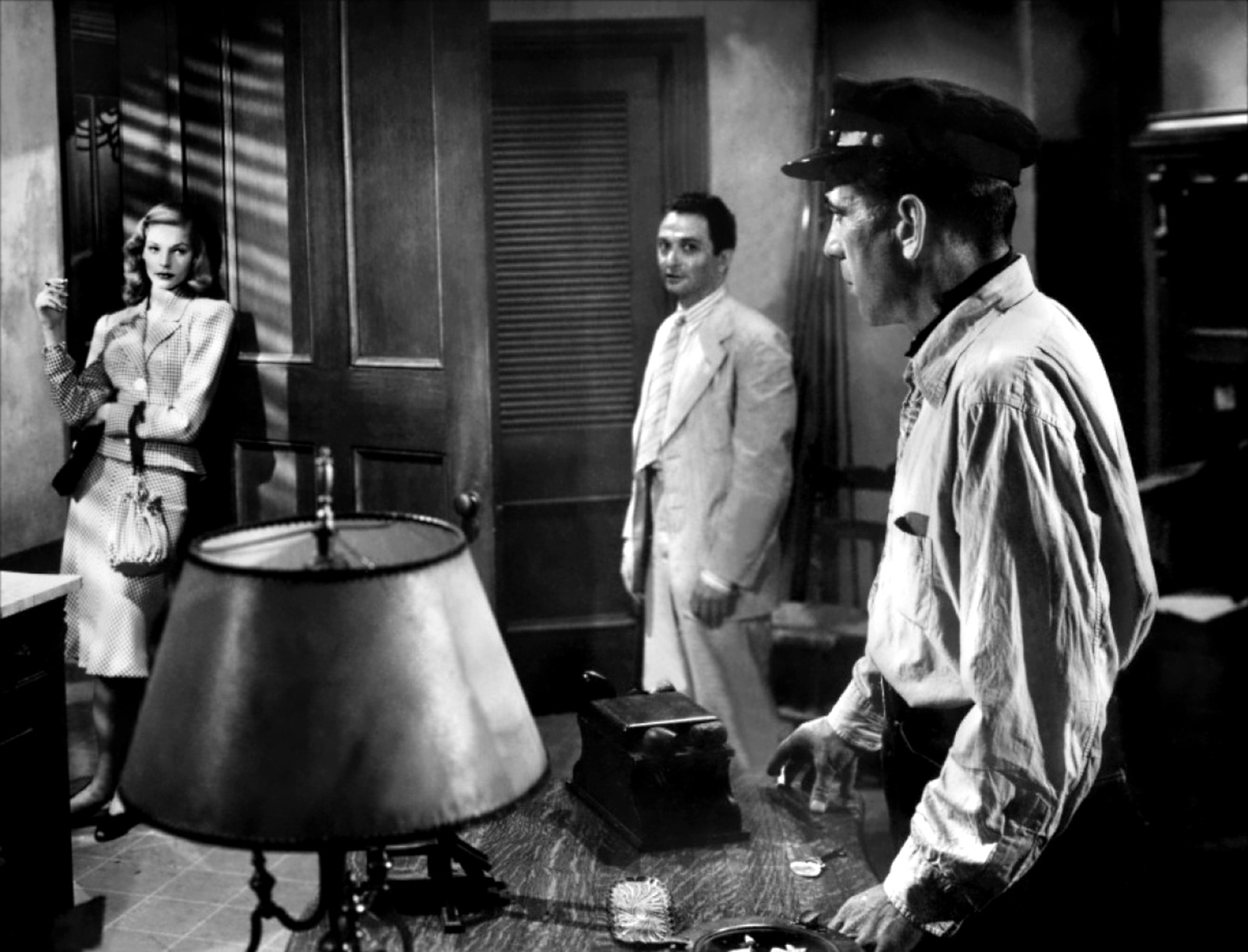
With Lauren Bacall and Marcel Dalio in To Have and Have Not (1944)

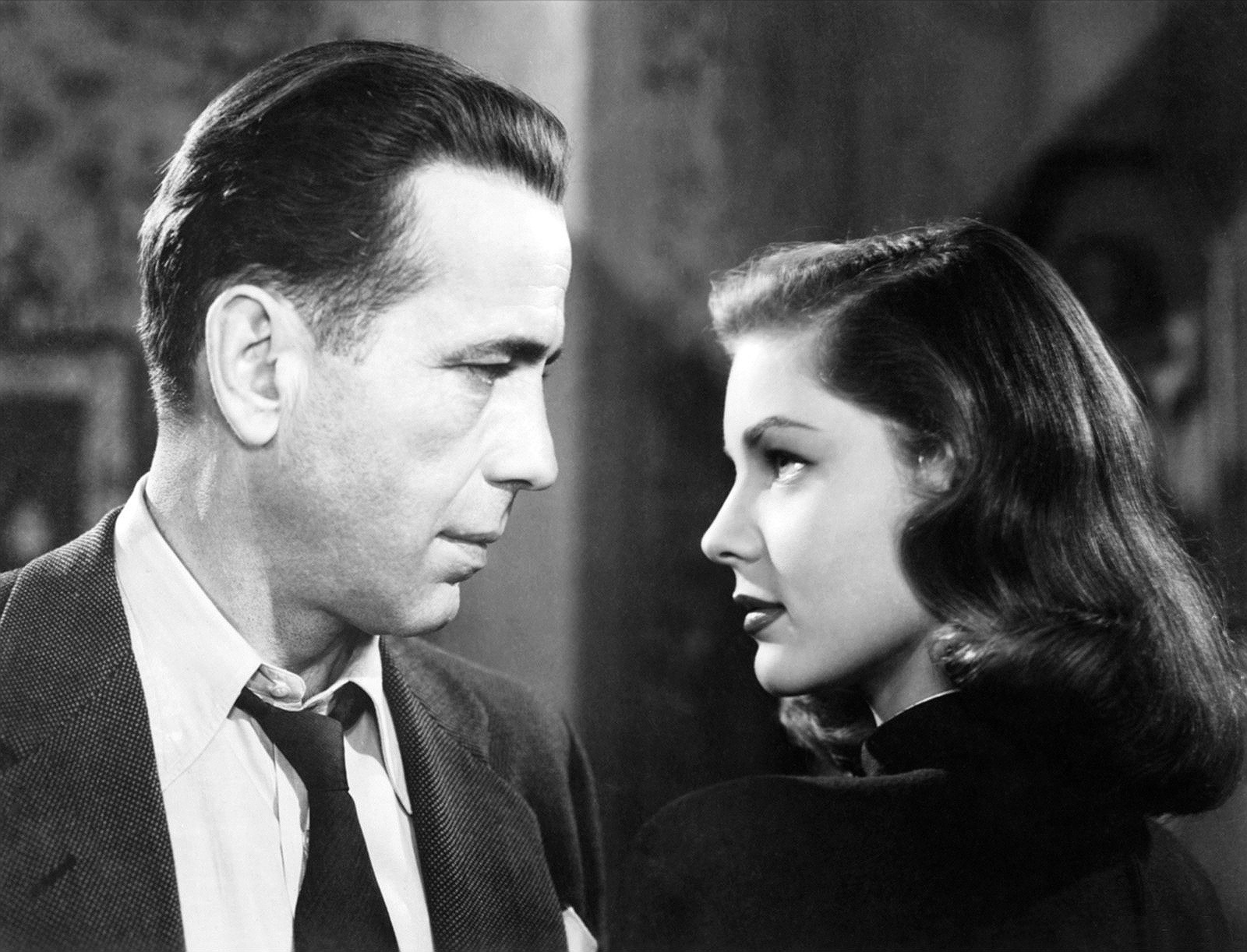
Bogart and Bacall in The Big Sleep (1946)

Howard Hawks introduced Bogart and Lauren Bacall while Bogart was filming Passage to Marseille (1944). The three subsequently collaborated on To Have and Have Not (1944), a loose adaptation of the Ernest Hemingway novel, and Bacall's film debut. It has several similarities to Casablanca: the same kind of hero and enemies, and a piano player (portrayed this time by Hoagy Carmichael) as a supporting character. When they met, Bacall was 19 and Bogart 44; he nicknamed her "Baby". A model since age 16, she had appeared in two failed plays. Bogart was attracted by Bacall's high cheekbones, green eyes, tawny blond hair, lean body, maturity, poise and earthy, outspoken honesty; he reportedly said, "I just saw your test. We'll have a lot of fun together".

Their emotional bond was strong from the start; their difference in age and acting-experience encouraged a mentor-student dynamic. In contrast to the Hollywood norm, their affair was Bogart's first with a leading lady. His early meetings with Bacall were discreet and brief, their separations bridged by love letters. The relationship made it easier for Bacall to make her first film, and Bogart did his best to put her at ease with jokes and quiet coaching. He encouraged her to steal scenes; Howard Hawks also did his best to highlight her role, and found Bogart easy to direct.

However, Hawks began to disapprove of the relationship. He considered himself Bacall's protector and mentor, and Bogart was usurping that role. Not usually drawn to his starlets, the married director also fell for Bacall; he told her that she meant nothing to Bogart and threatened to send her to the poverty-row studio Monogram Pictures. Bogart calmed her down, and then went after Hawks; Jack Warner settled the dispute, and filming resumed. Hawks said about Bacall, "Bogie fell in love with the character she played, so she had to keep playing it the rest of her life." However, Bacall wrote in her memoir about the love she and Bogart shared, "No one has ever written a romance better than we lived it." and she said regarding Bogart's personality, "He was a very gentle soul. He was very strong, and very sure about what he believed in and what he thought was important and not important. He couldn't be pushed around. But he was a gentle man. I was very, very lucky to have even met him, much less have been married to him. He had extraordinary gifts. He was much more of a complete individual than most people are. He had the kind of standards my mother had. Their values were very much the same. It was very interesting. He had tremendous character and a great sense of honor and would not tolerate lies, even if they asked him what he thought of a movie."

==== The Big Sleep ====
Months after wrapping To Have and Have Not, Bogart and Bacall were reunited for an encore: the film noir The Big Sleep (1946), based on the novel by Raymond Chandler with script help from William Faulkner. Chandler admired the actor's performance: "Bogart can be tough without a gun. Also, he has a sense of humor that contains that grating undertone of contempt." Although the film was completed and scheduled for release in 1945, it was withdrawn and re-edited to add scenes exploiting Bogart and Bacall's box-office chemistry in To Have and Have Not and the publicity surrounding their offscreen relationship. At the insistence of director Howard Hawks, production partner Charles K. Feldman agreed to a rewrite of Bacall's scenes to heighten the "insolent" quality which had intrigued critics such as James Agee and audiences of the earlier film, and a memo was sent to studio head Jack Warner.

The dialogue, especially in the added scenes supplied by Hawks, was full of sexual innuendo. The film was successful, although some critics found its plot confusing and overly complicated. According to Chandler, Hawks and Bogart argued about who killed the chauffeur; when Chandler received an inquiry by telegram, he could not provide an answer.

==== Marriage to Bacall ====
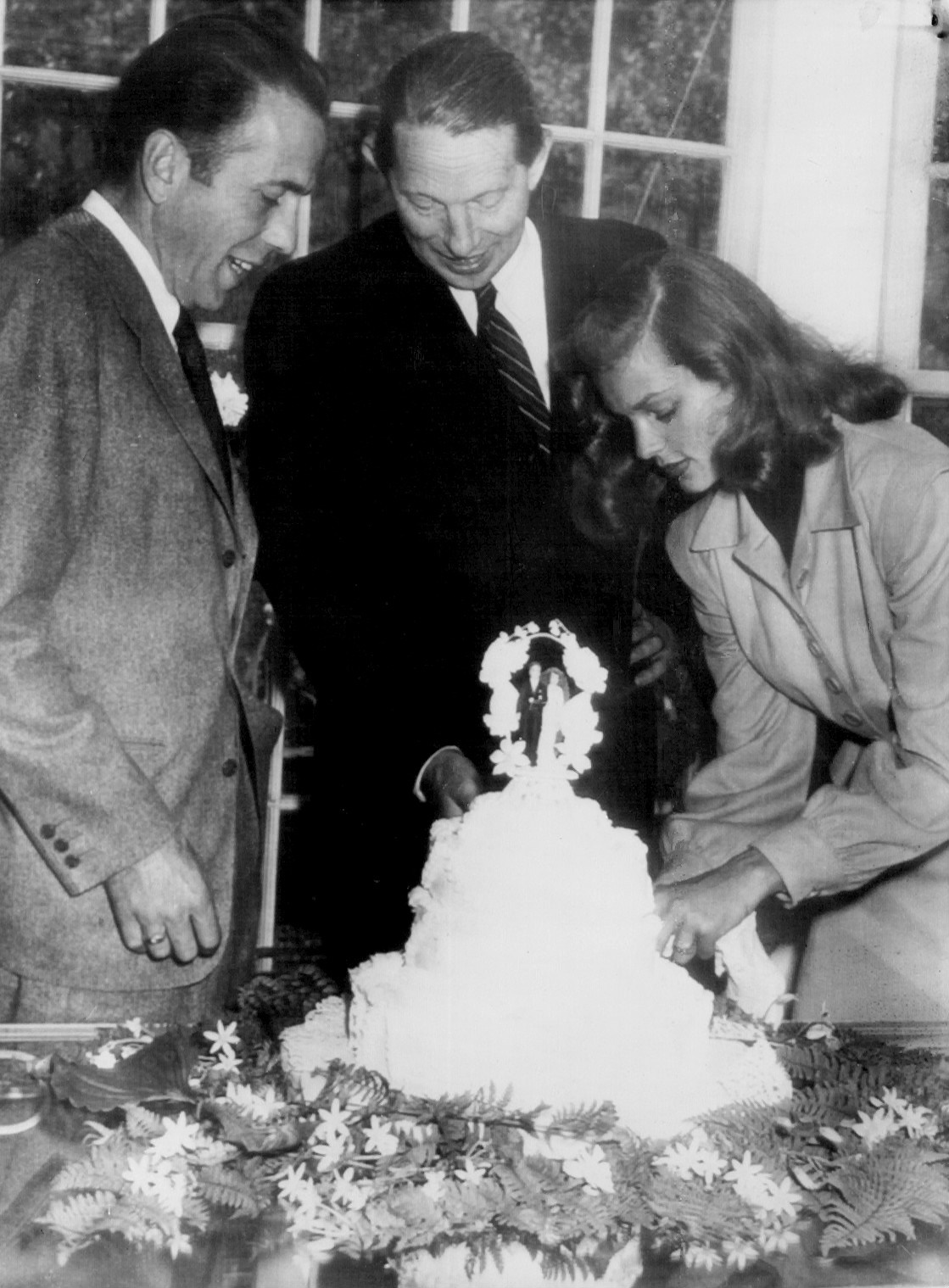
Bogart and Bacall's wedding in 1945

Bogart filed for divorce from Methot in February 1945. He and Bacall married in a small ceremony at the country home of Bogart's close friend, Pulitzer Prize-winning author Louis Bromfield, at Malabar Farm (near Lucas, Ohio) on May 21, 1945. They moved into a $160,000 ($2,860,000 in 2025) white brick mansion in an exclusive neighborhood of Los Angeles' Holmby Hills. At the time of the 1950 United States census, the couple was living at 2707 Benedict Canyon Drive in Beverly Hills with their son and nursemaid. Bacall is listed as Betty Bogart. The marriage was a mostly happy one but not without its troubles. Bogart's drinking was sometimes problematic and he initially wasn't happy about having his first child, fearing that it would create distance between himself and Bacall. He was a homebody, and Bacall liked the nightlife; he loved the sea, and it made her seasick. However, Bogart and Bacall never stopped loving each other, a fact Bacall mentions throughout her memoir By Myself. In a 1997 Parade magazine cover story, she told reporter Dotson Rader that Bogart said "'If you want a career more than anything, I will do everything I can to help you, and I will send you on your way, but I will not marry you. I've been through it, and I know it doesn't work.' He was right. He loved me and wanted me with him. I made the deal, and I stuck to it, and I'm damn glad that I did."

Bogart bought the Santana, a 55-foot (17 m) sailing yacht, from actor Dick Powell in 1945. He found the sea a sanctuary and spent about thirty weekends a year on the water, with a particular fondness for sailing around Catalina Island: "An actor needs something to stabilize his personality, something to nail down what he really is, not what he is currently pretending to be." Bogart joined the Coast Guard Temporary Reserve (a forerunner of the modern Coast Guard Auxiliary), offering the Coast Guard use of the Santana. He reportedly attempted to enlist, but was turned down due to his age.

==== Dark Passage and Key Largo ====
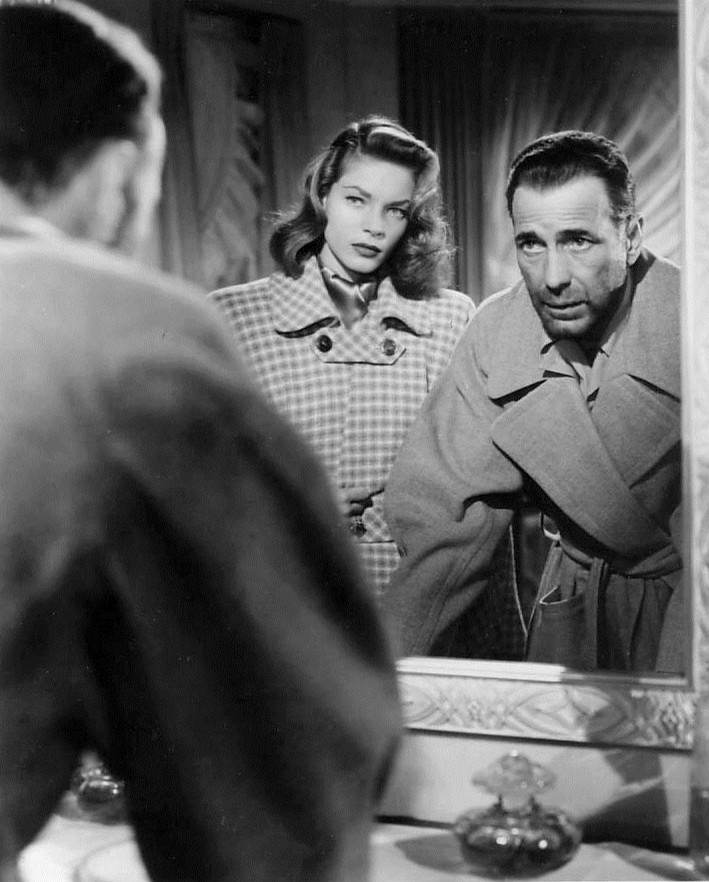
In Dark Passage (1947)

The suspenseful Dark Passage (1947) was Bogart and Bacall's next collaboration. Vincent Parry (Bogart) is intent on finding the real murderer for a crime of which he was convicted and sentenced to prison. According to Bogart's biographer, Stefan Kanfer, it was "a production line film noir with no particular distinction".

Bogart and Bacall's last pairing in a film was in Key Largo (1948). Directed by John Huston, Edward G. Robinson was billed second (behind Bogart) as gangster Johnny Rocco: a seething, older synthesis of many of his early bad-guy roles. The billing question was hard-fought and at the end of at least one of the trailers, Robinson is listed above Bogart in a list of the actors' names in the last frame; and in the film itself, Robinson's name, appearing between Bogart's and Bacall's, is pictured slightly higher onscreen than the other two. Robinson had top billing over Bogart in their four previous films together: Bullets or Ballots (1936), Kid Galahad (1937), The Amazing Dr. Clitterhouse (1938) and Brother Orchid (1940). In some posters for Key Largo, Robinson's picture is substantially larger than Bogart's, and in the foreground manhandling Bacall while Bogart is in the background. The characters are trapped during a hurricane in a hotel owned by Bacall's father-in-law, portrayed by Lionel Barrymore. Claire Trevor won an Academy Award for Best Supporting Actress for her performance as Rocco's physically abused, alcoholic girlfriend.

=== Later career ===
==== The Treasure of the Sierra Madre ====
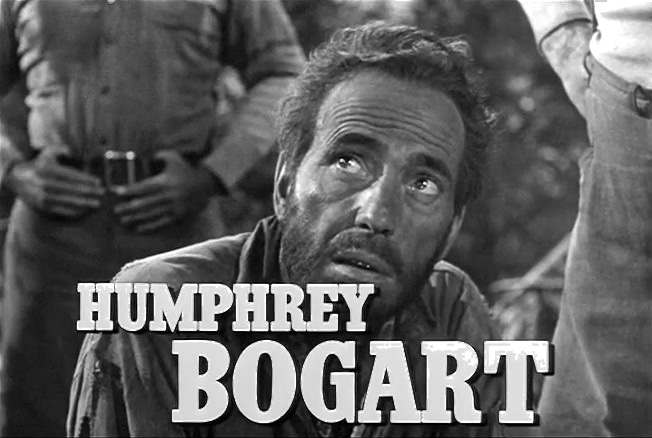
The Treasure of the Sierra Madre (1948)

Riding high in 1947 with a new 15-year contract with Warners which provided limited script refusal and the right to form his own production company, Bogart starred with Barbara Stanwyck in The Two Mrs. Carrolls, and later Bogart rejoined with John Huston for The Treasure of the Sierra Madre: a stark tale of greed among three gold prospectors in Mexico. Lacking a love interest or a happy ending, it was considered a risky project. Bogart later said about co-star (and John Huston's father) Walter Huston, "He's probably the only performer in Hollywood to whom I'd gladly lose a scene."

The film was shot in the heat of summer for greater realism and atmosphere and was grueling to make. James Agee wrote, "Bogart does a wonderful job with this character ... miles ahead of the very good work he has done before." Although John Huston won the Academy Award for Best Director and screenplay and his father won the Best Supporting Actor award, the film had mediocre box-office results. Bogart complained, "An intelligent script, beautifully directed—something different—and the public turned a cold shoulder on it."

==== House Un-American Activities Committee ====
Bogart, a liberal Democrat, organized the Committee for the First Amendment (a delegation to Washington, D.C.) opposing what he saw as the House Un-American Activities Committee's harassment of Hollywood screenwriters and actors. He later wrote an article, "I'm No Communist", for the March 1948 issue of Photoplay magazine distancing himself from the Hollywood Ten to counter negative publicity resulting from his appearance. Bogart wrote, "The ten men cited for contempt by the House Un-American Activities Committee were not defended by us."

==== Santana Productions ====
Bogart created his film company, Santana Productions (named after his yacht and the cabin cruiser in Key Largo), in 1948. The right to create his own company had left Jack Warner furious, fearful that other stars would do the same and further erode the major studios' power. In addition to pressure from freelancing actors such as Bogart, James Stewart, and Henry Fonda, they were beginning to buckle from the impact of television and the enforcement of antitrust laws which broke up theater chains. Bogart's new contract with Warners had required him to make one film a year for Warners but he only made Chain Lightning (1950) and The Enforcer (1951) for them during the contract period. In 1953, his contract with Warners was dissolved by mutual consent.

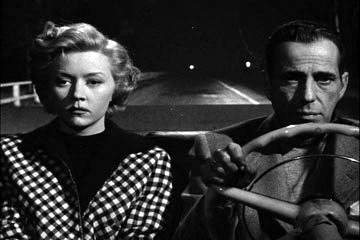
With Gloria Grahame in In a Lonely Place (1950)

Except for Beat the Devil (1953), originally distributed in the United States by United Artists, Santana released its films through Columbia Pictures; Columbia re-released Beat the Devil a decade later. In quick succession, Bogart starred in Knock on Any Door (1949), Tokyo Joe (1949), In a Lonely Place (1950), and Sirocco (1951). Santana also made two films without him: And Baby Makes Three (1949) and The Family Secret (1951).

Although most lost money at the box office (ultimately forcing Santana's sale), at least two retain a reputation; In a Lonely Place is considered a film-noir high point. Bogart plays Dixon Steele, an embittered writer with a violent reputation who is the primary suspect in the murder of a young woman and falls in love with failed actress Laurel Gray (Gloria Grahame). Several Bogart biographers, and actress-writer Louise Brooks, have felt that this role is closest to the real Bogart. According to Brooks, the film "gave him a role that he could play with complexity, because the film character's pride in his art, his selfishness, drunkenness, lack of energy stabbed with lightning strokes of violence were shared by the real Bogart". The character mimics some of Bogart's personal habits, twice ordering the actor's favorite meal (ham and eggs).

A parody of sorts of The Maltese Falcon, Beat the Devil was the final film for Bogart and John Huston. Co-written by Truman Capote, the eccentrically filmed story follows an amoral group of rogues, one of whom was portrayed by Peter Lorre, chasing an unattainable treasure. Bogart sold his interest in Santana to Columbia for over $1 million in 1955.

==== The African Queen ====
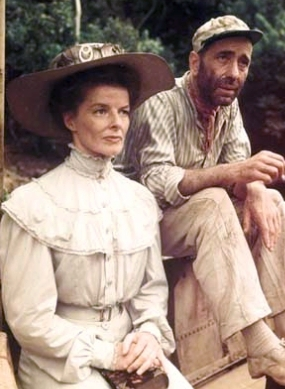
Hepburn and Bogart in The African Queen (1951)

Outside Santana Productions, Bogart starred with Katharine Hepburn in the John Huston-directed The African Queen in 1951. The C. S. Forester novel on which it was based was overlooked and left undeveloped for 15 years until producer Sam Spiegel and Huston bought the rights. Spiegel sent Katharine Hepburn the book; she suggested Bogart for the male lead, believing that "he was the only man who could have played that part". Huston's love of adventure, his deep, longstanding friendship (and success) with Bogart, and the chance to work with Hepburn convinced the actor to leave Hollywood for a difficult shoot on location in the Belgian Congo. Bogart was to get 30 percent of the profits and Hepburn 10 percent, plus a relatively small salary for both. The stars met in London and announced that they would work together.

Bacall came for the over-four-month duration, leaving their young son in Los Angeles. The Bogarts began the trip with a junket through Europe, including a visit with Pope Pius XII. Bacall later made herself useful as a cook, nurse and clothes washer; her husband said: "I don't know what we'd have done without her. She Luxed my undies in darkest Africa." Nearly everyone in the cast developed dysentery except Bogart and Huston, who subsisted on canned food and alcohol; Bogart said, "All I ate was baked beans, canned asparagus and Scotch whisky. Whenever a fly bit Huston or me, it dropped dead." Hepburn (a teetotaler) fared worse in the difficult conditions, losing weight and at one point becoming very ill. Bogart resisted Huston's insistence on using real leeches in a key scene where Charlie has to drag his steam launch through an infested marsh, and reasonable fakes were employed. The crew overcame illness, army-ant infestations, leaky boats, poor food, attacking hippos, poor water filters, extreme heat, isolation, and a boat fire to complete the film. Despite the discomfort of jumping from the boat into swamps, rivers and marshes, The African Queen apparently rekindled Bogart's early love of boats; when he returned to California, he bought a classic mahogany Hacker-Craft runabout which he kept until his death.

His performance as cantankerous skipper Charlie Allnut earned Bogart an Academy Award for Best Actor in 1951 (his only award of three nominations), and he considered it the best of his film career. Promising friends that if he won his speech would break the convention of thanking everyone in sight, Bogart advised Claire Trevor when she was nominated for Key Largo to "just say you did it all yourself and don't thank anyone". When Bogart won, however, he said: "It's a long way from the Belgian Congo to the stage of this theatre. It's nicer to be here. Thank you very much ... No one does it alone. As in tennis, you need a good opponent or partner to bring out the best in you. John and Katie helped me to be where I am now." Despite the award and its accompanying recognition, Bogart later said: "The way to survive an Oscar is never to try to win another one ... too many stars ... win it and then figure they have to top themselves ... they become afraid to take chances. The result: A lot of dull performances in dull pictures." The African Queen was Bogart's first starring Technicolor role.

==== The Caine Mutiny ====
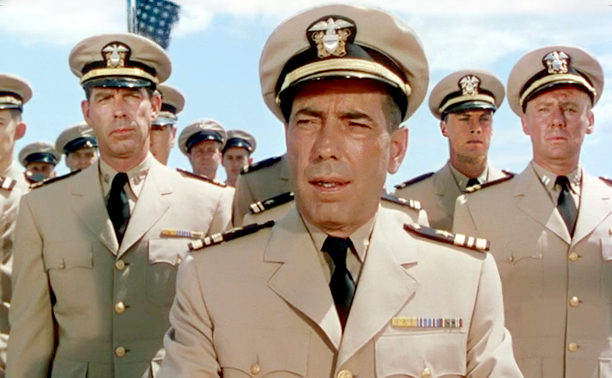
In The Caine Mutiny trailer with Fred MacMurray, Robert Francis and Van Johnson

Bogart dropped his asking price to obtain the role of Captain Queeg in Edward Dmytryk's drama, The Caine Mutiny (1954). Though he retained some of his old bitterness about having to do so, he delivered a strong performance in the lead; he received his final Oscar nomination and was the subject of a June 7, 1954, Time magazine cover story.

Despite his success, Bogart was still melancholy; he grumbled to (and feuded with) the studio, while his health began to deteriorate. Like his portrayal of Fred C. Dobbs in The Treasure of the Sierra Madre, Bogart's Queeg is a paranoid, self-pitying character whose small-mindedness eventually destroys him. Henry Fonda played a different role in the Broadway version of The Caine Mutiny, generating publicity for the film.

==== Final roles ====
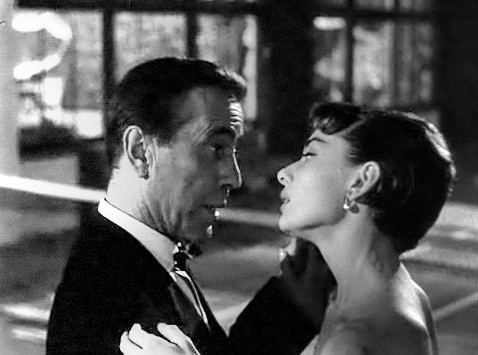
With Audrey Hepburn in Sabrina trailer

For Sabrina (1954), Billy Wilder wanted Cary Grant for the older male lead but chose Bogart to play the conservative brother who competes with his younger, playboy sibling (William Holden) for the affection of the Cinderella-like Sabrina (Audrey Hepburn). Although Bogart was lukewarm about the part, he agreed to it on a handshake with Wilder without a finished script but with the director's assurance that he would take good care of Bogart during filming. The actor, however, got along poorly with his director and co-stars; he complained about the script's last-minute drafting and delivery, and accused Wilder of favoring Hepburn and Holden on and off the set. Wilder was the opposite of Bogart's ideal director (John Huston) in style and personality; Bogart complained to the press that Wilder was "overbearing" and "is [a] kind of Prussian German with a riding crop. He is the type of director I don't like to work with ... the picture is a crock of crap. I got sick and tired of who gets Sabrina." Wilder later said, "We parted as enemies but finally made up." Despite the acrimony, the film was successful; according to a review in The New York Times, Bogart was "incredibly adroit ... the skill with which this old rock-ribbed actor blends the gags and such duplicities with a manly manner of melting is one of the incalculable joys of the show".

Joseph L. Mankiewicz's The Barefoot Contessa (1954) was filmed in Rome. In this Hollywood backstory, Bogart is a broken-down man, a cynical director-narrator who saves his career by making a star of a flamenco dancer modeled on Rita Hayworth. He was uneasy with Ava Gardner in the female lead; she had just broken up with his Rat Pack buddy Frank Sinatra, and Bogart was annoyed by her inexperienced performance. The actor was generally praised as the film's strongest part. During filming and while Bacall was home, Bogart resumed his discreet affair with Verita Bouvaire-Thompson (his long-time studio assistant, whom he drank with and took sailing). When Bacall found them together, she extracted an expensive shopping spree from her husband; the three traveled together after the shooting.

Bogart could be generous with actors, particularly those who were blacklisted, down on their luck or having personal problems. During the filming of the Edward Dmytryk–directed The Left Hand of God (1955), he noticed his co-star Gene Tierney having a hard time remembering her lines and behaving oddly; he coached her, feeding Tierney her lines. Familiar with mental illness because of his sister's bouts of depression, Bogart encouraged Tierney to seek treatment. He also stood behind Joan Bennett and insisted on her as his co-star in Michael Curtiz's We're No Angels (1955) when a scandal made her persona non grata with studio head Jack Warner.

Bogart shot The Harder They Fall, a boxing drama with Rod Steiger in a supporting role. Steiger later mentioned Bogart's courage and geniality during his final performance:

Bogey and I got on very well. Unlike some other stars, when they had closeups, you might have been relegated to a two-shot, or cut out altogether. Bogey didn't play those games. He was a professional and had tremendous authority. He'd come in exactly at 9 a.m. and leave at precisely 6 p.m. I remember once walking to lunch in between takes and seeing Bogey on the lot. I shouldn't have because his work was finished for the day. I asked him why he was still on the lot, and he said, "They want to shoot some retakes of my closeups because my eyes are too watery". A little while later, after the film, somebody came up to me with word of Bogey's death. Then it struck me. His eyes were watery because he was in pain with the cancer. I thought: "How dumb can you be Rodney!"

==== Television and radio ====
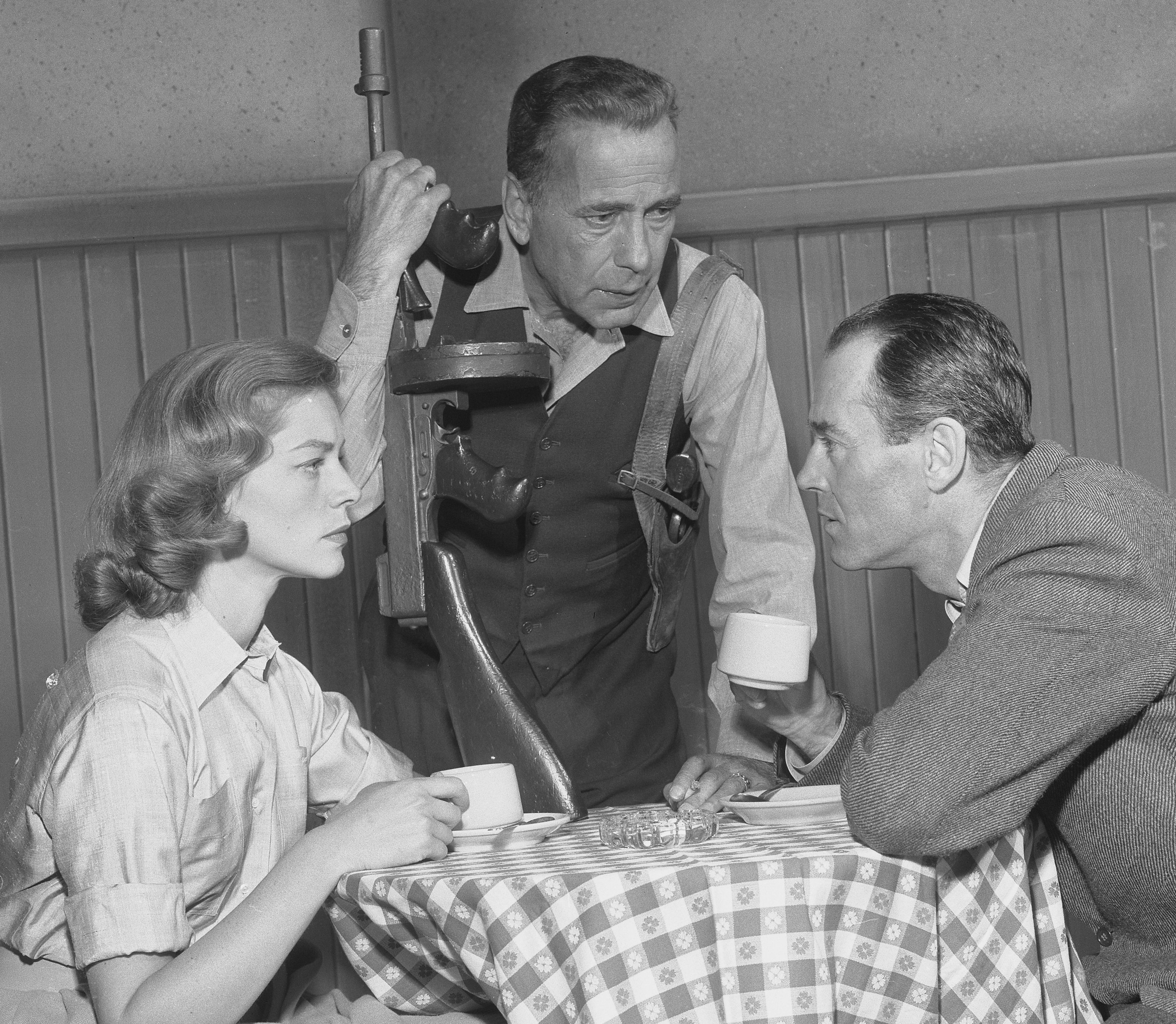
With Bacall and Henry Fonda in the televised version of The Petrified Forest, 1955

Bogart rarely performed on television, but he and Bacall appeared on Edward R. Murrow's Person to Person and disagreed on the answer to every question. He also appeared on The Jack Benny Program, where a surviving kinescope of the live telecast captures him in his only TV sketch-comedy performance (October 25, 1953).

Bogart and Bacall worked on an early color telecast in 1955, an NBC adaptation of "The Petrified Forest" for Producers' Showcase. Bogart received top billing, Henry Fonda played Leslie Howard's role and Bacall played Bette Davis's part. Jack Klugman, Richard Jaeckel, and Jack Warden played supporting roles. In the late 1990s, Bacall donated the only known kinescope of the 1955 performance (in black and white) to the Museum of Television & Radio (now the Paley Center for Media), where it remains archived for viewing in New York City and Los Angeles. It is now in the public domain.

Bogart also performed radio adaptations of some of his best-known films, such as Casablanca and The Maltese Falcon, and recorded a radio series entitled Bold Venture with Bacall.

== Personal life ==
=== Children ===
Bogart became a father at age 49, when Bacall gave birth to their son Stephen Humphrey Bogart on January 6, 1949, during the filming of Tokyo Joe. The name was taken from Steve, Bogart's character's nickname in To Have and Have Not. Stephen became an author and biographer and hosted a television special about his father on Turner Classic Movies. The couple's second child, Leslie Howard Bogart, was born on August 23, 1952. Her first and middle names honor Leslie Howard, Bogart's friend and co-star in The Petrified Forest.

=== Rat Pack ===
Bogart was a founding member and the original leader of the Hollywood Rat Pack. In the spring of 1955, after a long party in Las Vegas attended by Frank Sinatra, Judy Garland and her husband Sidney Luft, Michael Romanoff and his wife Gloria, David Niven, Angie Dickinson and others, Bacall surveyed the wreckage and said: "You look like a goddamn rat pack."

The name stuck and was made official at Romanoff's in Beverly Hills. Sinatra was dubbed pack president; Bacall den mother; Bogart director of public relations, and Sid Luft acting cage manager. Asked by columnist Earl Wilson what the group's purpose was, Bacall replied: "To drink a lot of bourbon and stay up late."

=== Extended family and ancestors ===
Bogart is descended from Mayflower passengers John Tilley, Joan (Hurst) Rogers, Elizabeth Tilley, and John Howland.

=== Illness and death ===
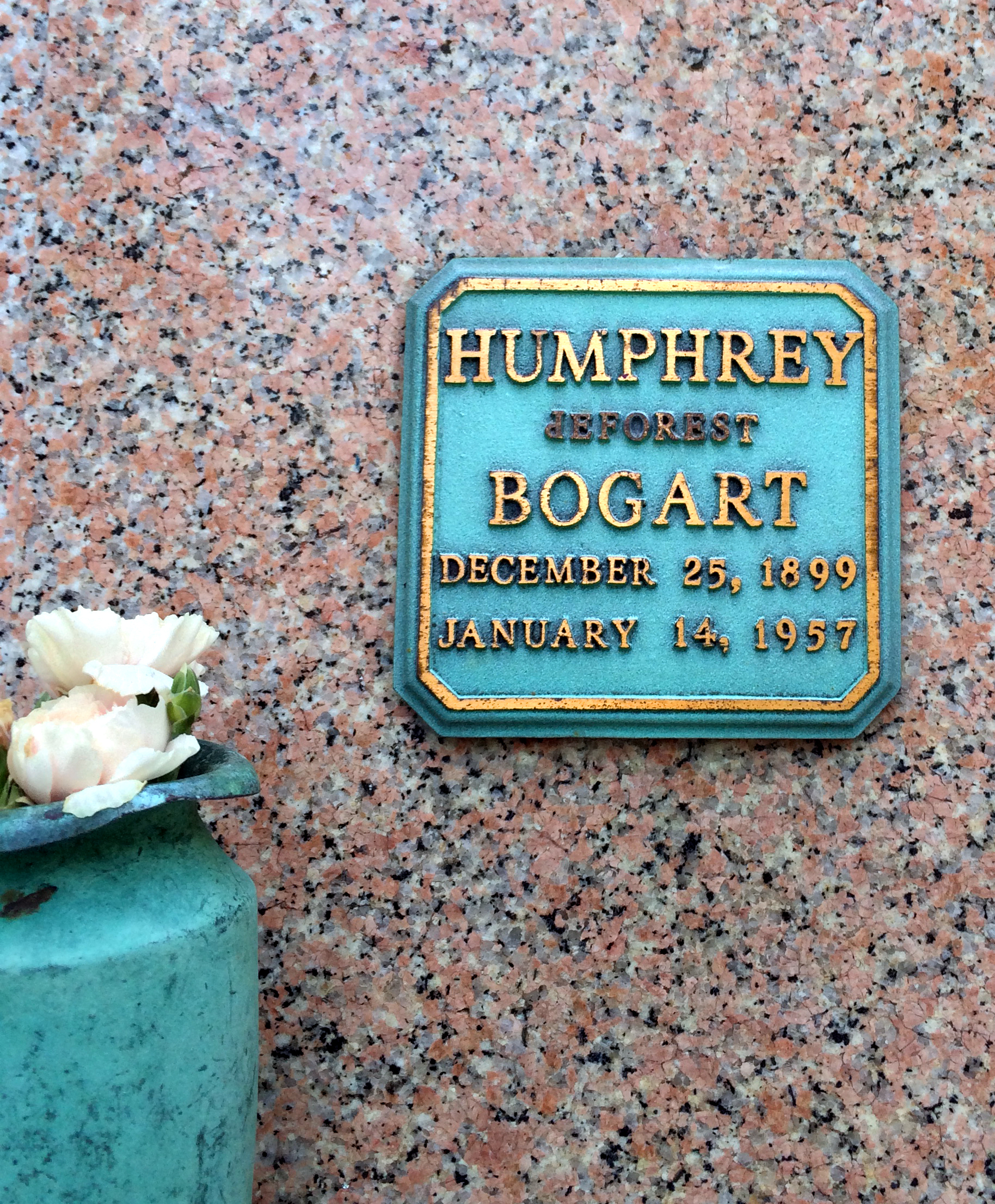
Bogart's niche in the Columbarium of Eternal Light, Garden of Memory of Forest Lawn Memorial Park in Glendale, California

After signing a long-term deal with Warner Bros., Bogart predicted with glee that his teeth and hair would fall out before the contract ended. By 1955, however, his health was failing. In the wake of Santana, Bogart had formed a new company and had plans for a film (Melville Goodwin, U.S.A.) in which he would play a general and Bacall a press magnate. His persistent cough and difficulty eating became too serious to ignore, though, and he dropped the project. The film was re-tooled as Top Secret Affair and released just two weeks after Bogart's death in 1957, with Kirk Douglas and Susan Hayward replacing Bogart and Bacall.

A heavy smoker and drinker, Bogart had developed esophageal cancer by 1955. He did not talk about his health, and visited a doctor in January 1956 after considerable persuasion from Bacall. The disease worsened and several weeks later, on March 1, Bogart had surgery to remove his esophagus, two lymph nodes and a rib. The surgery was unsuccessful, and chemotherapy followed. He had additional surgery in November 1956, when the cancer had metastasized. Although he became too weak to walk up and down stairs, he joked despite the pain: "Put me in the dumbwaiter and I'll ride down to the first floor in style." It was then altered to accommodate his wheelchair. Frank Sinatra, Katharine Hepburn, and Spencer Tracy visited him on January 13, 1957. In an interview, Hepburn said:

Spence patted him on the shoulder and said, "Goodnight, Bogie." Bogie turned his eyes to Spence very quietly and with a sweet smile covered Spence's hand with his own and said, "Goodbye, Spence." Spence's heart stood still. He understood.

Bogart lapsed into a coma and died the following day; at the time of his death, he weighed only 80 pounds (36 kg). A simple funeral was held at All Saints Episcopal Church, with music by Bogart's favorite composers: Johann Sebastian Bach and Claude Debussy. Among those who attended Bogart's funeral were Mary Astor, Ingrid Bergman, James Cagney, Harry Cohn, Bing Crosby, Olivia de Havilland, Errol Flynn, Henry Fonda, James Mason, Gregory Peck, David O. Selznick and Jack L. Warner. Bacall asked Tracy to give the eulogy; he was too upset, however, and John Huston spoke instead:

Himself, he never took his work too seriously. He regarded the somewhat gaudy figure of Bogart, the star, with an amused cynicism; Bogart, the actor, he held in deep respect ... In each of the fountains at Versailles there is a pike which keeps all the carp active; otherwise they would grow over-fat and die. Bogie took rare delight in performing a similar duty in the fountains of Hollywood. Yet his victims seldom bore him any malice, and when they did, not for long. His shafts were fashioned only to stick into the outer layer of complacency, and not to penetrate through to the regions of the spirit where real injuries are done ... He is quite irreplaceable. There will never be another like him.

Bogart was cremated, and his ashes were interred in Forest Lawn Memorial Park's Columbarium of Eternal Light in its Garden of Memory in Glendale, California. He was buried with a small, gold whistle that had been part of a charm bracelet he had given to Bacall before they married. On it was inscribed, "If you want anything, just whistle." This alluded to a scene in To Have and Have Not when Bacall's character says to Bogart shortly after their first meeting, "You know how to whistle, don't you, Steve? You just put your lips together and blow." Bogart's estate had a gross value of $910,146 and a net value of $737,668.

== Reception ==
Raymond Chandler, in a 1946 letter, wrote that "Like Edward G. Robinson when he was younger, all he has to do to dominate a scene is to enter it." Regarding her husband's enduring popularity, Bacall later said, "There was something that made him able to be a man of his own, and it showed through his work. There was also a purity, which is amazing considering the parts he played. Something solid, too. I think as time goes by, we all believe less and less. Here was someone who believed in something." His character Blaine in Casablanca was ranked as the fourth greatest hero of American cinema by the American Film Institute, and Blaine and Lund's romance the greatest love story in American cinema, also by the American Film Institute.

== Awards and honors ==
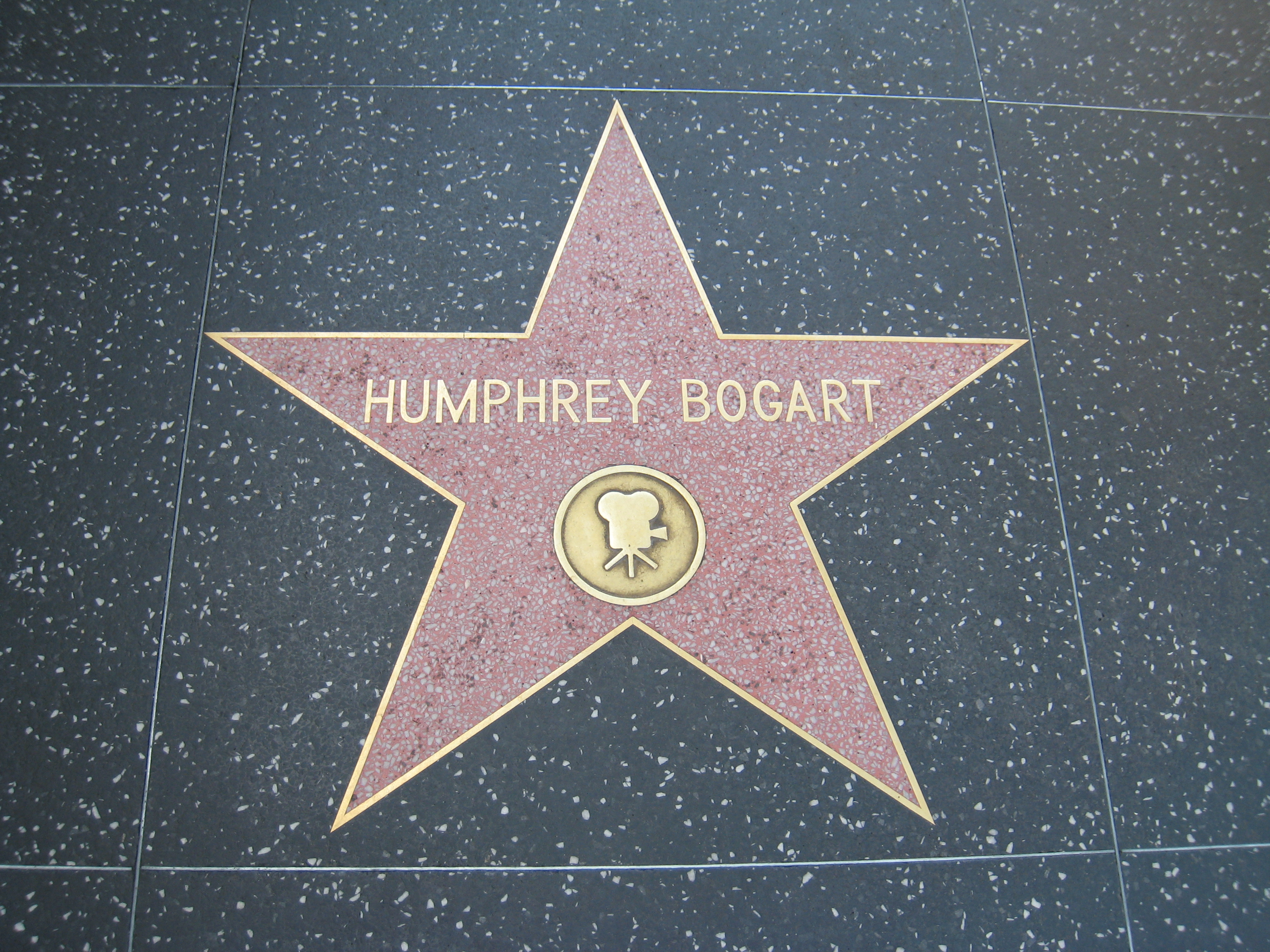
Bogart's star on the Walk of Fame, at 6322 Hollywood Boulevard

On August 21, 1946, he recorded his hand- and footprints in cement in a ceremony at Grauman's Chinese Theatre. On February 8, 1960, Bogart was posthumously inducted into the Hollywood Walk of Fame with a motion-picture star at 6322 Hollywood Boulevard. There is a street named after Bogart in San Antonio, Texas.

Academy Awards
Year	Award	Film	Result
1944	Best Actor	Casablanca	Nominated
1952	Best Actor	The African Queen	Won
1955	Best Actor	The Caine Mutiny	Nominated

== Legacy and tributes ==
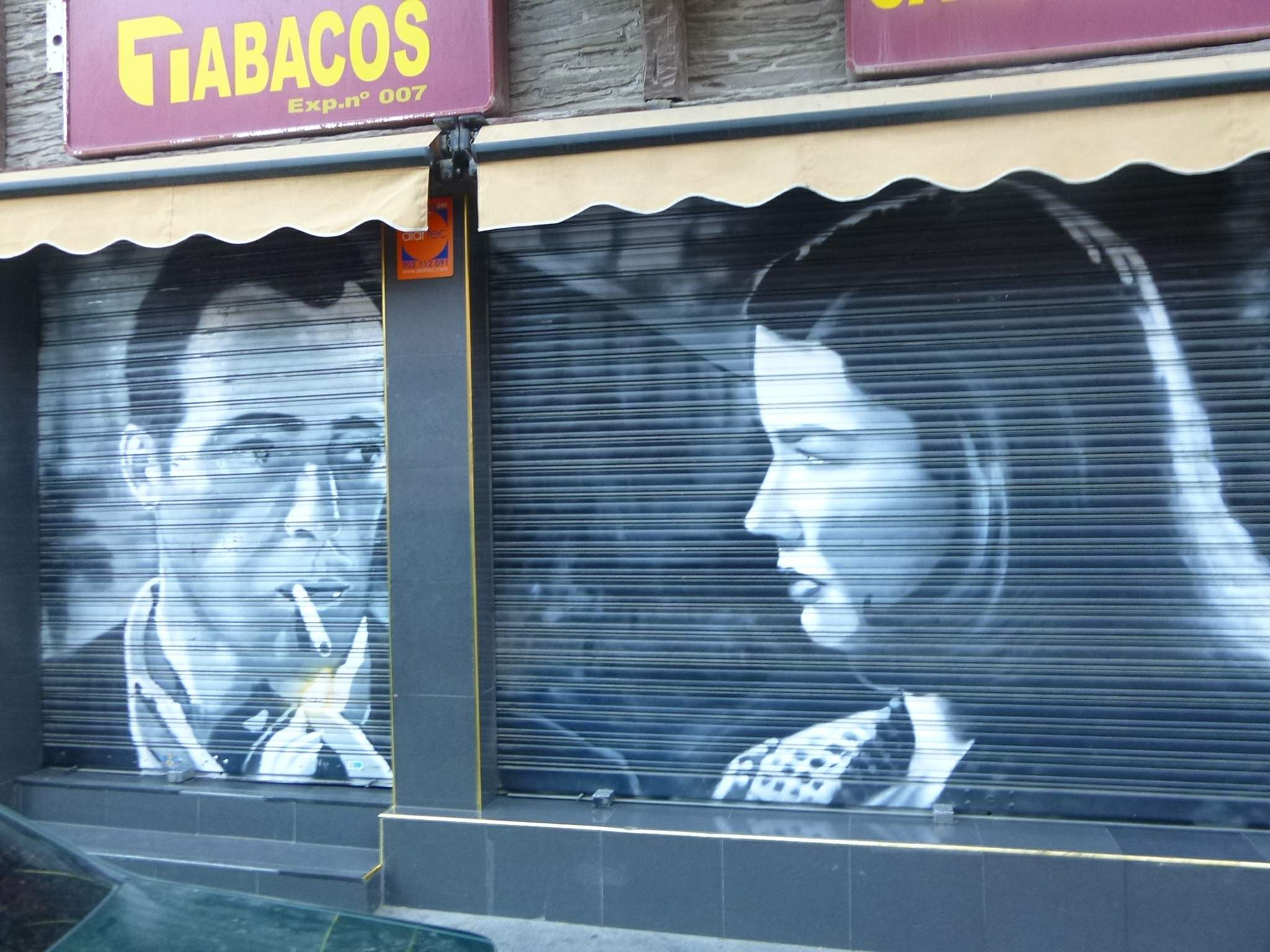
2015 street art of Bogart and Bacall in Spain

After his death, a "Bogie cult" formed at the Brattle Theatre in Cambridge, Massachusetts, in Greenwich Village, and in France; this contributed to his increased popularity during the late 1950s and 1960s. In 1997, Entertainment Weekly magazine ranked Bogart the number-one movie legend of all time; two years later, the American Film Institute rated him the greatest male screen legend.

Jean-Luc Godard's Breathless (1960) was the first film to pay tribute to Bogart. Over a decade later, in Woody Allen's comic paean Play It Again, Sam (1972), Bogart's ghost aids Allen's character: a film critic having difficulties with women who says that his "sex life has turned into the 'Petrified Forest'".

Humphrey Bogart and Marilyn Monroe were the first two people to perform again in a film as virtual actors after their death. A digital virtual replica of Bogart "performed" alongside a virtual copy of Monroe in the 1987 short film Rendez-vous in Montreal. The film received widespread attention at the time and was considered a technological breakthrough.

The United States Postal Service honored Bogart with a stamp in its "Legends of Hollywood" series in 1997, the third figure recognized. At a ceremony attended by Lauren Bacall and the Bogart children, Stephen and Leslie, USPS governing-board chair Tirso del Junco delivered a tribute:

"Today, we mark another chapter in the Bogart legacy. With an image that is small and yet as powerful as the ones he left in celluloid, we will begin today to bring his artistry, his power, his unique star quality, to the messages that travel the world."

On June 24, 2006, 103rd Street between Broadway and West End Avenue in New York City was renamed Humphrey Bogart Place. Lauren Bacall and her son, Stephen Bogart, attended the ceremony. "Bogie would never have believed it", she said to the assembled city officials and onlookers.

=== In popular culture ===
Bogart has inspired multiple artists.

- Two Bugs Bunny cartoons featured impersonations of the actor: Slick Hare (1947) and 8 Ball Bunny (1950, based on The Treasure of the Sierra Madre).
- The Man with Bogart's Face (1980, starring Bogart lookalike Robert Sacchi) was an homage to the actor.
- Al Stewart's 1976 song "Year of the Cat" was influenced by Casablanca and begins with the line "In a morning from a Bogart movie, in a country where they turn back time..."
- The lyrics of Bertie Higgins' 1981 song "Key Largo" refer to two of Bogart's films, Key Largo and Casablanca.
- In 2023, notable artist William Kentridge included a drawing of Bogart in his solo museum exhibition at The Broad in Los Angeles.
- The musical group Roxy Music paid homage to Bogart in their 1972 song "2HB". The song was later covered in the 1998 film Velvet Goldmine.

== Notable radio appearances ==
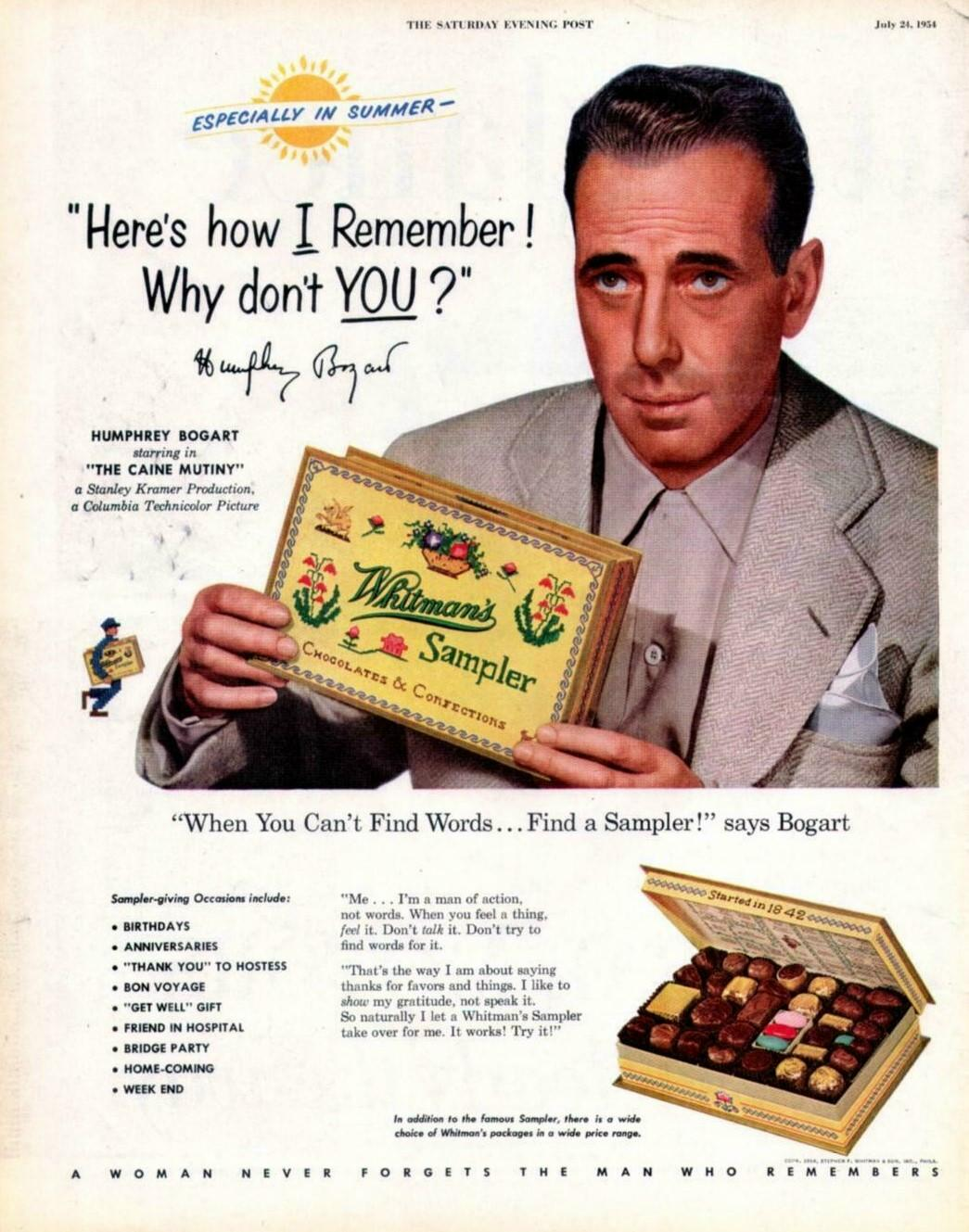
Magazine ad in 1954

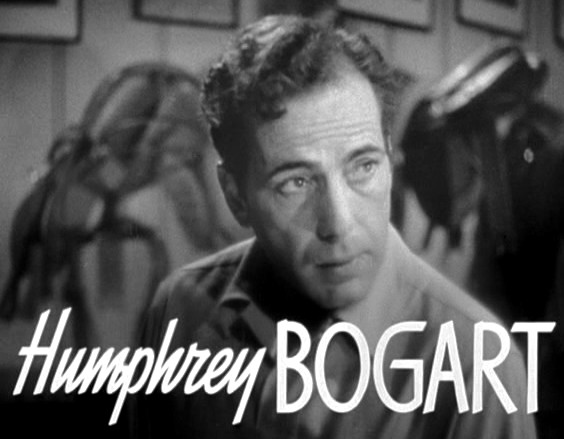
Trailer for Dark Victory, 1939

Date	Program	Episode
April 17, 1939	Lux Radio Theatre	Bullets or Ballots
1940	The Gulf Screen Guild Theater	The Petrified Forest
1941	The Gulf Screen Guild Theater	If Only She Could Cook
1941	The Gulf Screen Guild Theater	The Amazing Dr. Clitterhouse
1941	The Gulf Screen Guild Theater	If You Could Only Cook
January 4, 1942	The Screen Guild Theater	High Sierra
1943	The Screen Guild Theater	Casablanca
September 20, 1943	The Screen Guild Theater	The Maltese Falcon
1944	Screen Guild Players	High Sierra
April 30, 1945	Lux Radio Theatre	Moontide
July 3, 1946	Academy Award Theater	The Maltese Falcon
1946	Lux Radio Theatre	To Have and Have Not
April 18, 1949	Lux Radio Theatre	Treasure of the Sierra Madre
1951–52	Bold Venture	78-episode series
1952	Stars in the Air	The House on 92nd Street
1952	Lux Radio Theatre	The African Queen

== See also ==
- Bogart–Bacall syndrome
- List of actors with Academy Award nominations
- List of amateur chess players
- List of members of the American Legion
