= Maud Humphrey =

American commercial illustrator, watercolorist, and suffragette

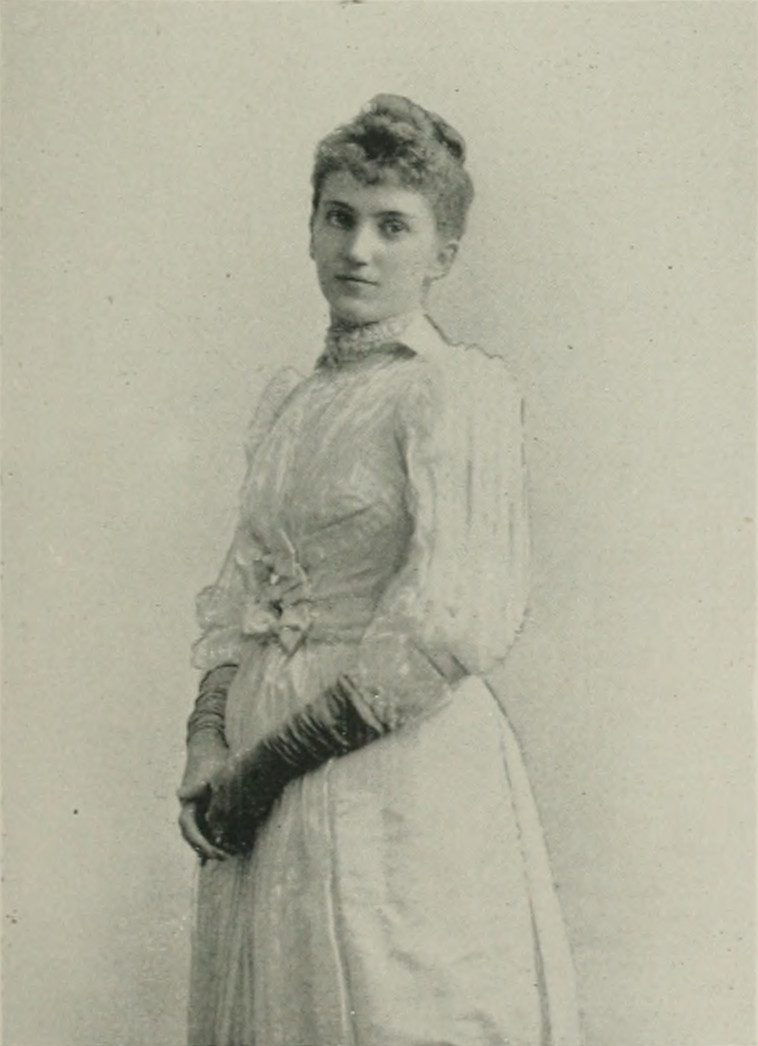
Humphrey in 1893 or 1897

Maud Humphrey (March 30, 1868 – November 22, 1940) was a commercial illustrator, watercolorist, and suffragette from the United States. She was the mother of the actor Humphrey Bogart and frequently used her young son as a model.

== Biography ==
Humphrey was born in Rochester, New York in 1868 to John Perkins Humphrey and Frances V. Dewey Churchill. She studied at the Art Students League of New York and in Paris at the Julian Academy.

She married Belmont DeForest Bogart (1867–1934); they had one son, Humphrey, and two daughters.

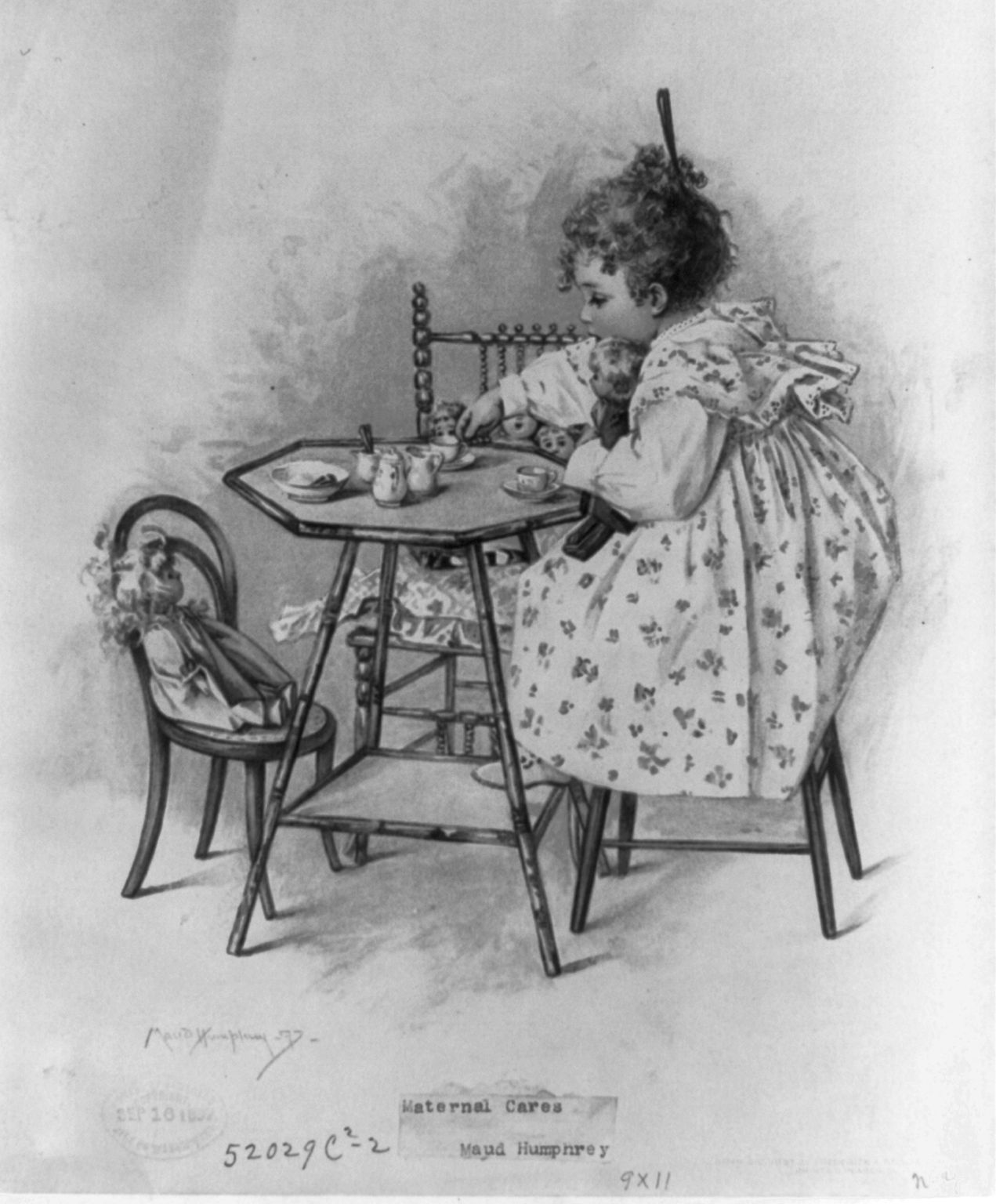
Maternal cares by Humphrey, c. 1897

She won a Louis Prang and Company competition for Christmas card design and then began working for the New York publisher Frederick A. Stokes as an illustrator. From the 1890s through the 1920s, her work included child portraits, "illustrating calendars, greeting cards, postcards, fashion magazines, and more than 20 story books".

Her artwork featuring children garnered the moniker the "Humphrey Baby," and her work was used by advertising agencies in campaigns for Anheuser-Busch beer, Butterick Patterns, Crossman Brothers Flower Seeds, Ivory Soap, Mellin Baby Food, Equitable Insurance, and Metropolitan Life Insurance. She earned more than $50,000 a year (roughly $750,000 in 2023 dollars), while her husband's surgical practice brought in $20,000 a year (roughly $300,000 in 2023 dollars).

E. Richards McKinstry of the Winterthur Museum, Garden and Library has addressed rumors that Maud Humphrey used her son as the model for the Gerber Products logo illustration by observing that this illustration was not created until Humphrey Bogart was an adult — and that Maud Humphrey was not the illustrator who created it.

Maud Humphrey died in 1940 at age 72 and was interred in the Columbarium of Protection in the Gardenia Terrace section of the Great Mausoleum at Forest Lawn Memorial Park (Glendale).
