= Verita Bouvaire-Thompson =

American hairdresser and actress (1918–2008)

- Born: February 9, 1918
- Died: February 1, 2008 (aged 89)
- Occupations: Actress, hairdresser
- Partner: Humphrey Bogart (1945–1957; his death)

Verita Bouvaire-Thompson (9 February 1918 – 1 February 2008) was an American actress turned hairdresser who reputedly had a 14-year affair with actor Humphrey Bogart.

== Biography ==
Thompson was born in Nogales, Arizona, to an Irish American father and a Mexican mother and was raised by her paternal grandparents, living most of her youth in northern Mexico.

After graduating from high school and coming second in the 1935 Miss Arizona Pageant she was discovered by a Hollywood talent scout and signed a contract with Republic Pictures. During the filming of her first film she fell off a horse and broke her arm. Back in Mexico she met a hairdresser and wig maker with whom she formed a partnership. Upon returning to Hollywood her patrons were Charles Boyer, Gary Cooper, Ray Milland, George Raft and finally, Humphrey Bogart.

According to Thompson, her association with Bogart started in 1942, when he was still married to his third wife, Mayo Methot, in a union noted for its stormy, sometimes physically violent arguments. In 1949 she became his personal hairdresser and worked on all but four of Bogarts's last 18 pictures.

Thompson later moved to New Orleans. When Hurricane Katrina was about to hit the city, she is alleged to have refused the offer of a private jet, stating, "Lauren Bacall failed to chase me out of Hollywood. Katrina won't force me out of New Orleans.”

Thompson was the author of the 1982 autobiography, Bogie and Me: The Love Story of Humphrey Bogart and Verita Thompson.

In a 2011 biography of Humphrey Bogart, the relationship is mentioned and labeled as unverified, though under the premise that Bogart had quietly begun to seek the company of other women, including his ex-wife Helen Menken and his personal hairdresser, "a spirited little brunette named Verita Thompson." The author then quotes Thompson as saying that, "'Often he'd stay the night usually leaving for the studio around five in the morning."

Others confirm that a relationship began in 1942. While the fact of the extramarital affair is downplayed, the fact that she was his hairdresser is well established.

She provided some celebrity at the Resurrection Party of the Century—a re-enactment of Truman Capote's 1966 Black and White Ball extravaganza—at the Queen Anne Ballroom in New Orleans on November 28, 2006. This was exactly four decades following Capote's blowout to celebrate the publication of In Cold Blood.
