= United States Coast Guard Reserve =

Reserve component of the United States Coast Guard

- Seal of the United States Coast Guard Reserve.
- Active: Civilian reserve: 1939–1941; Military reserve: 1941–present
- Country: United States of America
- Branch: United States Coast Guard
- Role: Maritime homeland security, domestic and expeditionary support to national defense, and domestic, natural or man-made, disaster response and recovery.
- Size: 7,724 (6,293 Ready Reserve, 1,431 Inactive Reserve)
- Part of: U.S. Department of Homeland Security; Reserve components of the United States Armed Forces
- Mottos: "Professionalism, Patriotism, Preparedness!"
- Engagements: World War II; Persian Gulf War: Operation Desert Shield; Operation Desert Storm; War on terror; Operation Iraqi Freedom
- Website: reserve.uscg.mil

Commanders
- Current commander: Assistant Commandant for Reserve (CG-R), Rear Admiral Tiffany G. Danko, USCG

The United States Coast Guard Reserve is the reserve component of the United States Coast Guard. It is organized, trained, administered, and supplied under the direction of the commandant of the Coast Guard through the assistant commandant for reserve (CG-R).

== Mission ==
The mission of the Coast Guard Reserve is stated in the Reserve Policy Statement issued in 2018:

Serving as the Coast Guard's only dedicated surge force the Reserve Component is a contingency-based workforce, trained locally and deployed globally to provide appropriately trained personnel to meet mission requirements within the prioritized focus areas of Defense Operations, Ports, Waterways, and Coastal Security, Incident Response and Management, & Mission Support.

== History ==
The United States Coast Guard Reserve was originally established on 23 June 1939 as a civilian reserve. This civilian reserve was renamed the United States Coast Guard Auxiliary on the passage of the Coast Guard Reserve and Auxiliary Act of 19 February 1941 and the military reserve commenced operations at that time.

=== World War II ===
Persons joining the Coast Guard after 1 February 1942 were signed on as regular reservists and were obligated to serve for "the duration plus six" months. These reservists served in every type of job that the Coast Guard had been tasked.

Uniquely among the Armed Forces, the Coast Guard was also given the authority to appoint other volunteers as "temporary reservists" without regard to age and physical fitness. These temporary reservists were generally drawn from the Coast Guard Auxiliary and were, essentially, unpaid part-time service members utilized stateside to, among other duties, perform coastal patrols and port security.

Because all of the personnel inducted in the Coast Guard after the start of the war were reservists, only 8% of the 214,000 Coast Guardsmen that served during World War II were non-reservists. An additional 125,000 temporary reservists also contributed to the war effort. At the end of the war most reservists were released to inactive duty or discharged.

The Coastal Picket Force was administered under the auspicates of the Coast Guard Reserve.

=== Cold War period ===
Due to increased tensions during the Korean War period, Congress authorized funding of the first Coast Guard Reserve units. The first units were known as Organized Reserve Training Unit, Port Security (ORTUPS) and consisted of reserve officers and enlisted training in port security operations. Meetings were generally held once a week for 4 hours on a week night. Four hours paid the reservist the equivalent of one day's pay for active duty Coast Guardsmen. There were 35 ORTUPS Units and 8300 reservists serving by July 1951. It was during this time that the Coast Guard's Office of Reserve was created.

During the Vietnam War period and shortly thereafter, the Coast Guard considered abandoning the reserve program, but the force was instead reoriented into force augmentation. At the start of American involvement in the conflict, the Coast Guard anticipated calling up its reservists and auxilarists. As a result, 8,000 Coast Guard personnel, both active-duty and reservists, served in Southeast Asia. The Coast Guard Reserve reached its peak strength of 17,815 in 1969, during the Vietnam War.

=== Post-Vietnam War events ===
==== Mobilizations ====
In 1973 women were integrated into the active-duty Coast Guard and the Coast Guard Reserve. The SPARS ended and those in it were sent to the reserve.

Also in 1973 the reserve exercised its first involuntary recall in support of flood operations in the Midwest. The next involuntary recall was in support of the Mariel Boat Lift exodus from Cuba in 1980. Reserve units were increasingly used to augment regular Coast Guard operations during the 1980s but the mission of the Reserves was still training for mobilization. It was during this period that USCG Reserve strength greatly declined from its peak of 17,815 in 1969, as it declined to 11,500. This was partially because of administrative proposals to phase out the selected reserve.

Port Security Units (PSU) were formed during this time period and are made up of a small active duty element that handles the daily unit administration duties and a hundred or more reservists to complete the unit roster. Most of the enlisted reservists in a PSU are in the maritime enforcement specialist (ME) rating; a new rating as of 1 January 2010 that includes both active and reserve personnel. The ME rating was the old port security specialist (PS) rating, a reserve only rating that was integrated into the ME rating. Other rates assigned to the PSU's include boatswains mate (BM), machinery technician (MK), gunners mate (GM), yeoman (YN), storekeeper (SK), and health services technician (HS).

In 1990, the first PSU was called up to active duty to support Operation Desert Shield and Operation Desert Storm. Various PSU's have taken turns rotating in and out of Southwest Asia since that time.

==== Team Coast Guard ====
1994 saw the restructuring of the reserve program with the advent of the "Team Coast Guard" concept. This led to the disestablishment of most reserve units and the assignment of the reservists to active duty commands. As a result, reservists work very closely with their active duty counterparts, the Coast Guard Auxiliary, and Coast Guard civilians as they augment the resources of active duty commands. PSUs are the only remaining reserve units, as all other reservists are assigned to active duty commands.

While reservists provide high-value augmentation of active duty forces to assist in accomplishing everyday missions, each reservist must continually balance augmentation duties with readiness for mobilization. Since 11 September 2001, over 8,500 reservists have been activated.

=== Recent events ===
In 1997, a memorandum of understanding was signed between the New York Naval Militia and the U.S. Coast Guard, permitting Coast Guard reservists to serve in the New York Naval Militia, while simultaneously continuing their service in the Coast Guard Reserve.

The Commandant staff has recently developed a plan for support that "optimizes the organization, administration, recruiting, instruction, training, and readiness of the Coast Guard Reserve" known as Reserve Force Readiness System (RFRS). This program will improve the administrative and training readiness of the reserve force. The plans for improvements in funding and full-time support billets for the reserve force are being evaluated during 2009 and full implementation will be phased in over the next four years.

In 2000, the Coast Guard Reserve was deployed to the Middle East in response to the USS Cole bombing. The Coast Guard Reserve was also activated in response to the 11 September attacks and Hurricane Katrina during the early to mid 2000s.

Recent deployments of the Coast Guard Reserve include the 2010 Haiti earthquake, the Deepwater Horizon oil spill, Hurricane Sandy, Hurricane Ian, the Mexico–United States border crisis, the Golden Ray capcizing, COVID-19 Response, and the Francis Scott Key bridge collapse.

== Organization ==
The Coast Guard Reservist normally trains two days a month in a drill status and may perform up to 12 days of active duty Annual Training (AT) a year. Short of mobilization recall for war or national emergencies, opportunities exist for additional active duty under Active Duty for Training (ADT), Active Duty for Operational Support (ADOS) or Active Duty Special Work (ADSW). The Coast Guard Reserve has 6,293 men and women in service, most of them integrated directly with regular active duty Coast Guard units.

One of the significant organizational elements of the USCG Reserve are its Port Security Units, each PSU is staffed by 140 reservists and 6 active-duty personnel (one officer and 5 first-class petty officers).The officer may or may not be a reservist. Personnel prepare for contingency operations during weekend drills and normally participate in exercises and specialized training during their annual active-duty training (ADT).

There are 8 Port Security Units:

- PSU 301: Joint Base Cape Cod, Massachusetts
- PSU 305: Joint Base Langley–Eustis, Virginia
- PSU 307: Coast Guard Air Station Clearwater, Florida
- PSU 308: Stennis Space Center, Mississippi
- PSU 309: Camp Perry, Ohio
- PSU 311: Coast Guard Base Los Angeles/Long Beach, California
- PSU 312: Coast Guard Base Alameda, California
- PSU 313: Naval Station Everett, Washington

In 2021, the Coast Guard initiated a Coast Guard Reserve aviation program organized along the lines of flying units in the Reserve Components of the U.S. Department of Defense. This initially consisted of Coast Guard Reserve enlisted Naval Aircrewmen and Rescue Swimmers in pay grades E-4 through E-6 who would augment their active duty counterparts at Coast Guard air stations and air facilities. These personnel were typically eligible to perform four to six days of drills per month and additional active duty days annually.

In 2022, this program was expanded to commissioned officers of the Coast Guard Reserve who were aeronautically designated as Coast Guard Aviators (i.e., pilots) who would serve in one of three capacities:

- Detached Duty External (DDE) flight instructors assigned to the Naval Air Training Command under the Chief of Naval Air Training (CNATRA). These officers would serve as primary and intermediate flight instructors in the T-6B Texan II at NAS Whiting Field, Florida and NAS Corpus Christi, Texas; as advanced multiengine fixed-wing flight instructors in the T-44A/C Pegasus and T-54A Marlin II at NAS Corpus Christi; and as advanced rotary-wing flight instructors in the TH-57B/C Sea Ranger and TH-73A Thrasher at NAS Whiting Field.
- Aviation Training Center Mobile Reserve Standarization Instruction Pilots assigned to U.S. Coast Guard Aviation Training Center Mobile, the Coast Guard's advanced training facility for all the service's fleet aircraft except for the HC-130J Hercules. ATC Mobile is located at Mobile Regional Airport, Alabama, a joint civil-military airport.
- Coast Guard Reserve Aviator assigned directly to Coast Guard air stations and air facilities, flying the aircraft assigned to those installations. These pilots will perform all standard USCG aviation mission sets, to include standing 24-hour alert duty and meeting all training and flight proficiency requirements, equating to approximately sixty to seventy-two drill days plus additional active duty AT, ADT, or ADOS periods annually.

== See also ==
- SPARS
- Women in the United States Coast Guard
- Port Security Unit
- Army National Guard (U.S. Army)
- United States Army Reserve
- United States Marine Corps Reserve
- United States Navy Reserve
- Air National Guard (U.S. Air Force)
- Air Force Reserve Command (U.S. Air Force)
- Master Chief Petty Officer of the Coast Guard Reserve Force

== Notes ==
Footnotes

Citations

References

- "History of the Coast Guard Reserve" (asp). Coast Guard History. U.S. Coast Guard Historian's Office.
- "Leadership" (asp). United States Coast Guard Reserve. U.S. Coast Guard.
- Bullock, Darren (2009). "RFRS: Reserve Force Readiness System, the Blueprint for a 21st Century Reserve" (PDF). Coast Guard Reservist. U.S. Coast Guard.
- Johnson, Robert Erwin (1987). Guardians of the Sea, History of the United States Coast Guard, 1915 to the Present. Naval Institute Press, Annapolis, Maryland. ISBN 978-0-87021-720-3.
- O'Donnell, Patrick (2009). "PS to ME Rating Lateral Process" (PDF). Coast Guard Reservist. U.S. Coast Guard.
- Schultz, Karl. "U.S. Coast Guard Reserve Policy Statement" (PDF). Commandant's Reserve Policy Statement. U.S. Coast Guard.
- Stosz, Sandra (January–February 2011). "From quick response to new horizons: 2010 events emphasized the importance of the Coast Guard Reserve and served as a foundation to build a stronger future force". Officer. Vol. 87, no. 1. Reserve Officers Association. Archived from the original on 26 April 2011.
