= Alfred Stanford =

American novelist

Alfred Boiler Stanford (East Orange, New Jersey, March 12, 1900 – February 8, 1985), Commander USNR, was an American naval officer and author; he was Deputy Commander of Mulberry A in the D-day landings. For his military service he received the Bronze Star, the Legion of Merit, and the Croix de Guerre.

He published his first novel The Ground Swell while attending Amherst College. His college attendance was interrupted by service in the Navy. After graduating, he worked in the advertising industry, published several more works of fiction and non-fiction, and eventually re-entered military service during World War II. He was later the vice president of the New York Herald Tribune and publisher of the Milford Citizen, a newspaper in Milford, Connecticut.

== Books ==
- The Ground Swell (Appleton, 1923)
- A City Out of the Sea (Appleton, 1924)
- Navigator: The Story of Nathaniel Bowditch of Salem (William Morrow, 1928)
- Invitation to Danger (William Morrow, 1929)
- Flag in the Wind (William Morrow, 1930)
- Men, Fish & Boats (William Morrow, 1934)
- Pleasures of Sailing (Simon & Schuster, 1943)
- Force Mulberry: The Planning and Installation of the Artificial Harbor off U. S. Normandy Beaches in World War II (William Morrow, 1951)
- Boatman's Handbook: Ninety-six Jobs You Can Do on Your Own Boat (Motorboat Publications, 1957)
- Far Horizons: Adventures in Cruising by Members of the Cruising Club of America, edited by Alfred Stanford, David L. Bacon, and Charles H. Vilas (Cruising Club of America, 1971)
