= Thomas D. Kinley =

US Army major general

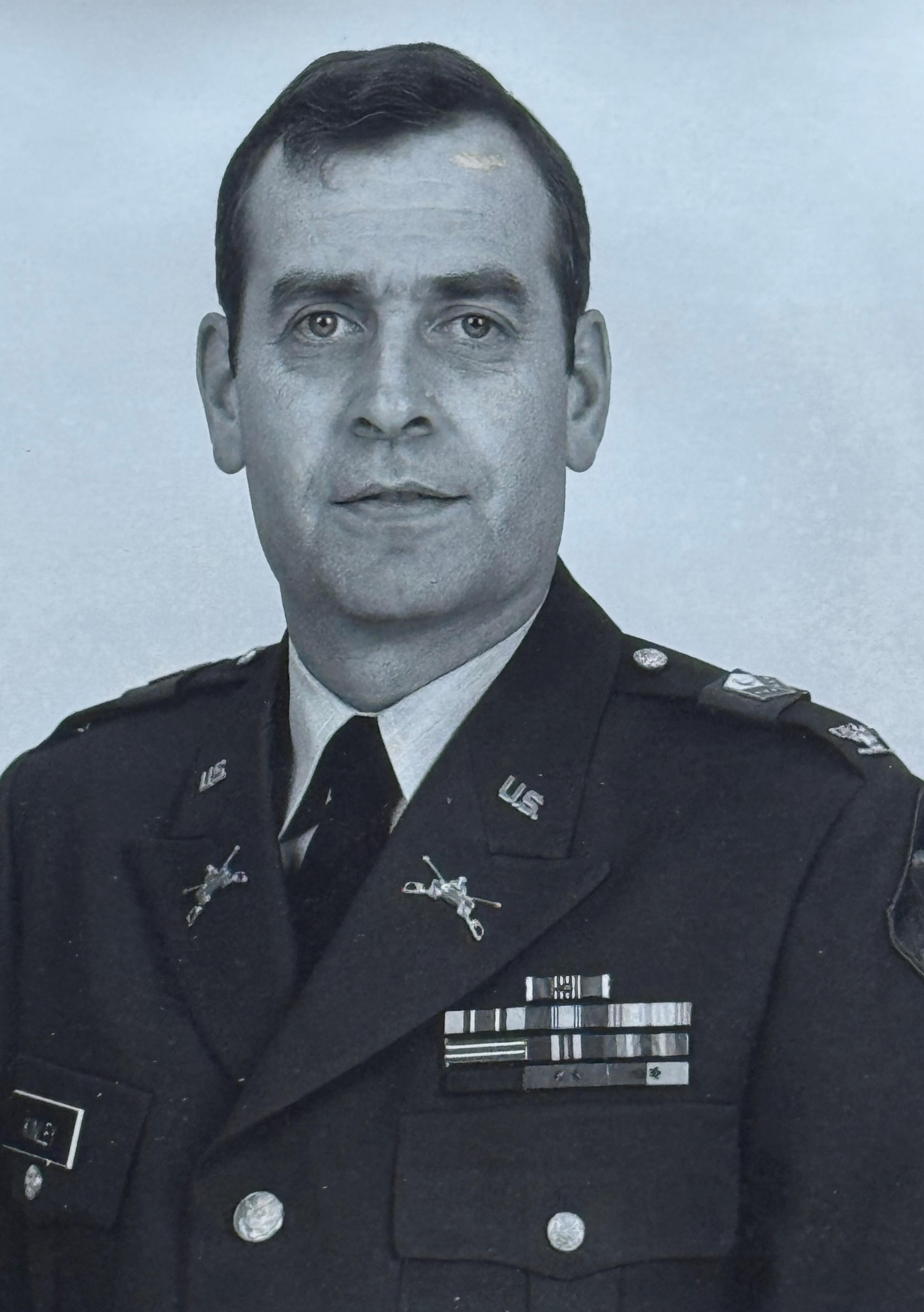
- Kinley as commander of the 86th Armored Brigade, c. 1990
- Born: June 14, 1945 (age 81); Albany, New York, US
- Alma mater: Hudson Valley Community College; Excelsior University; United States Army War College
- Spouse(s): Mary Theresa La Frank (m. 1967–1979) Anne E. Goodrich (m. 1980)
- Children: 5
- Military career
- Service: United States Army
- Service years: 1966–1999
- Rank: Major General
- Units: New York Army National Guard; Vermont Army National Guard
- Commands: 42nd Infantry Division; 86th Armored Brigade; 2nd Battalion, 172nd Armor; Troop C, 5th Squadron, 117th Cavalry
- Conflicts: Cold War
- Awards: Legion of Merit; Meritorious Service Medal (3); Army Commendation Medal (3)
- Other work: President and chief executive officer, Northern New England AAA

Thomas D. Kinley (born June 14, 1945) is a retired business executive and Army National Guard officer. He served in the Army National Guard from 1966 to 1999, and attained the rank of major general as commander of the 42nd Infantry Division.

A native of Albany, New York, Kinley graduated from Albany's Vincentian Institute and Troy's Hudson Valley Community College. Kinley's civilian career was with AAA offices with responsibility for customers in Albany, Vermont, and Northern New England, and he rose through the managerial and executive ranks to become Northern New England AAA's president and chief executive officer.

Kinley enlisted in the National Guard in 1966 and received his commission as a second lieutenant in 1968. Kinley served in New York and Vermont as he advanced through staff and command positions including command of: Troop C, 5th Squadron, 117th Cavalry; 2nd Battalion, 172nd Armor; and the 86th Armored Brigade. He graduated from Excelsior University in 1987 and the United States Army War College in 1995. From 1996 to 1999, he was commander of the 42nd Infantry Division. Kinley retired in September 1999, and his awards included the Legion of Merit.

In retirement, Kinley resided in Waterbury Center, Vermont and his civic activities included service on the town of Waterbury's development review board.

== Early life ==
Thomas Daniel Kinley was born in Albany, New York on June 14, 1945, the son of Raymond J. Kinley and Vivian A. (Smith) Kinley. He graduated from Albany's Vincentian Institute, then attended Hudson Valley Community College, from which he graduated in 1966 with an Associate of Applied Science (AAS) degree in business administration.

== Start of career ==
=== Civilian career ===
Kinley began his civilian career as an employee of the Albany-area American Automobile Association (AAA). He continued to work for AAA in management and executive positions with AAA of Vermont, and later the Maine-based AAA of Northern New England. Kinley was appointed president and chief executive officer of Northern New England AAA in 2001, and held this position until retiring in 2012.

=== Military career ===
In 1966, Kinley enlisted in the New York Army National Guard, and he served during the middle and end portions of the Cold War until retiring in 1999. He completed his initial training, then began attendance at Officer Candidate School. In 1968, he received his commission as a second lieutenant in the Signal Corps. From August 1968 to June 1969, he was a communications officer assigned to the New York National Guard's State Area Command (STARC) in Albany. From June 1969 to August 1974, he served as communications officer on the headquarters staff of Vermont's 86th Infantry Brigade Combat Team in Berlin, Vermont. Kinley received promotion to first lieutenant in August 1971. He was assigned as platoon leader of the 86th Brigade's Headquarters Company's communications platoon from August 1974 to February 1975.

Kinley served as an Armor platoon leader with Company A, 2nd Battalion, 172nd Armor in Bradford, Vermont from February 1975 to June 1975. He was next assigned to the executive officer's position with Troop C, 5th Squadron, 117th Cavalry in Lyndonville, Vermont, where he served from July 1975 to August 1975. Kinley was promoted to captain in August 1975 and assigned to command of Troop C, which he led until October 1977.

== Continued military career ==
From October 1977 to September 1978, Kinley served as Intelligence staff officer (S2) for 2nd Battalion, 172nd Armor in Rutland, Vermont. He was then appointed as the battalion's Logistics staff officer (S4), and he held this post from September 1978 to October 1979. From November 1979 to August 1982, he served as 2nd Battalion's Plans, Operations, and Training staff officer (S3), and he received promotion to major in February 1980.

From August to November 1982, Kinley served as executive officer of 2nd Battalion, 172nd Armor. He was the 86th Armored Brigade's S3 from December 1982 to August 1983. He commanded 2nd Battalion, 172nd Armor from August 1983 to September 1986, and he was promoted to lieutenant colonel in April 1984. From September 1986 to June 1988, Kinley was the 86th Armored Brigade's executive officer. In 1987, Kinley received his bachelor of arts degree in liberal arts from New York's Regents College (now Excelsior University). He commanded the 86th Armored Brigade from June 1988 to September 1993, and he received his promotion to colonel in July 1988.

== Career as general officer ==
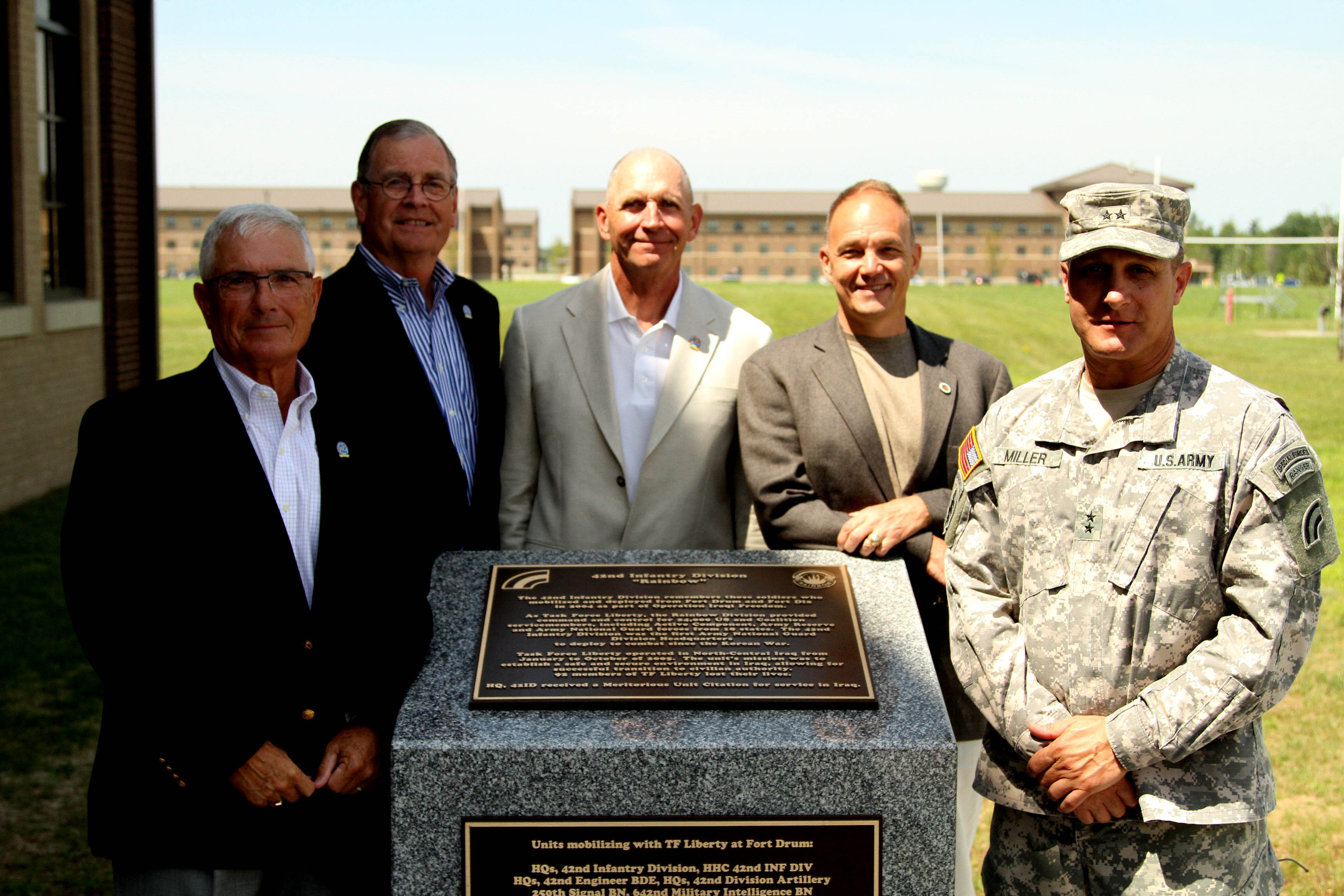
2014 photo of 42nd Infantry Division Major General Harry E. Miller Jr. (far right) with previous division commanders (l to r): Joseph J. Taluto, Kinley, Paul Genereux, and Steven N. Wickstrom

In September 1993, Kinley was selected for assignment as assistant adjutant general for army at Vermont's State Area Command in Colchester, Vermont. In 1995, he graduated from the United States Army War College, and in July of that year he received promotion to brigadier general. In September 1995, Kinley was assigned as assistant division commander for maneuver at the 42nd Infantry Division's headquarters in Troy, New York. In October 1996, Kinley was selected to command the 42nd Infantry Division, and he was promoted to major general in July 1997. He continued in this post until September 1999, when he was succeeded by George T. Garrett and retired.

== Awards ==
Kinley's awards include:

- Legion of Merit
- Meritorious Service Medal with two bronze oak leaf clusters
- Army Commendation Medal with two bronze oak leaf clusters
- Army Reserve Components Achievement Medal with one silver oak leaf cluster
- National Defense Service Medal
- Armed Forces Reserve Medal with gold hourglass device
- Army Service Ribbon
- Army Reserve Components Overseas Training Ribbon

== Promotions ==
The effective dates of Kinley's promotions were:

- Major General, July 1, 1997
- Brigadier General, July 27, 1995
- Colonel, July 7, 1988
- Lieutenant Colonel, April 10, 1984
- Major, February 25, 1980
- Captain, August 22, 1975
- First Lieutenant, August 15, 1971
- Second Lieutenant, August 16, 1968

== Later life ==
While employed by AAA, Kinley resided in Barre and Montpelier, Vermont, and in Cape Elizabeth, Maine. After retiring from AAA, he resided in Waterbury Center, Vermont. Among his activities after returning to Vermont was service on the town of Waterbury's development review board.

== Family ==
In 1967, Kinley married Mary Theresa La Frank of Albany. They divorced in 1979 and are the parents of four children. In 1980, he married Anne E. Goodrich of Vermont.
