= Jason M. Vanderhaden =

13th Master Chief Petty Officer of the Coast Guard

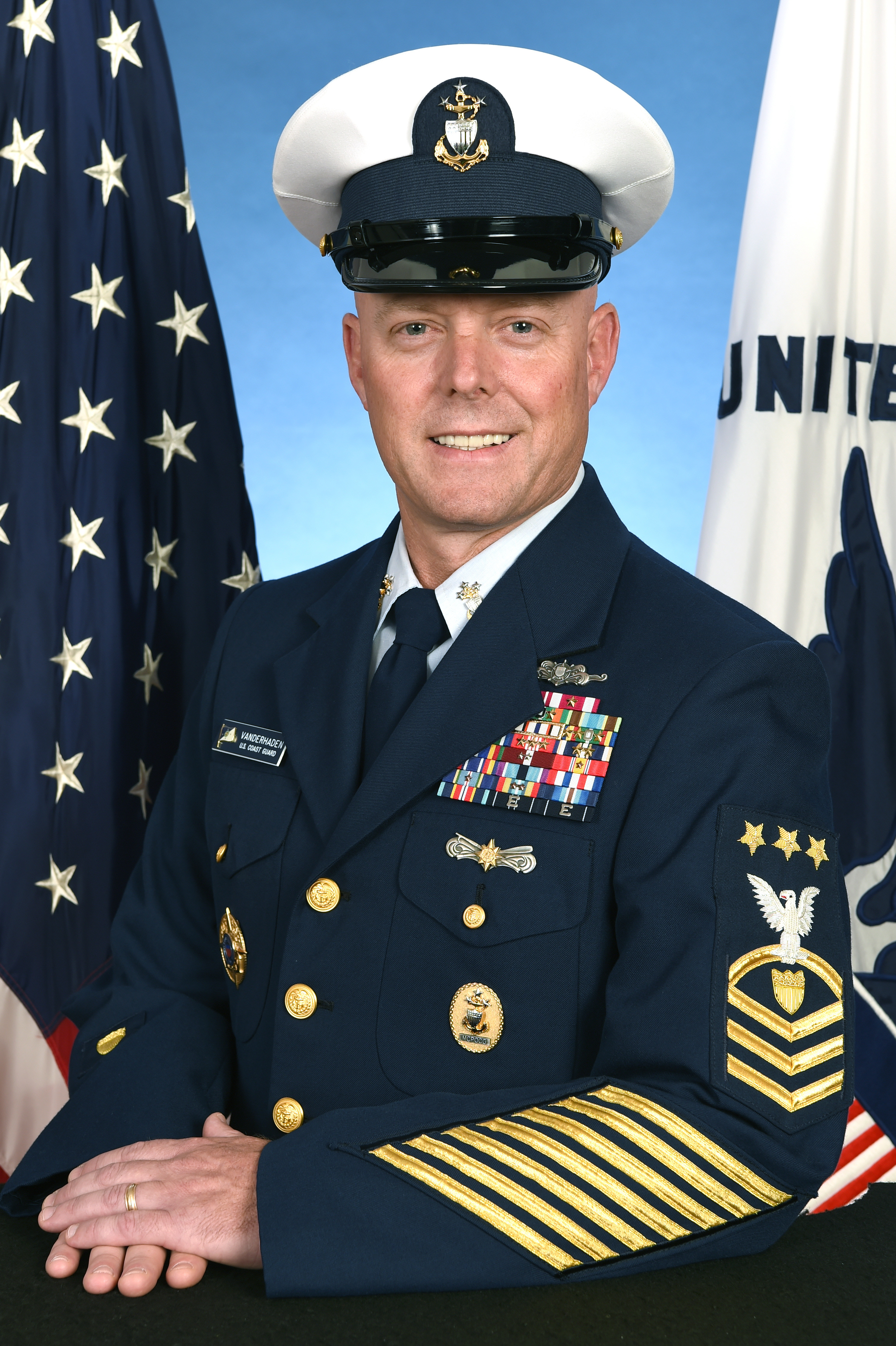
- Official portrait, 2018
- Born: Tallahassee, Florida, U.S.
- Alma mater: Excelsior University (BS)
- Military career
- Allegiance: United States
- Branch: United States Coast Guard
- Service years: 1988–2022
- Rank: Master Chief Petty Officer of the Coast Guard
- Awards: Coast Guard Distinguished Service Medal; Legion of Merit; Meritorious Service Medal (2); Coast Guard Commendation Medal (3); Coast Guard Achievement Medal (4)

Jason M. Vanderhaden is a retired Master Chief Petty Officer of the United States Coast Guard who served as the 13th Master Chief Petty Officer of the Coast Guard from May 17, 2018 to May 19, 2022. As MCPOCG, Vanderhaden served as the principal advisor to the Commandant of the Coast Guard on all enlisted personnel matters. As a matter of protocol, this gave him precedence equal to that of a three-star officer (vice admiral).

== Assignments ==
Since enlisting in the Coast Guard in May 1988, MCPOCG Vanderhaden has served in a number of positions, including:

- Command Master Chief, Deputy Commandant for Mission Support (DCMS), Washington, DC
- Command Master Chief, Pacific Area, Alameda, CA
- Command Master Chief, 13th Coast Guard District, Seattle, WA
- Command Master Chief, Coast Guard Base Honolulu, Honolulu, HI
- Instructor, Chief Petty Officer Academy, Petaluma, CA
- USCGC Reliance, Portsmouth, NH
- Coast Guard Station Ponce de Leon Inlet, New Smyrna Beach, FL
- USCGC Active, Port Angeles, WA
- Air Station Humboldt Bay, McKinleyville, CA
- USCGC CHEYENNE, St. Louis, MO
- Air Station Clearwater, Clearwater, FL
- Coast Guard Loran Station Iwo Jima
- Coast Guard Food Service Specialist "A" School, Petaluma, CA
- Coast Guard Station Jones Beach, Freeport, NY
- Coast Guard Recruit Basic Training, Cape May, NJ

== Education ==
Vanderhaden is a graduate of Class 114 of the Coast Guard Chief Petty Officer Academy, the National Defense University’s Keystone Command Joint Senior Enlisted Leader Course, the Harvard Kennedy School Leadership in Homeland Security Course and other service-related schools. Vanderhaden holds a Bachelor of Science from Excelsior University. Vanderhaden is also a graduate of the International Academy of Gourmet Chefs where he was honored to be Valedictorian of the graduating class of 2018.

== Family ==
Vanderhaden and his wife have two adult children who are both currently serving in the United States Coast Guard.

== Awards and decorations ==
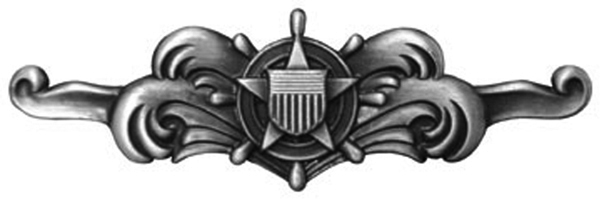

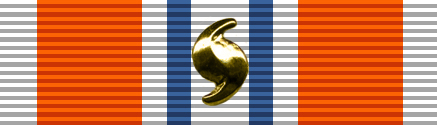

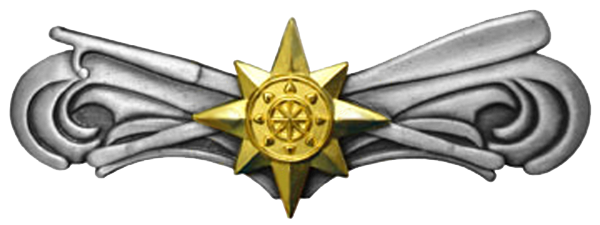

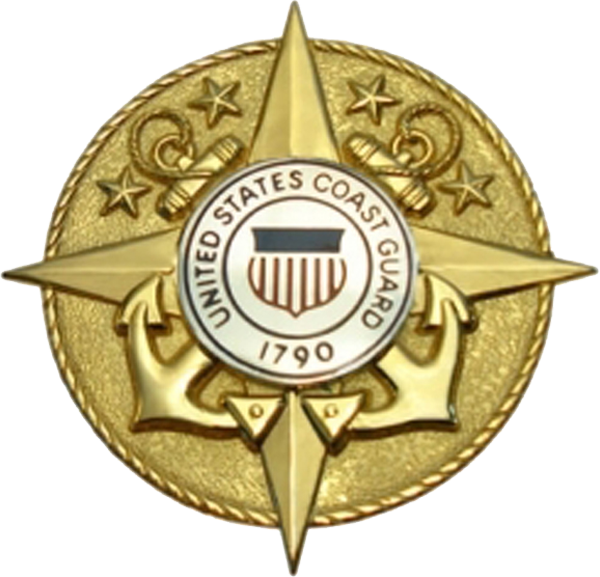
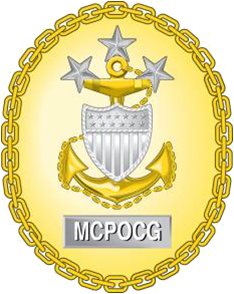

Insignia	Enlisted Cutterman Insignia (permanent)		
1st row	Coast Guard Distinguished Service Medal		
2nd row	Legion of Merit	Meritorious Service Medal with one gold award star	Coast Guard Commendation Medal with two gold award stars and "O" device
3rd row	Coast Guard Achievement Medal with three gold award stars and "O" device	Commandant's Letter of Commendation Ribbon	Coast Guard Presidential Unit Citation with hurricane device
4th row	Department of Homeland Security Outstanding Unit Award	Secretary of Transportation Outstanding Unit Award	Coast Guard Unit Commendation with three gold award stars and "O" device
5th row	Coast Guard Meritorious Unit Commendation with three gold award stars and "O" device	Meritorious Team Commendation with three gold award stars	Coast Guard "E" Ribbon with two gold award stars
6th row	Coast Guard Bicentennial Unit Commendation	Coast Guard Good Conduct Medal with two silver service stars	National Defense Service Medal with one bronze service star
7th row	Global War on Terrorism Service Medal	Humanitarian Service Medal	Transportation 9-11 Ribbon
8th row	Special Operations Service Ribbon with one service star	Sea Service Ribbon with two service stars	Restricted Duty Ribbon
9th row	Overseas Service Ribbon	Rifle Marksmanship Medal with expert device	Pistol Marksmanship Medal with expert device
Insignia	Advanced Boat Force Operations Insignia		
Badge	Commandant Staff Badge		Master Chief Petty Officer of the Coast Guard Badge

- 8 gold service stripes.

Military offices
Preceded by Steven W. Cantrell	Master Chief Petty Officer of the Coast Guard; 2018–2022	Succeeded by Heath B. Jones
