= ECE =

Ece or ECE may refer to

- Ece, a Turkish given name and surname
- Early childhood education
- East Coast Expressway, an interstate turnpike spanning across the east coast of Peninsular Malaysia
- Educational Credential Evaluators
- Einstein–Cartan–Evans theory
- Excelsior College Examinations, an American standardized test
- Explicit Congestion Notification Echo
- Economic Commission for Europe, United Nations body concerned with safety standards
- EuroCity-Express, a category of trains
- Edge Consumer Electronics, networks of interconnected Consumer Electronics devices
- Electrical and computer engineering
  - Electrical engineering
  - Computer engineering
