= Michael Leavitt =

Mike or Michael Leavitt may refer to:

- Michael B. Leavitt (1843–1935), American theater entrepreneur, manager and producer
- Mike Leavitt (born 1951), American governor of Utah
- Michael P. Leavitt (born 1960), American Coast Guard Master Chief Petty Officer
- Michael Leavitt (artist) (born 1977), American visual artist, a/k/a Mike Leavitt

== See also ==
- Michael Levitt (disambiguation)
