= Heath B. Jones =

14th Master Chief Petty Officer of the Coast Guard

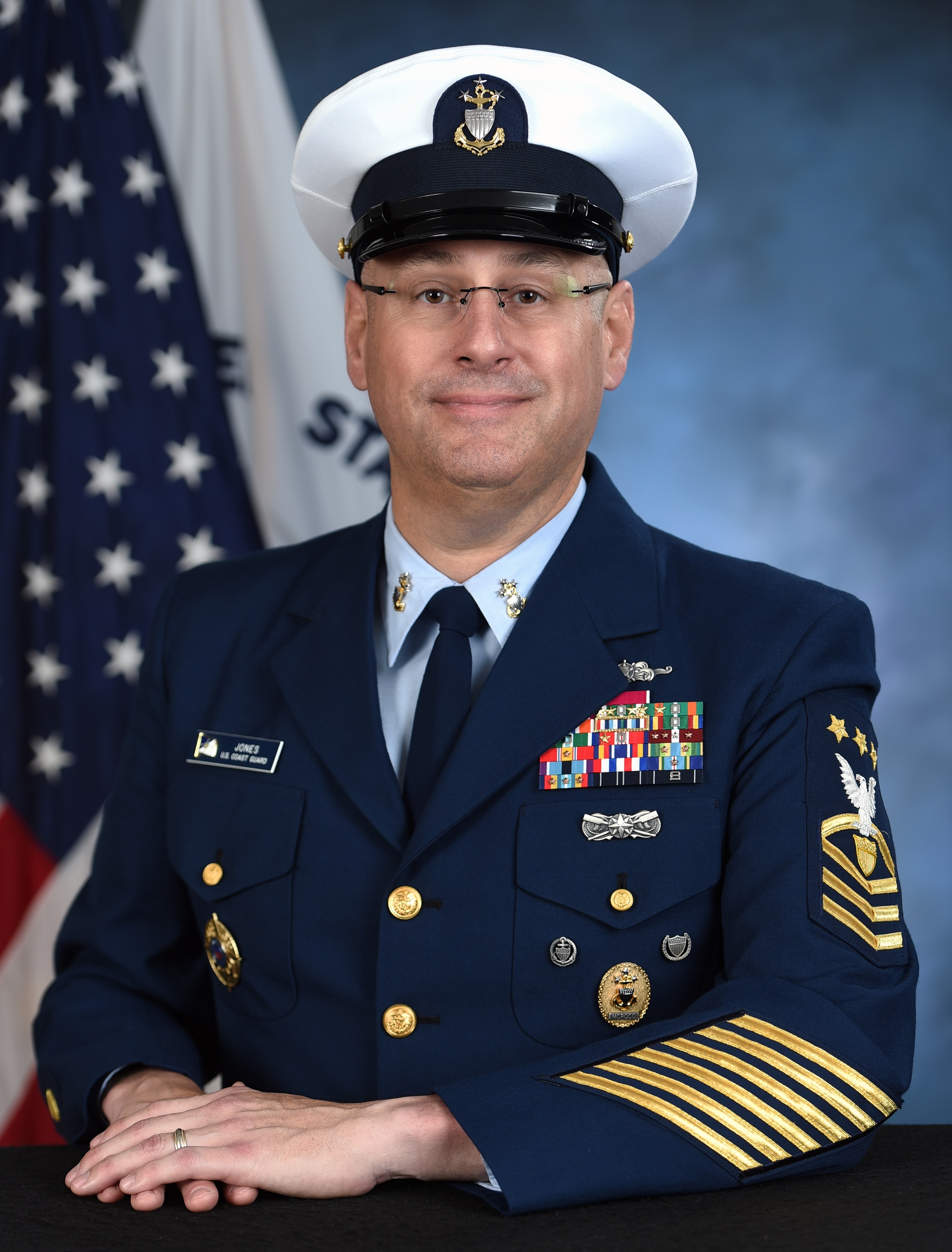
- Official portrait, 2022
- Born: Covington, Louisiana, U.S.
- Military career
- Allegiance: United States of America
- Branch: United States Coast Guard
- Service years: 1995–2025
- Rank: Master Chief Petty Officer of the Coast Guard
- Commands: Master Chief Petty Officer of the Coast Guard; Deputy Commandant for Mission Support (DCMS); Command Master Chief of Coast Guard Pacific Area
- Awards: Legion of Merit; Meritorious Service Medal (4) with "O" device Coast Guard Commendation Medal (5) with "O" device Coast Guard Achievement Medal (2) with "O" device

Heath B. Jones is a United States Coast Guard serviceman who served as the 14th Master Chief Petty Officer of the Coast Guard from 2022 to 2025. He served as the principal advisor to the Commandant of the Coast Guard on all enlisted personnel matters. As a matter of protocol, this gave him precedence equal to that of a three-star officer (vice admiral).

== Education ==
Jones is a graduate of Class 124 of the Coast Guard Chief Petty Officers Academy, the Coast Guard Senior Enlisted Leadership Course class 48, and the National Defense University's Senior Enlisted Professional Military Education course. He holds both a Bachelor and a Master of Arts Degree in Organizational Management with a specialty in Human Resource Management. He also holds a Certificate of Apprenticeship as a Master Homeland Security Specialist from the United Services Military Apprenticeship Program.

== Assignments ==
After enlisting in the Coast Guard in May 1995, CMC Jones served in a number of positions, including:

- Command Master Chief, Deputy Commandant for Mission Support (DCMS), Washington, D.C.
- Command Master Chief of Coast Guard Pacific Area
- Command Master Chief for the 8th Coast Guard District
- Command Master Chief of Coast Guard Sector Hampton Roads, Portsmouth, Virginia
- First Lieutenant of Station New Orleans and Coast Guard Cutter Kanawha
- Executive Petty Officer of Station Little Creek and Coast Guard Cutter Seahawk
- Coast Guard Station Cape Charles, Virginia
- Coast Guard Cutter Bollard
- Coast Guard Station Pensacola, Florida
- Officer in Charge of Coast Guard Cutter Sea Horse

== Family ==
Jones has been married to the former Carol Ann Clarke of Folsom, Louisiana since 1996. They are the parents of son Christian, attending graduate school at the University of New Orleans, and daughter Sidney, attending Louisiana State University Medical School in New Orleans.

== Awards and decorations ==
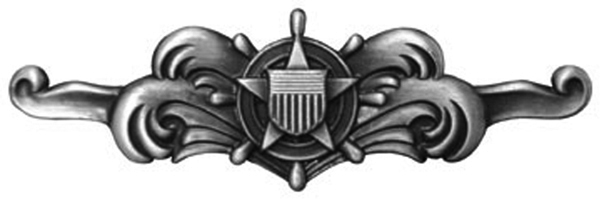

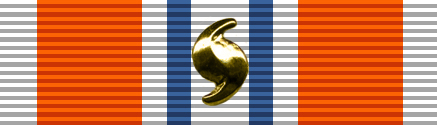

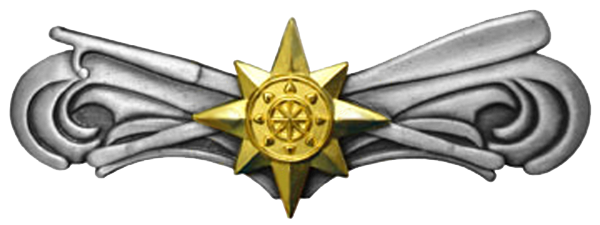

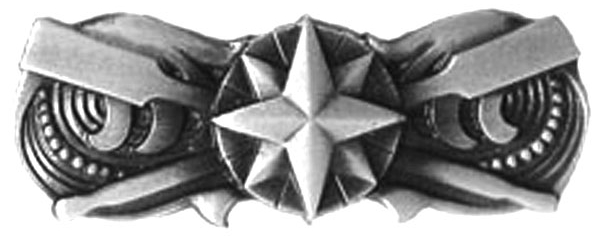

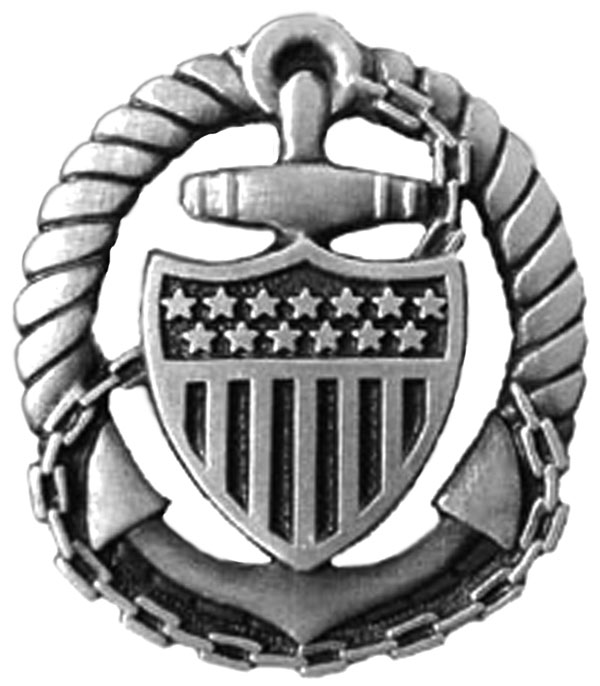
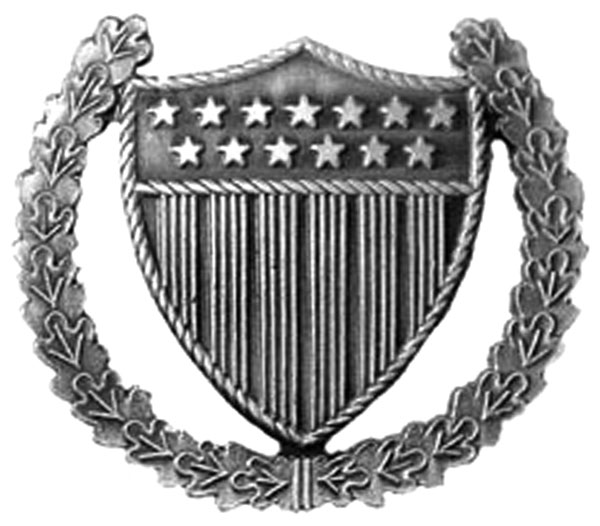

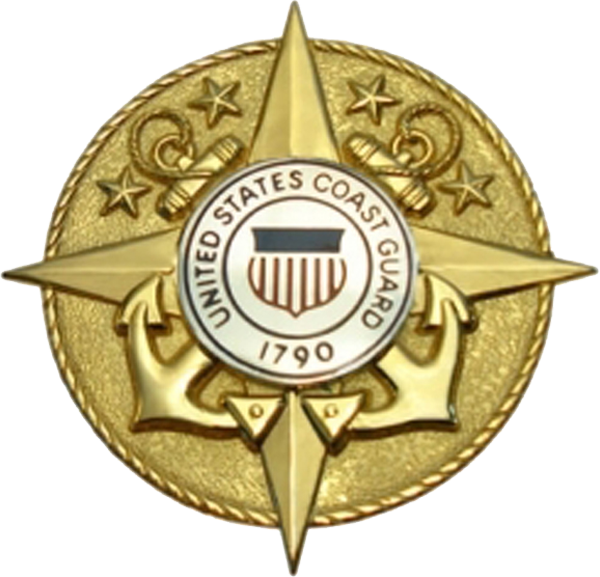
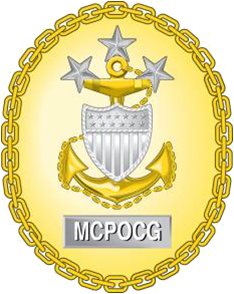

| Insignia | Enlisted Cutterman Insignia (permanent) | | |
| 1st row | Legion of Merit | | |
| 2nd row | Meritorious Service Medal with "O" device and three gold award stars | Coast Guard Commendation Medal with four award stars and "O" device | Coast Guard Achievement Medal with award star and "O" device |
| 3rd row | Coast Guard Presidential Unit Citation with hurricane device | Department of Homeland Security Outstanding Unit Award | Coast Guard Unit Commendation with "O" device |
| 4th row | Coast Guard Meritorious Unit Commendation with award star and "O" device | Meritorious Team Commendation with award star and "O" device | Coast Guard Good Conduct Medal with one silver and three bronze service stars |
| 5th row | National Defense Service Medal with one bronze service star | Global War on Terrorism Service Medal | Armed Forces Service Medal with two service stars |
| 6th row | Humanitarian Service Medal | Transportation 9-11 Ribbon | Special Operations Service Ribbon with service star |
| 7th row | Sea Service Ribbon with three service stars | Rifle Marksmanship Ribbon | Pistol Marksmanship Ribbon with Sharpshooter device |
| Insignia | Advanced Boat Force Operations Insignia | | |
| Insignia | Coxswain Insignia | | |
| Insignias | Officer-in-Charge Afloat Pin | | Officer-in-Charge Ashore Pin |
| Badges | Commandant Staff Badge | | Master Chief Petty Officer of the Coast Guard Identification Badge |

- 6 gold service stripes.
- Jones is also the recipient of the 2012 Signalman First Class Douglas Munro Inspirational Leadership Award and the 2006 Master Chief Petty Officer Angela McShan Inspirational Leadership Award.

Military offices
| Preceded by Jason M. Vanderhaden | Master Chief Petty Officer of the Coast Guard; 2022–2025 | Succeeded by Phillip N. Waldron |
