= Steven W. Cantrell =

12th Master Chief Petty Officer of the Coast Guard

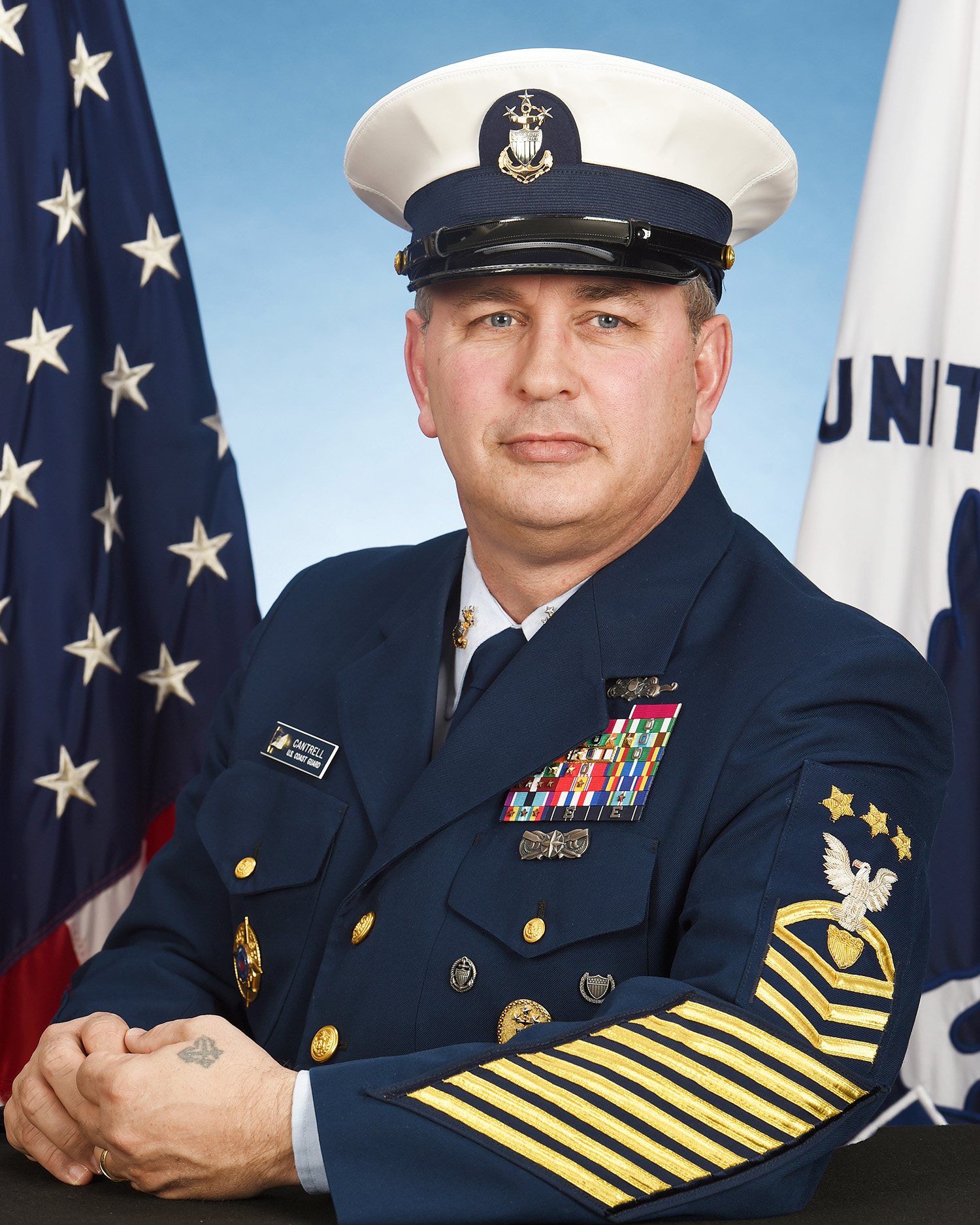
- Military career
- Allegiance: United States of America
- Branch: United States Coast Guard
- Service years: 1983–2018
- Rank: Master Chief Petty Officer of the Coast Guard
- Awards: Coast Guard Distinguished Service Medal; Legion of Merit; Meritorious Service Medal (2)

Steven W. Cantrell previously served as the 12th Master Chief Petty Officer of the Coast Guard. He was relieved, and retired from active duty on May 17, 2018, after nearly 35 years of service. Prior to being named the 12th MCPOCG, he was Command Master Chief of the Coast Guard's Atlantic Area, based in Portsmouth, Virginia. Cantrell was also the Coast Guard's 12th Silver Ancient Mariner, an honor bestowed upon the enlisted member holding the enlisted cutterman qualification the earliest. Cantrell was succeeded by MCPOCG Jason M. Vanderhaden.

== Assignments ==
After enlisting in the Coast Guard in 1983, Cantrell served in a number of positions, including:

- Command Master Chief of Atlantic Area, Portsmouth, Virginia
- Senior Enlisted Advisor to the Vice Commandant of the Coast Guard
- Command Master Chief of the Eighth Coast Guard District, New Orleans, Louisiana
- Officer in Charge, Station Panama City Beach, Florida
- Command Master Chief of the First Coast Guard District, Boston, Massachusetts
- Officer in Charge, Station Wrightsville Beach, North Carolina
- Officer in Charge, Station Alexandria Bay, New York
- Officer in Charge, Station Harbor Beach, Michigan
- Operations Petty Officer, Station Barnegat Light, New Jersey
- Officer in Charge, Coast Guard Cutters Ridley and Point Wells, Montauk, New York
- Executive Petty Officer, Coast Guard Cutter Point Camden, Santa Barbara, California
- Coast Guard Cutter Confidence, Port Canaveral, Florida
- Coast Guard Cutter Patoka, Greenville, Mississippi
- Coast Guard Cutter Rambler, Charleston, South Carolina

== Education ==
MCPOCG Cantrell holds a Bachelor of Science and a Master of Science in Business Administration. Among numerous service schools, he attend and was a graduate of Class 45 at the Coast Guard Chief Petty Officer Academy and National Defense University's Keystone Joint Senior Enlisted Leader Course.

== Awards and decorations ==
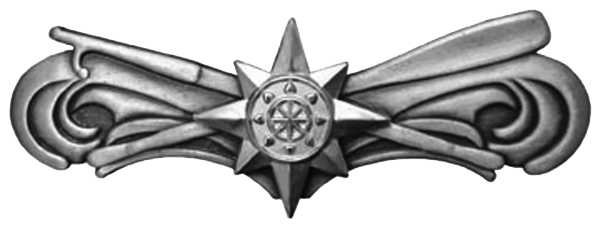
- Basic Boat Force Operations Insignia
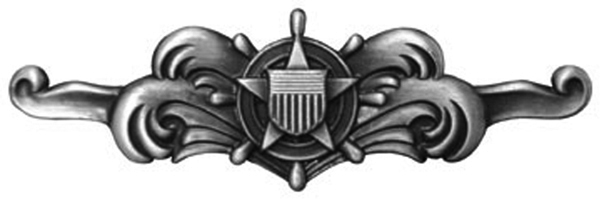
- Enlisted Cutterman Insignia (permanent)
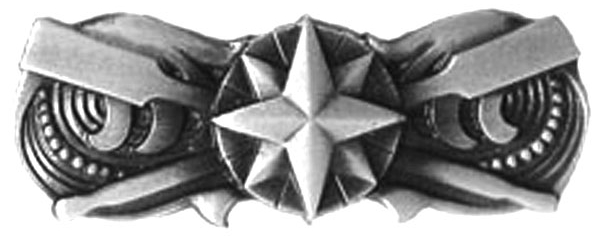
- Coxswain Insignia
- Officer-in-Charge Afloat Pin
- Officer-in-Charge Ashore Pin
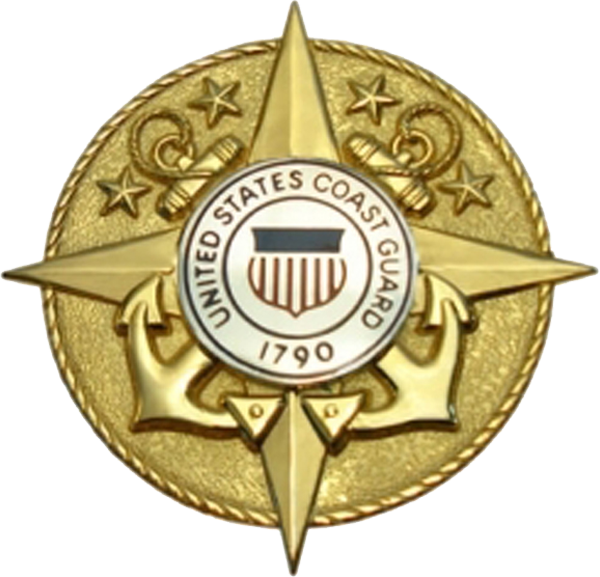
- Commandant Staff Badge
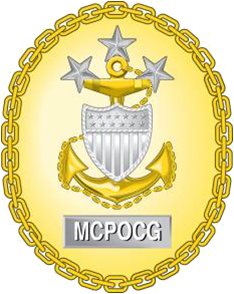
- Master Chief Petty Officer of the Coast Guard Badge

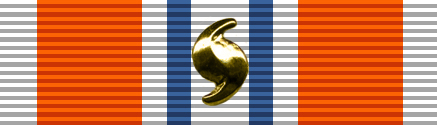
Coast Guard Distinguished Service Medal
Legion of Merit
Meritorious Service Medal with one gold award star
Coast Guard Commendation Medal with "O" device
Coast Guard Achievement Medal with one silver and two gold award stars and "O" device
Commandant's Letter of Commendation with one gold award star and "O" device
Coast Guard Presidential Unit Citation with "hurricane" device
Secretary of Transportation Outstanding Unit Award with one gold award star and "O" device
Coast Guard Unit Commendation with "O" device
Coast Guard Meritorious Unit Commendation with two gold award stars and "O" device
Meritorious Team Commendation with one gold award star and "O" device
Coast Guard Bicentennial Unit Commendation
Coast Guard Good Conduct Medal with one silver and three bronze service stars
National Defense Service Medal with one bronze service star
Global War on Terrorism Service Medal
Humanitarian Service Medal
Transportation 9-11 Ribbon
Special Operations Service Ribbon with 1 bronze service star
Sea Service Ribbon with 3 bronze service stars
Expert Rifle Marksmanship Medal
Expert Pistol Marksmanship Medal

- 8 gold Service Stripes.

Military offices
Preceded by Michael P. Leavitt	Master Chief Petty Officer of the Coast Guard; 2014–2018	Succeeded by Jason M. Vanderhaden
