= Anthony Munroe =

American businessman

Anthony E. Munroe
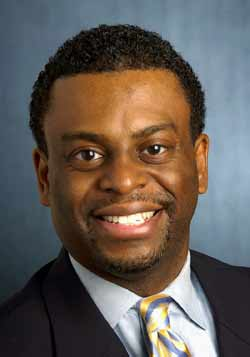
- Born: Bronx, New York
- Occupation(s): CEO of The Munroe Management Group, LLC
- Website: Official website

Anthony E. Munroe is the president of Borough of Manhattan Community College (BMCC). He previously served as President of Essex County College, and the chairman and CEO of The Munroe Management Group, LLC, a healthcare management and leadership consulting practice. He most recently served as president of Advocate Trinity Hospital . On June 29, the City University of New York approved Munroe as President of Borough of Manhattan Community College effective October 1, 2020. He began his duties a month early on September 1.

== Education ==
Munroe was reared in the Bronx, New York. Munroe completed his doctoral studies earning an Ed.D. in health education at Teachers College, Columbia University, in New York City. He holds a Master of Business Administration from Northwestern University's Kellogg Graduate School of Management and a Master of Public Health from Columbia University. His undergraduate degree is from Regents College of the University of the State of New York (now Excelsior University).
