= Study South Africa =

- Publications Committee Chair and Editor: Orla Quinlan
- Former editors: Nico Jooste
- Categories: Education, Internationalization
- Frequency: Annual
- Format: A4
- Publisher: International Education Association of South Africa (IEASA) in association with Universities South Africa (USAf)
- Founded: 2001
- Country: South Africa
- Language: English

Study South Africa is an annual publication of the International Education Association of South Africa (IEASA) in association with Universities South Africa (USAf), and serves as a guide to higher education in South Africa. Study South Africa is also known as Study South Africa: the guide to South African Higher Education.

== Scope ==
The monograph series includes articles pertaining to internationalization within the Higher Education environment of South Africa. Each monograph in the series is themed e.g. the 2018 issue was themed Advancing internationalisation in an era of transformation

== Editors ==
- 2001–2003: Andy Mason
- 2004-2004: Alexandra van Essche
- 2005–2008: Roshen Kishun
- 2009–2016: Nico Jooste
- 2017-current: Orla Quinlan
