= Michael Levitt =

Michael Levitt may refer to:

- Michael Levitt (biophysicist) (born 1947), American-British-Israeli biophysicist
- Michael Levitt (producer) (born 1968), American television producer
- Michael Levitt (politician) (born 1970), Canadian member of parliament for York Centre
- Michael Levitt (cricketer) (born 2003), Dutch cricketer
- Michael Levitt (neurosurgeon) (born 1980), American Neurosurgeon

== See also ==
- Michael Leavitt (disambiguation)
