= Michelle van Ryn =

American researcher and academic

- Education: University of Michigan; Excelsior University
- Scientific career
- Workplaces: Oregon Health & Science University; Mayo Clinic
- Thesis: The role of experimentally manipulated self-efficacy in determining job search behavior among the unemployed (1990)

Michelle van Ryn is an American health researcher who is the Grace Phelps Distinguished Professor at the Oregon Health & Science University. Her research considers the social determinants of health and equity in healthcare. She demonstrated that physicians' perceptions of patients was impacted by their socio-demographic status. She is the founder of Diversity Sciences, a consultancy company who provide evidence-based training for organizations looking to eliminate bias.

== Early life and education ==
Van Ryn was an undergraduate at the University of the State of New York, Regents College (now Excelsior University). She moved to the University of Michigan for her graduate studies, joining the School of Public Health. She stayed at Michigan for her doctoral research, which looked at how manipulating the self-efficacy of unemployed people impacted their job searching behavior.

== Research and career ==
Van Ryn joined the faculty at the University of Minnesota. She was based in the Center for Chronic Disease Outcomes Research, where she investigated disparities in healthcare. She spent thirteen years in Minnesota before moving to the Mayo Clinic. She served as Professor of Health Services Research at the Mayo, where she led a program on Equity and Inclusion in healthcare. In 201,7 van Ryn moved to Oregon Health & Science University as the Grace Phelps Distinguished Professor.

Van Ryn studied how physicians' perceptions about patients are impacted by ethnicity and socioeconomic status, and how this impacts the quality of care patients receive. Her research showed that physicians' perceptions were influenced by the socio-demographics of their patients, and that they perceived African-Americans more negatively than white patients. She also showed that physicians' perceptions of LGBT patients was shaped by their interaction with LGBT people during medical school.

Van Ryn founded Diversity Science, an organization that looked to accelerate equity and inclusion through evidenced-based approaches. The organization create training programs and policy documents that promote equity in healthcare, which have been deployed in California, Maryland, Michigan, Minnesota and Washington. In New York City, Black women are 12 times more likely to die during childcare than their white counterparts. She worked with the California Health Care Foundation to develop an e-learning course to challenge bias in maternity care.

== Selected publications ==
- M van Ryn; J Burke (1 March 2000). "The effect of patient race and socio-economic status on physicians' perceptions of patients". Social Science & Medicine. 50 (6): 813–828. doi:10.1016/s0277-9536(99)00338-x. ISSN 0277-9536. PMID 10695979. Wikidata Q56688987.
- S. M. Phelan; D. J. Burgess; M. W. Yeazel; W. L. Hellerstedt; J. M. Griffin; M. van Ryn (5 March 2015). "Impact of weight bias and stigma on quality of care and outcomes for patients with obesity". Obesity Reviews. 16 (4): 319–326. doi:10.1111/obr.12266. ISSN 1467-7881. PMC 4381543. PMID 25752756. Wikidata Q34466304.
- Michelle van Ryn; Steven S Fu (1 February 2003). "Paved with good intentions: do public health and human service providers contribute to racial/ethnic disparities in health?". American Journal of Public Health. 93 (2): 248–255. doi:10.2105/ajph.93.2.248. ISSN 1541-0048. PMC 1447725. PMID 12554578. Wikidata Q78850450.
