= Bishop Maginn High School =

Location
- 75 Park Avenue; Albany, (Albany County), NY 12202; 42°38′33″N 73°46′15″W

Information
- Type: Private, Coeducational
- Religious affiliation: Roman Catholic
- Established: 1977
- Status: Closed
- Closed: 2022
- Principal: Michael Tolan
- Grades: 9-12
- Colors: Blue and Gold
- Slogan: An experience of values and learning that will last a lifetime.
- Athletics conference: Western Athletic Conference, Section 2
- Mascot: Griffin
- Team name: Griffins
- Accreditation: Middle States Association of Colleges and Schools
- Website: www.bishopmaginn.org

Bishop Maginn High School was a Catholic high school in Albany, New York. It was a coeducational institution.

The school belonged to the school system of the Roman Catholic Diocese of Albany. It was accredited by the New York State Board of Regents and the Middle States Association.

In February of 2022, it was announced that Bishop Maginn would close at the end of the 2021-22 school year. The school officially closed on June 29, 2022 after years of declining enrollment and financial difficulties.

== History ==
Bishop Maginn was named after the former Auxiliary Bishop of Albany Edward Joseph Maginn. Two former high schools operated by the Roman Catholic Diocese of Albany, Vincentian Institute (VI) and Cardinal McCloskey High School, were merged in 1977, creating Bishop Maginn High School in the former McCloskey building. Declining enrollments and an aging Vincentian building made it necessary for the Diocese to use the newer McCloskey building for the new school. The first graduating class from Bishop Maginn was the Class of 1978. Formerly rivals, the students from both VI and McCloskey accepted each other in a harmonious display of unity, adopting an enthusiastic spirit for the new school. When the merger was announced in the spring of 1977, two McCloskey students had the idea to combine the mascots of the two schools - VI's lion and McCloskey's cardinal. David Strazzeri and Mark Kulzer researched and presented several images of the mythical creature to the merger committee. One would become the official Bishop Maginn Griffin insignia and mascot. The coat of arms for the newly created school contains the line 'Veni Lumen Cordium', which in Latin means 'Come light of the heart'.

In 2015, it was announced that due to declining enrollment and financial difficulties, Bishop Maginn would move to the former Cathedral Academy building in downtown Albany. The school relocated to the former Cathedral Academy for the 2015–2016 school year. Bishop Maginn's former building on Slingerland Street was leased to Green Tech High Charter School in March 2016.

The school was noted for its Karen population from Myanmar, for which much of the baseball team was Karen refugees.

On February 16, 2022, the Roman Catholic Diocese of Albany announced that Bishop Maginn High School would close at the end of the 2021-2022 school year. Declining enrollment was cited as the reason. The school officially closed its doors on June 30, 2022.

== Notable alumni ==
- Talor Battle, basketball player who last played for Hapoel Tel Aviv of the Israeli League
- Thomas D. Kinley (Vincentian Institute, Class of 1964), US Army major general
- Ernie Stautner, professional football player, coach and Pro Football Hall of Famer
