= Transportation 9-11 Medal =

9-11 Medal
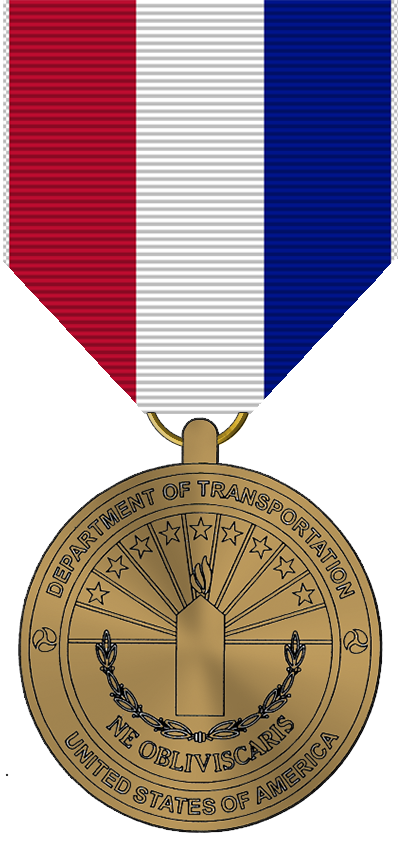
- Transportation 9-11 Medal
- Type: Medal
- Presented by: U.S. Department of Transportation
- Ribbon

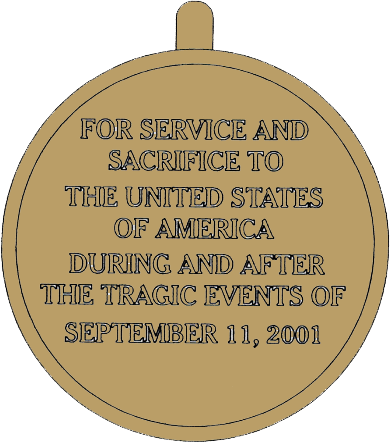
- Reverse
- Status: Inactive
- First award: September 11, 2001
- Final award: January 2, 2019

Precedence
- Next (higher): Joint Service Achievement Medal
- Next (lower): Coast Guard Achievement Medal
- Related: Transportation 9-11 Ribbon

The Transportation 9-11 Medal is a special decoration of the U.S. Department of Transportation which was first created in 2002. The decoration recognizes those civilians and members of the military who performed heroic deeds and valorous accomplishments in the immediate aftermath of the September 11, 2001 attacks on the United States of America.

The Transportation 9-11 Medal is not a simple service decoration, but rather recognizes individual acts of bravery that resulted in the saving of life or great assistance to the rescue efforts from the September 11th attacks. A separate military decoration, the Transportation 9-11 Ribbon, is presented to members of the U.S. military for general aid and assistance to the victims of the September 11th attacks.

The 9-11 Medal is a one-time decoration and is authorized for wear by both civilians and members of the U.S military.

== See also ==
- Awards and decorations of the United States government
