= John R. D'Araujo Jr. =

United States Army general

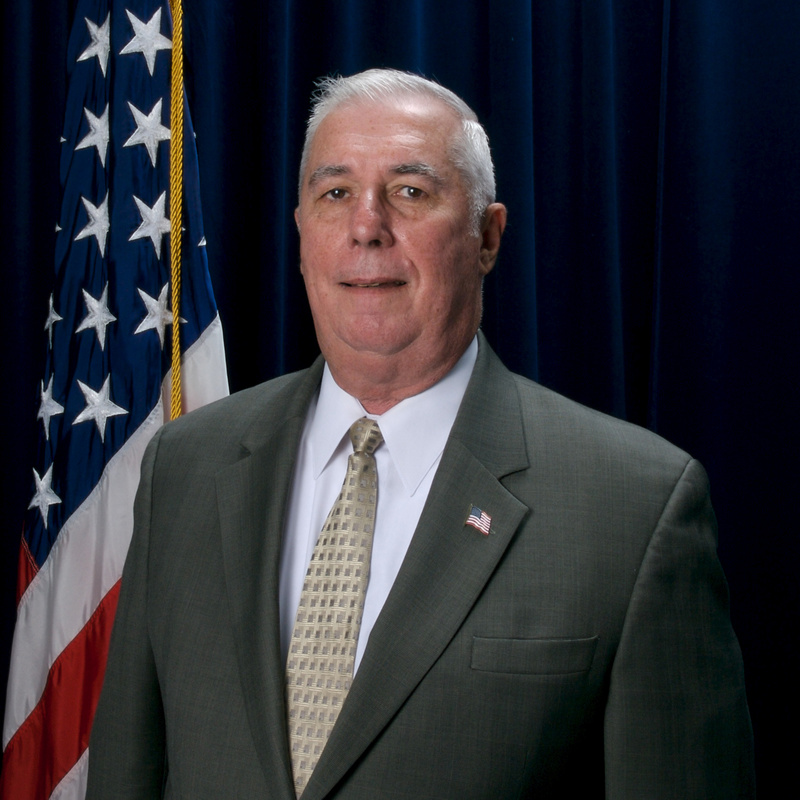
- D'Araujo as an official of FEMA, 2006
- Born: February 24, 1943 (age 83); Pepeekeo, Hawaii, United States
- Military career
- Allegiance: United States of America
- Branch: United States Army
- Service years: 1960–1995
- Rank: Major General
- Nickname: Jack
- Units: Hawaii National Guard; Army National Guard
- Commands: 103rd Troop Command; 29th Infantry Brigade; Director, Army National Guard; Acting chief of the National Guard Bureau
- Conflicts: Vietnam War
- Awards: Distinguished Service Medal (U.S. Army); Legion of Merit; Bronze Star Medal; Meritorious Service Medal; Army Commendation Medal; Army Achievement Medal; Combat Infantryman Badge
- Other work: Executive, Federal Emergency Management Agency; Consultant, homeland defense issues

John Robert D'Araujo Jr. (born February 24, 1943) is a retired United States Army major general who served as director of the Army National Guard and an official with the Federal Emergency Management Agency. He is the first Portuguese American to achieve the rank of major general.

== Early life ==
John R. D'Araujo Jr. ("Jack") was born in Pepeekeo, Hawaii on February 24, 1943, to John R. D'Araujo Sr. and Florence D'Araujo. John enlisted in the Hawaii Army National Guard in 1960. He graduated from St. Joseph High School in Hilo in 1962 and attended the University of Hawaii. He received his commission in 1963 after completing Officer Candidate School.

== Start of military career ==
D'Araujo served in a variety of command and staff assignments, primarily in the 29th Infantry Brigade. In 1968 and 1969 he deployed to South Vietnam during the Vietnam War as commander of a Mobile Advisory Team.

Upon returning to Hawaii D'Araujo continued his military career, including serving as commander of the Hawaii Army National Guard's Troop Command and United States Property and Fiscal Officer for Guam.

D'Araujo completed a Bachelor of Science degree in political science from Regents College (now Excelsior University), the University of the State of New York. He also graduated from the United States Army Command and General Staff College, and is a 1981 graduate of the United States Army War College.

== Later military career ==
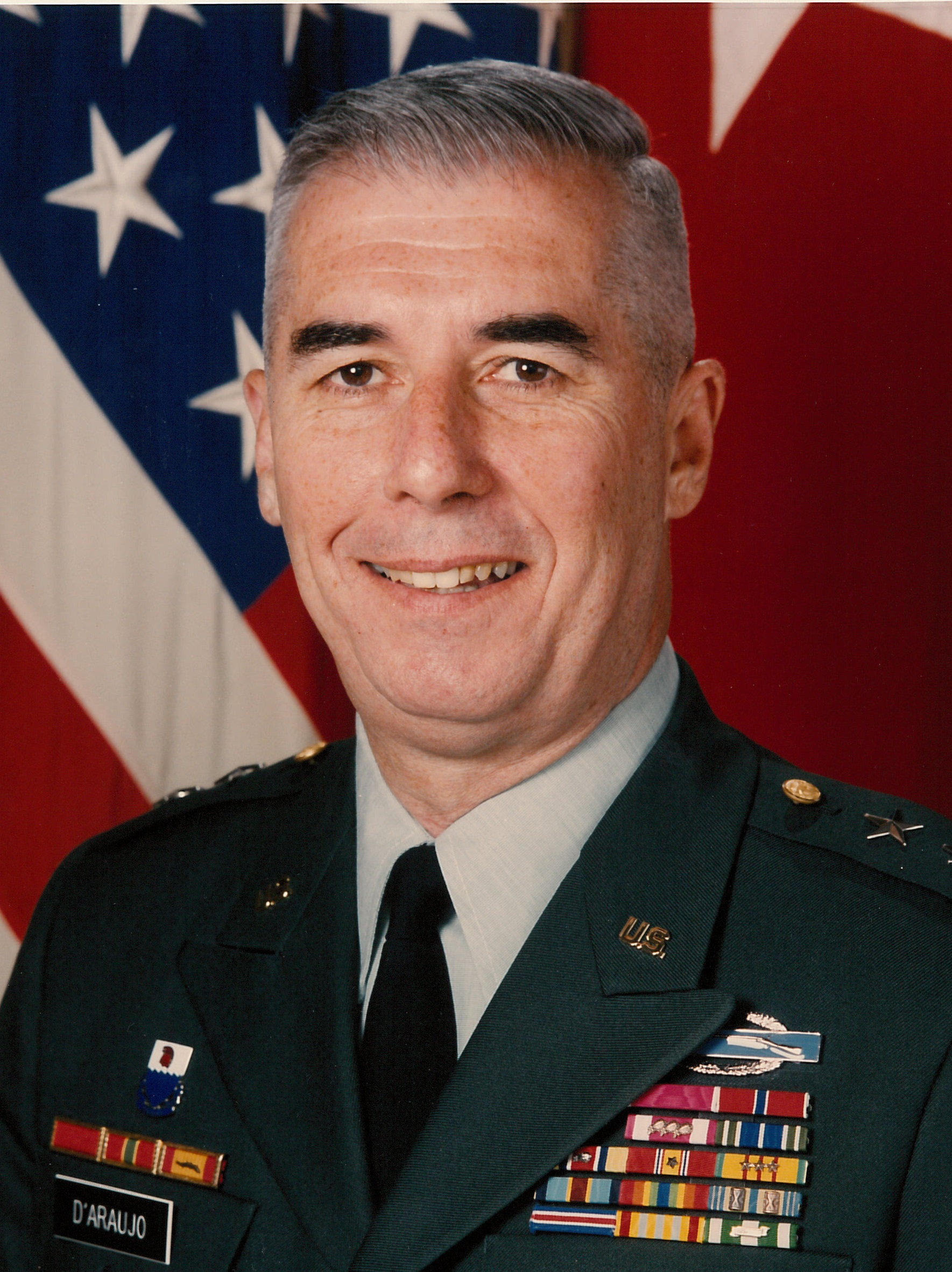
Major General John D'Araujo in 1993.

In 1983 D'Araujo was selected to serve as Senior Army National Guard Advisor for the Commander of U.S. Army Mobilization and Readiness Region III. He subsequently carried out an assignment at the National Guard Bureau as chief of the Mobilization Readiness Division, followed by assignment as chief of the National Guard Bureau's Training Division.

In June, 1987 D'Araujo was appointed Assistant Adjutant General – Army for the Hawaii National Guard. He served in this position until 1990, when he was named deputy director of the Army National Guard.

In 1993 D'Araujo was named director of the Army National Guard, and was succeeded as deputy director by William C. Bilo. He served in this position until retiring from the military in 1995.

== FEMA ==
After retiring from the military D'Araujo was employed as a consultant, and worked in the areas of homeland defense and military policy for the Department of Homeland Security and Department of Defense.

From 2002 to 2007 he worked for FEMA, including assistant director of the Readiness, Response and Recovery Directorate and Director of FEMA's Recovery Division.

Since 2007 he has continued to work as an independent consultant on defense and homeland security issues.

Military offices
Preceded by MG Raymond F. Rees	Director of the Army National Guard; 1993 - 1995	Succeeded by MG William A. Navas Jr.
