= Excelsior University =

Private online university in Albany, New York, US

Coordinates: 42.705388°N 73.862934°W

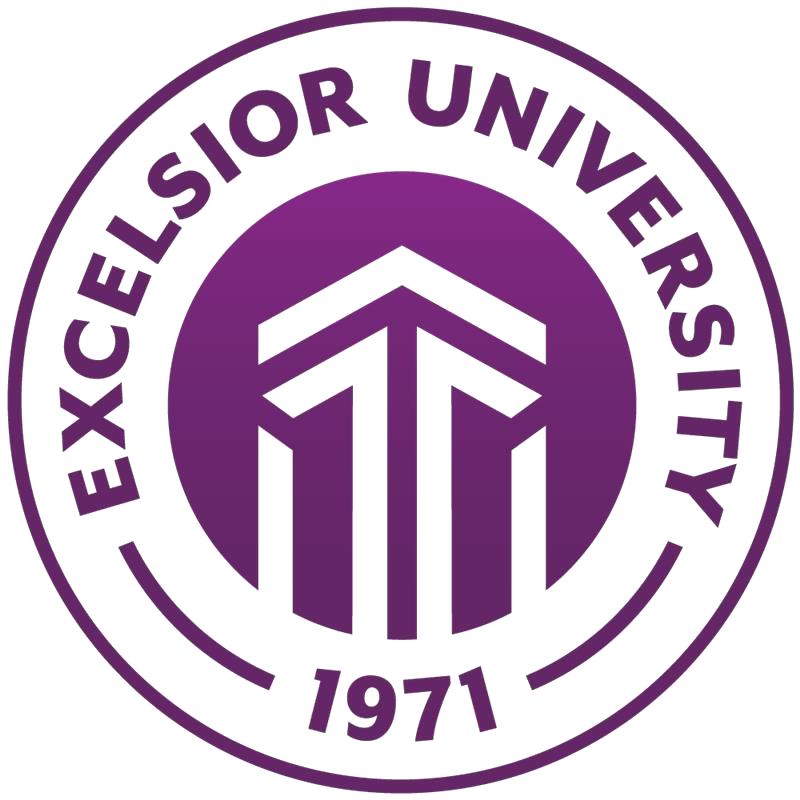
- Former names: Regents College; Excelsior College
- Motto: Ever Upward
- Type: Private online university
- Established: 1971; 55 years ago
- President: David Schejbal
- Provost: Christopher Cassirer
- Faculty: 547 part-time (fall 2025)
- Students: 14,477 (fall 2023)
- Undergraduates: 12,701 (fall 2023)
- Postgraduates: 1,776 (fall 2023)
- Location: Albany, New York, United States
- Campus: Online
- Colors: Purple, White
- Website: excelsior.edu

Excelsior University is a private online university in Albany, New York. It offers undergraduate and graduate degrees and comprises two schools: the College of Nursing and Health Sciences and the College of Liberal Arts and Sciences. It serves mostly non-traditional, adult working students through distance education programs.

== History ==
Excelsior College was founded in 1971 by the New York State Board of Regents as its external degree program, known as The Regents External Degree Program (REX). Its initial development was funded by grants from the Ford Foundation and the Carnegie Corporation. Known as Regents College from 1984 through 2000, it operated as a program of the Board of Regents, which also served as its board of trustees. In April 1998, the Board of Regents granted the school a charter to operate as an independent institution. On January 1, 2001, Regents College became Excelsior College. (Excelsior means "ever upwards" in Latin; it is the motto of the State of New York.) Excelsior College changed its name to Excelsior University on August 1, 2022.

== Academics ==
=== History (Regents College) ===
Regents College was from its inception a college that had faculty, majors, academic requirements, and advisors, but no courses. Instead, it provided students a framework for having academic credits earned elsewhere evaluated and assembled into a degree program. Regents College also provided a way to earn credits through its Regents College Examinations. For some subjects Regents College referred students to regionally-accredited colleges which provided instruction, accessible from the student's location whenever possible.

Regents College obtained regional accreditation with little difficulty. However, students did not qualify for Federal Student Aid, which funded instruction, not advising and evaluation students. Starting with its first graduate program, a Master of Arts in Liberal Studies that began in 1998, Regents College began adding distance learning courses through digital means, such as DVDs.

Since Regents College was designed to consolidate credit from other universities, any transfer credit from an accredited institution was accepted if it fell within one of college's degree programs and was earned within an allowable time limit.

=== Since 2001 ===
Known as Excelsior College beginning in 2001, and Excelsior University since 2022, the school is well known for its flexible, online degree programs.

Sources of college credit that can be used towards an Excelsior degree program include Excelsior distance learning courses, courses from other accredited institutions, non-collegiate training (including corporate, governmental, and military training) that has been evaluated for college-level credit by the American Council on Education (ACE) and National College Credit Recommendation Service (NCCRS), and assessments of prior learning portfolios.

Excelsior is a member of the Servicemembers Opportunity Colleges (SOC) Consortium of the American Association of State Colleges and Universities.

=== Accreditation ===
Excelsior University is regionally accredited by the Middle States Commission on Higher Education. Its bachelor's and master's nursing programs are accredited by the Accreditation Commission for Education in Nursing, Inc. (ACEN). The School of Nursing has twice been designated a Center of Excellence in Nursing Education by the National League for Nursing. Its bachelor's degree programs in electrical engineering technology, information technology, and nuclear engineering technology are accredited by the Technology Accreditation Commission of ABET, Inc. The bachelor's and master's degree programs in business are accredited by the International Assembly for Collegiate Business Education (IACBE).

== Notable alumni ==
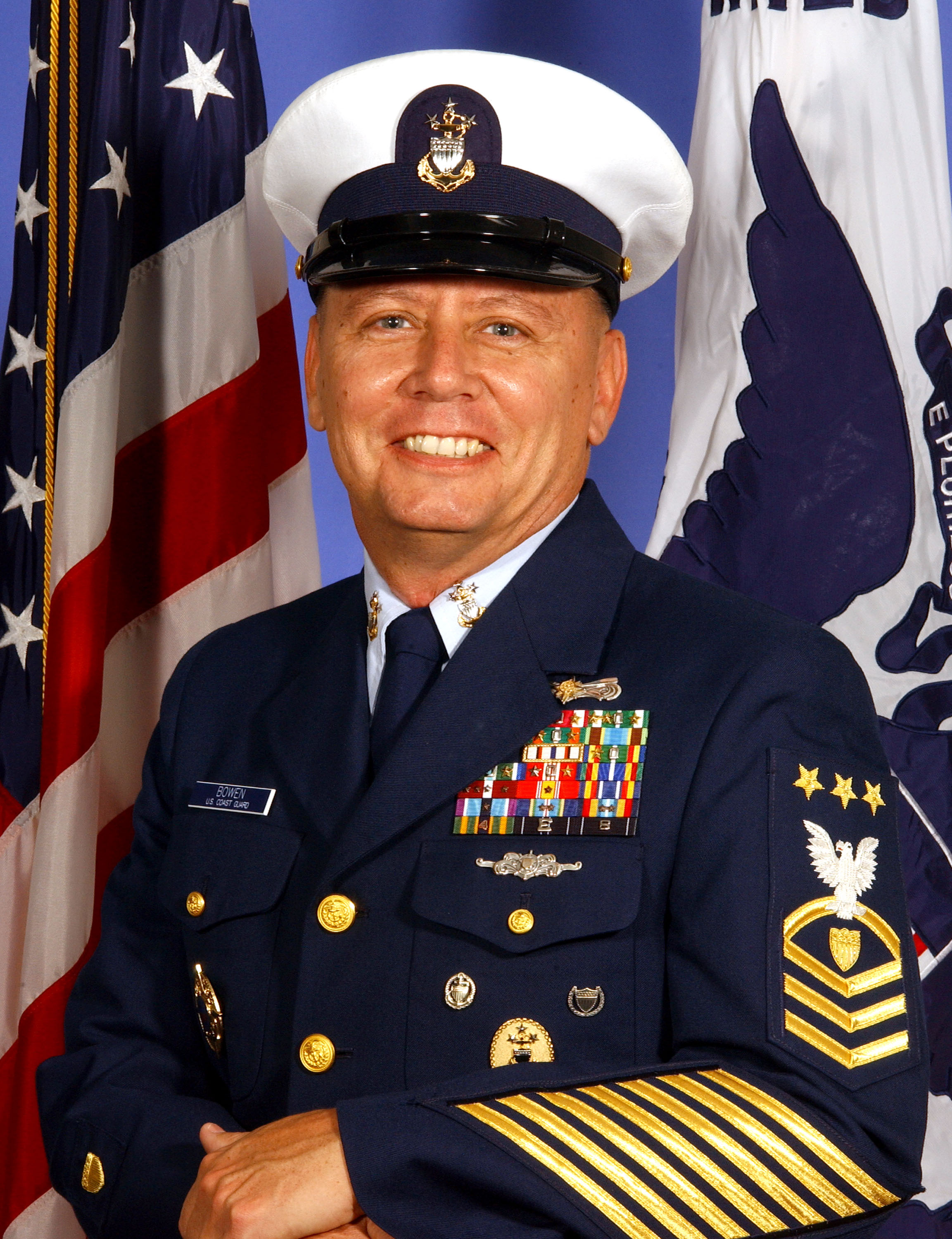
Charles W. Bowen, 10th Master Chief Petty Officer of the Coast Guard

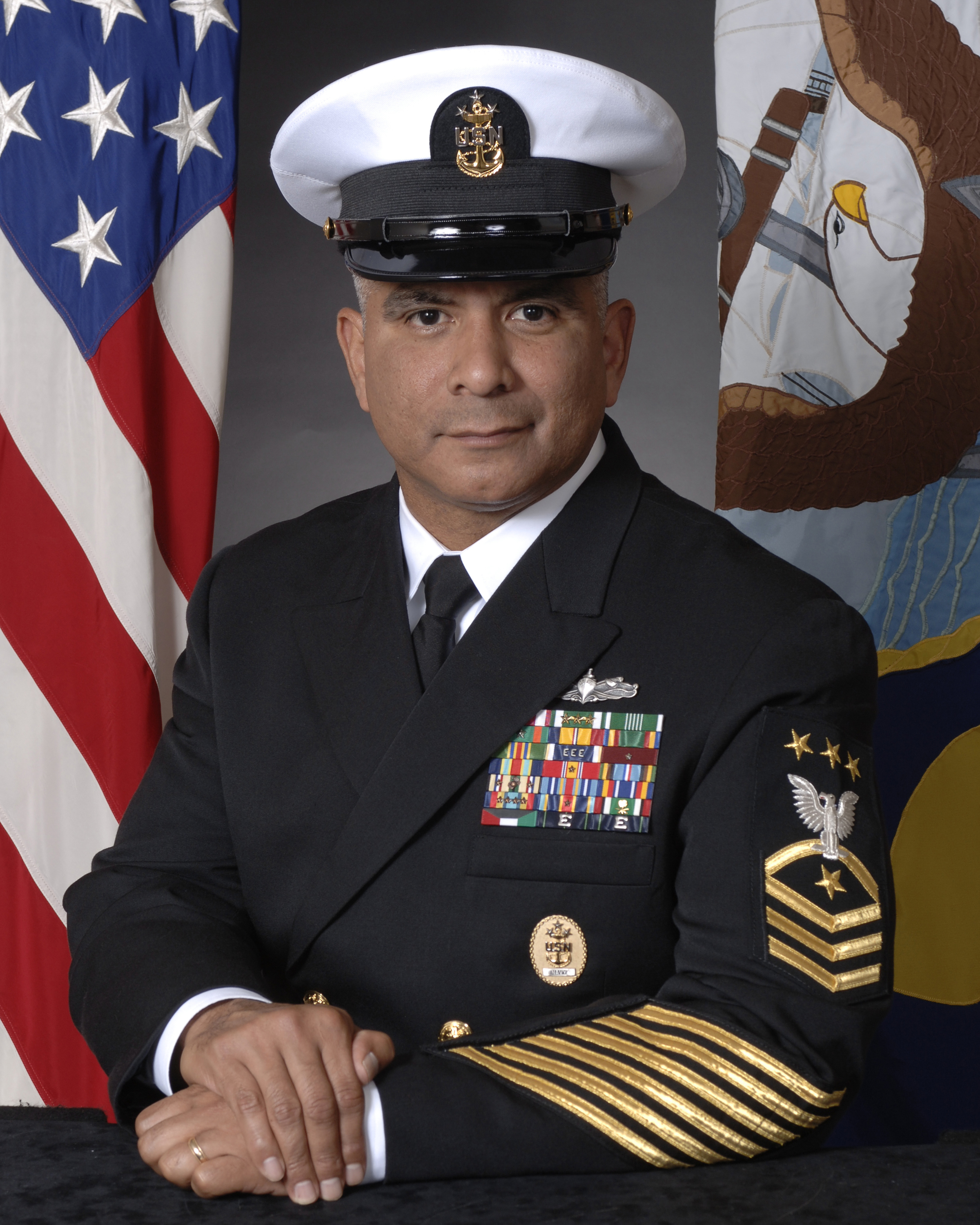
Joe R. Campa, 11th Master Chief Petty Officer of the Navy

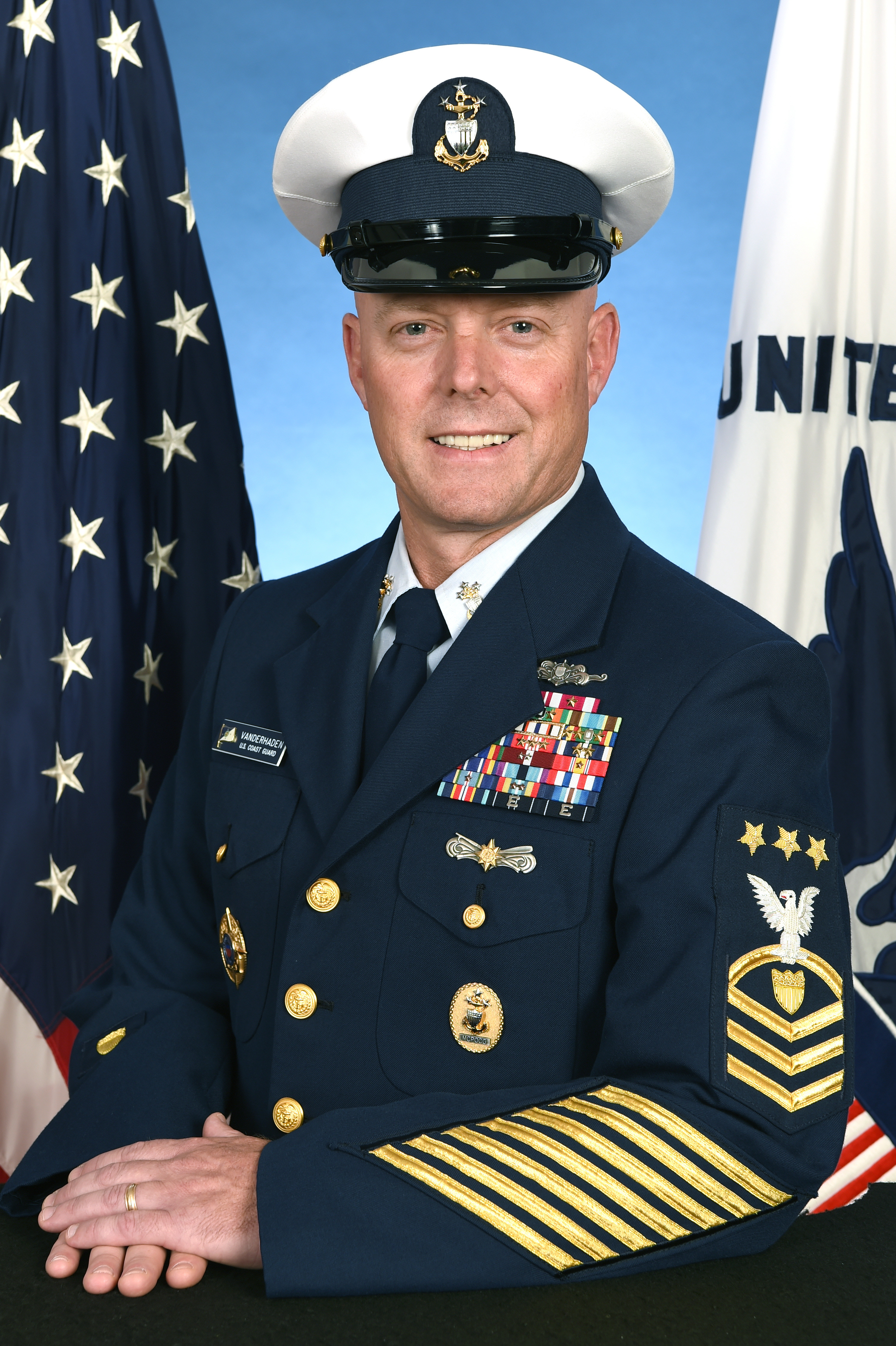
Jason M. Vanderhaden, 13th Master Chief Petty Officer of the Coast Guard

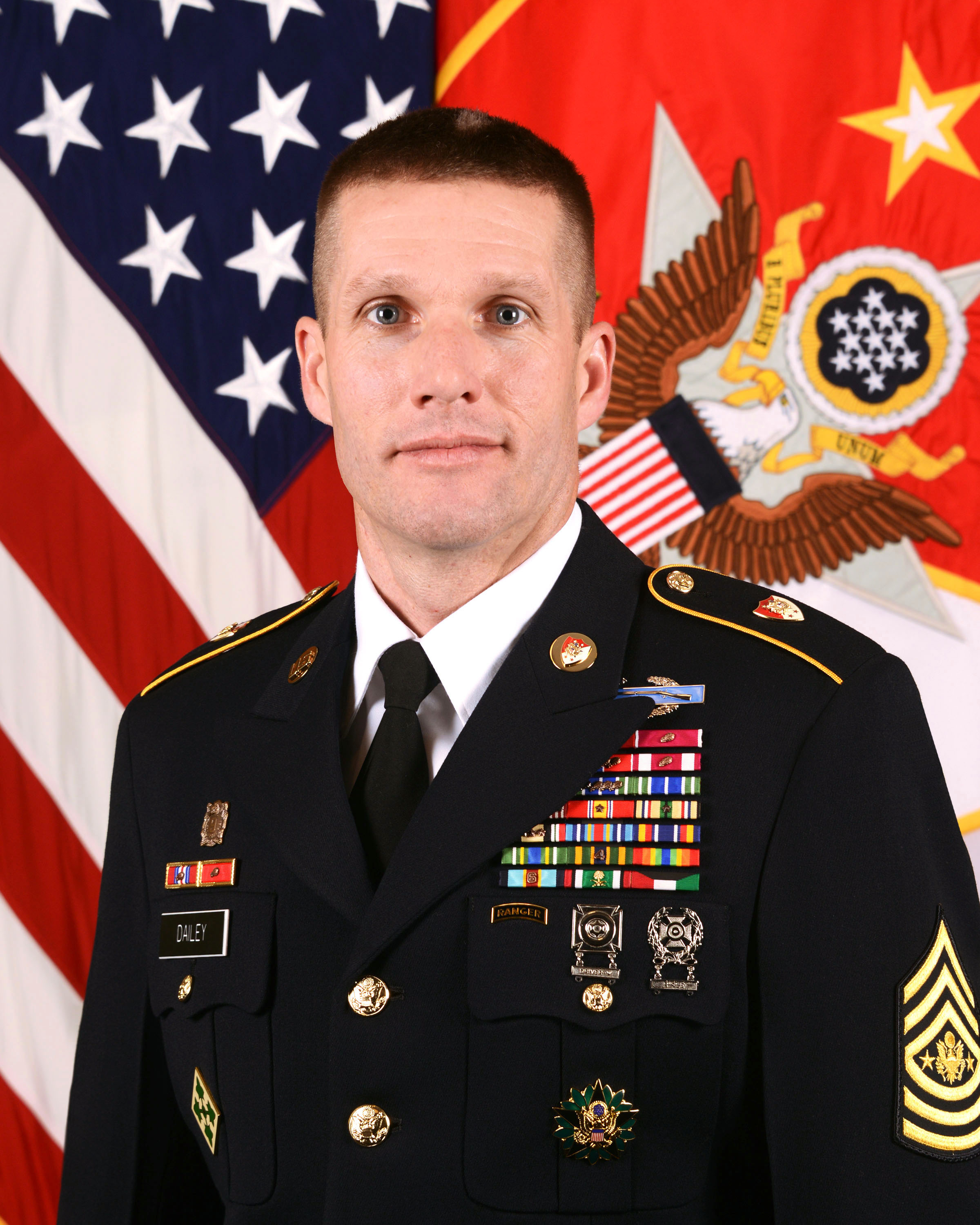
Daniel A. Dailey, 15th Sergeant Major of the Army

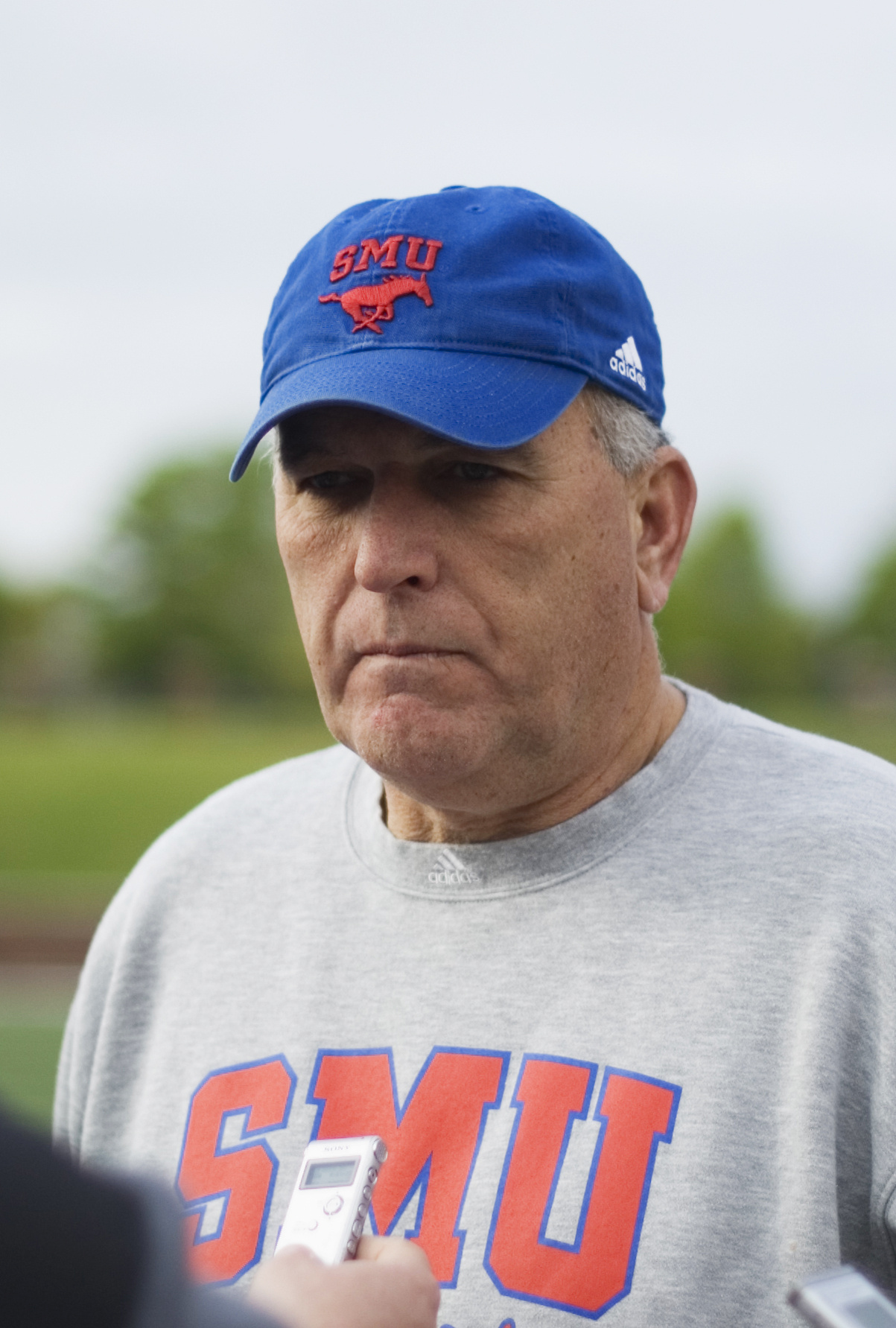
June Jones, Head Football Coach at Southern Methodist University

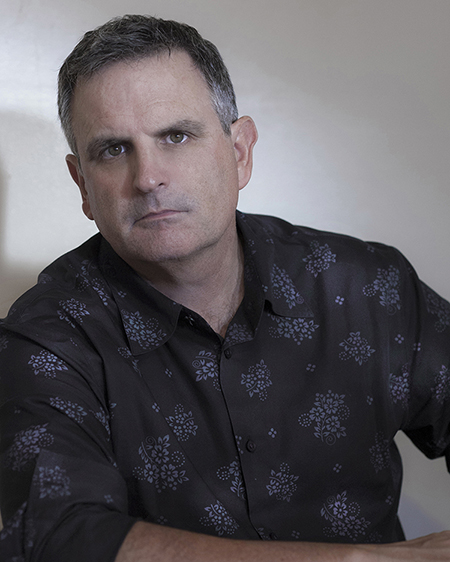
Gilbert King, Pulitzer Prize for General Nonfiction in 2013, author

- Deborah A. Ashenhurst (Class of 1994), adjutant general of the Ohio National Guard (2011–2015), appointed director of the Ohio Department of Veterans Services in 2019
- Edward D. Baca (Class of 1986), Chief of the National Guard Bureau from 1994 to 1998
- Eric C. Bauman, former chair of the California Democratic Party
- Ryan Binse (Class of 2016), Film producer
- Charles W. Bowen (Class of 2002), 10th Master Chief Petty Officer of the Coast Guard, 2006–2010
- Benjamin Bryant (Class of 2006), Obama administration communications official, television producer, host of The Brink with Benjamin Bryant television specials and podcast
- Joe R. Campa Jr., 11th Master Chief Petty Officer of the Navy, 2006–2008
- Stacey Campfield (Class of 1992), former Republican member of the Tennessee Senate from the 7th district.
- Daniel A. Dailey (Class of 2011), 15th Sergeant Major of the Army
- John R. D'Araujo Jr. (Class of 1987), director of the Army National Guard from 1993 to 1995
- Joseph Dweck, Senior Rabbi of the Spanish and Portuguese Jewish community of the United Kingdom
- Carl Hausman (Class of 1985), Professor of Journalism at Rowan University and author of Lies We Live By.
- Gilbert King (Class of 1985), winner of the 2013 Pulitzer Prize in non-fiction for Devil in the Grove: Thurgood Marshall, the Groveland Boys, and the Dawn of the New America.
- Thomas D. Kinley (Class of 1987), US Army major general
- Drew MacEwen (Class of 1997), Washington State Senator
- Judd Matheny (Class of 2000), member of the Tennessee House of Representatives from the 47th District.
- Anthony Munroe (Class of 1996), President of Essex County College
- Malcolm Nance (Class of 2011), author, scholar, and media commentator on international terrorism, intelligence, insurgency, and torture
- Anthony J. O'Donnell (Class of 1985), Maryland politician
- Richard Pope (Class of 1985), attorney and political candidate in the state of Washington
- Joseph J. Taluto (Class of 1986), retired Adjutant General of the New York National Guard
- Michelle van Ryn (Class of 1981), health researcher and professor at the Oregon Health & Science University
- Jason M. Vanderhaden (Class of 2015), 13th Master Chief Petty Officer of the Coast Guard
- Derrick Van Orden, U.S. congressman (2023–) from Wisconsin
- John E. Walsh (Class of 1990), adjutant general of Montana, Lieutenant Governor of Montana (2013-2014), United States Senator from Montana (2014–2015)
- Terry Williams, member of the Vermont Senate
- Phyllis J. Wilson (Class of 1988 (BA), 2010 (BS), 2021 (MPA)), 5th Command Chief Warrant Officer of the US Army Reserve and president of the Military Women's Memorial

== See also ==
- Excelsior College Examinations
