= Educational Credential Evaluators =

Nonprofitable organization

- Founded: 1980
- Type: Nonprofit
- Location: United States
- Services: Credential Evaluations
- Fields: Education
- Employees: 50–100
- Website: Official website

Educational Credential Evaluators, Inc. (ECE) is a public service nonprofit organization. ECE prepares evaluation reports that identify the United States equivalents of educational qualifications earned in other countries. Founded in 1980 by James S. Frey, the company is based and located in Milwaukee, Wisconsin.

ECE is a charter member of the National Association of Credential Evaluation Services (NACES), an organization incorporated in Delaware in 1987 to establish and maintain professional standards for private credential evaluation services. According to the United States Department of Education and the United States Department of State, NACES is one of two national credential evaluation associations that have membership guidelines and standards.

ECE offers support to other professionals within the field of international education and has been associated or involved with the following organizations:

- American Association of Collegiate Registrars and Admissions Officers (AACRAO)
- Asia-Pacific Association of International Education (APAIE)
- Association of Educational Assessment in Africa (AEAA)
- Caribbean Area Network for Quality Assurance in Tertiary Education (CANQATE)
- European Association for International Education (EAIE)
- International Education Association of South Africa (IEASA)
- NAFSA: Association of International Educators
- National Association of Graduate Admissions Professionals (NAGAP)
