= Michael P. Leavitt =

11th Master Chief Petty Officer of the Coast Guard

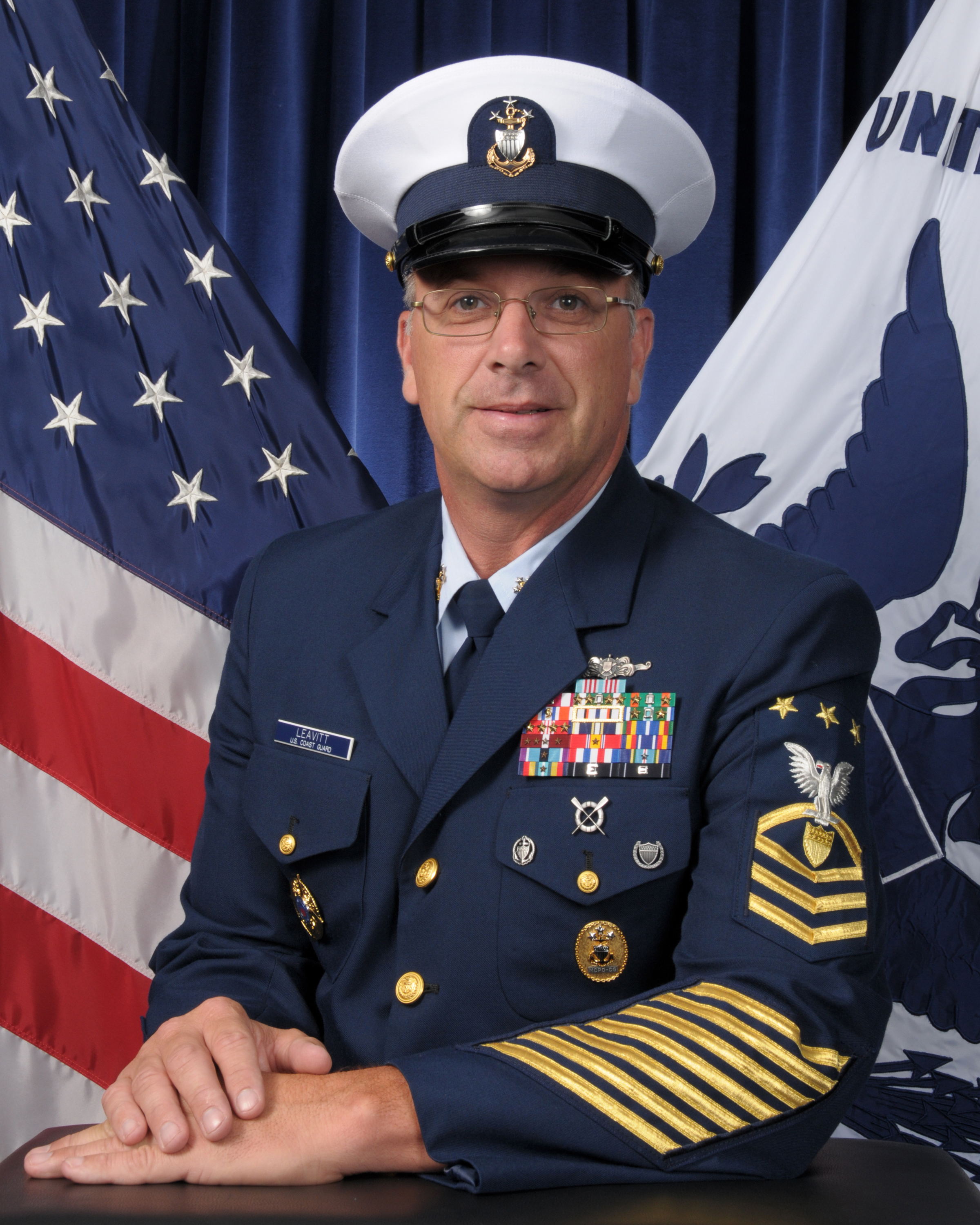
- Born: September 11, 1960 (age 66); Fruitland, Idaho, U.S.
- Military career
- Allegiance: United States of America
- Branch: United States Coast Guard
- Service years: 1982 - 2014
- Rank: Master Chief Petty Officer of the Coast Guard
- Awards: Coast Guard Distinguished Service Medal; Coast Guard Medal

Michael Phillip Leavitt (born September 11, 1960) was the eleventh Master Chief Petty Officer of the Coast Guard (MCPOCG). He assumed the position from MCPOCG Charles W. Bowen on May 21, 2010 and was relieved on May 22, 2014, by Steven W. Cantrell. Leavitt was previously serving as the Senior Enlisted Advisor to the Deputy Commandant for Operations at Coast Guard Headquarters, Washington, DC.

== Personal ==
Master Chief Leavitt's assignments have included:

- USCGC Boutwell in Seattle, Washington
- Station Coos Bay, Oregon
- Station Umpqua River, Oregon
- USCGC Naushon in Ketchikan, Alaska
- Executive Petty Officer (XPO) of Station Siuslaw River, Oregon
- Officer in Charge (OIC) of Station Maui, Hawaii
- XPO of USCGC Kanawha, Pine Bluff, Arkansas
- OIC of USCGC Point Doran, Everett, Washington
- OIC of CG Station Hatteras Inlet and Station Ocracoke, North Carolina
- OIC of CG Station Humboldt Bay, California
- OIC of CG Station Tillamook Bay, Oregon
- OIC of CG Station Cape Disappointment, Ilwaco, Washington

Master Chief Leavitt's awards include the Coast Guard Distinguished Service Medal, Coast Guard Medal, Meritorious Service Medal with an operational distinguishing device, five Coast Guard Commendation Medals with the operational distinguishing device, three Coast Guard Achievement Medals with the operational distinguishing device and numerous other individual and unit awards. He has earned a permanent Cutterman Insignia, Surfman Badge and the Officer in Charge Afloat and Ashore devices. He is a graduate of the Chief Petty Officers Academy Class 34. He earned a Bachelor of Science in Business Administration (BSBA) and is pursuing a Master of Arts in Training and Education.

== Awards and decorations ==
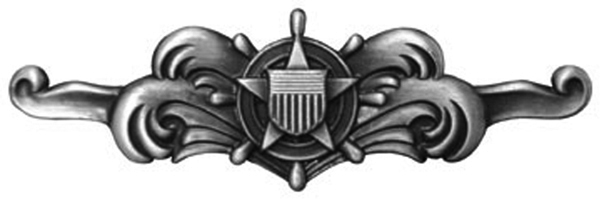
- Cutterman Insignia
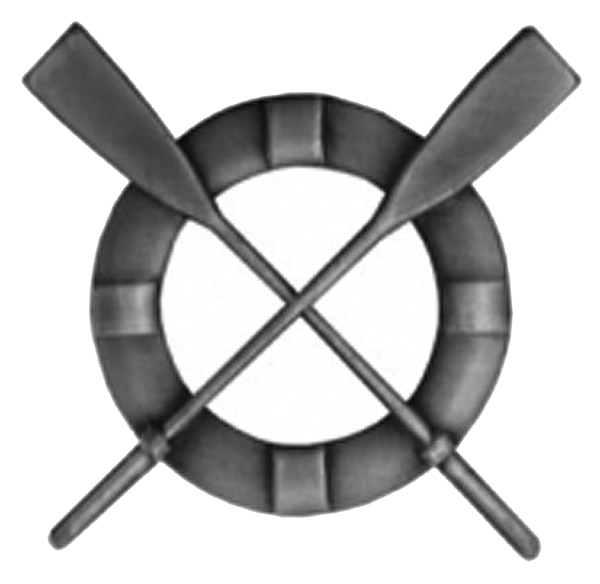
- Surfman Badge
- Officer-in-Charge Afloat Pin
- Officer-in-Charge Ashore Pin
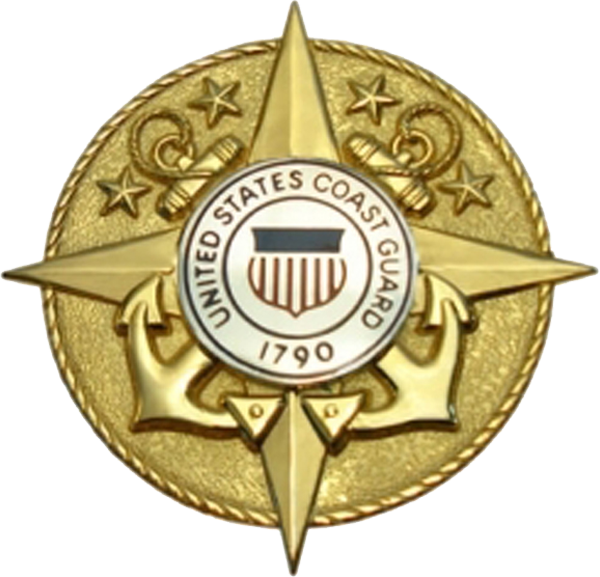
- Commandant Staff Badge
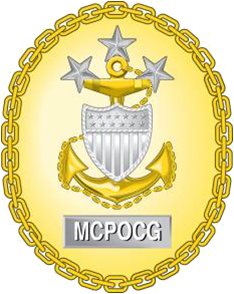
- Master Chief Petty Officer of the Coast Guard

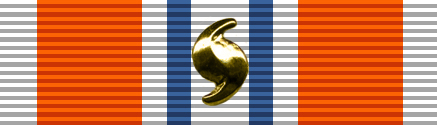
Coast Guard Distinguished Service Medal
Coast Guard Medal
Meritorious Service Medal with "O" device
Coast Guard Commendation Medal with 4 gold award stars and "O" device
Coast Guard Achievement Medal with 2 gold award stars and "O" device
Coast Guard Presidential Unit Citation with "hurricane symbol"
Secretary of Transportation Outstanding Unit Award
Coast Guard Unit Commendation with "O" device
Coast Guard Meritorious Unit Commendation with 2 gold award stars and "O" device
Meritorious Team Commendation with 4 gold award stars
Coast Guard "E" Ribbon
Coast Guard Bicentennial Unit Commendation
Coast Guard Good Conduct Medal with 1 silver and 4 bronze service stars
National Defense Service Medal with 1 service star
Global War on Terrorism Service Medal
Humanitarian Service Medal with service star
Transportation 9-11 Ribbon
Special Operations Service Ribbon with 1 silver service star
Sea Service Ribbon with 1 service star
Expert Rifle Marksmanship Medal
Pistol Marksmanship Ribbon with silver sharpshooter device

- 8 Service Stripes.

=== Coast Guard Medal citation ===
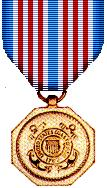

The President of the United States of America takes pleasure in presenting the Coast Guard Medal to Master Chief Boatswain's Mate Michael P. Leavitt, United States Coast Guard, for heroism on the evening of 25 February 2007, while part of a land rescue party from Station Humboldt Bay engaged in the perilous rescue of a man swept off the Humboldt Bay north jetty. Master Chief Petty Officer Leavitt and the other members of the rescue party ran approximately half a mile to the end of the moss-covered, partly awash jetty, between several dolosse, unusually-shaped concrete blocks similar to jacks used to protect harbor walls from the force of the sea. Master Chief Petty Officer Leavitt and another member carefully traversed down the twenty feet over the slippery dolosse to reach the victim and discovered he had multiple contusions, abrasions, and a possible leg fracture. The rescuers decided that the only way to get the victim to safety was to free him from the dolosse and physically carry him to the top of the jetty. While attempting to free the victim, multiple waves exceeding twenty feet in height pummeled the rescuers with such force that the survival helmet was yanked off Master Chief Petty Officer Leavitt's head, and the rescuers were nearly swept away several times. After freeing the victim, Master Chief Petty Officer Leavitt and the other rescuer carried him between them through breaking waves to the top of the jetty. They quickly determined the victim needed immediate medical attention and ran through breaking surf to the end of the jetty where a waiting Coast Guard Aviation Survival Technician began first aid. A helicopter then transferred the victim to the hospital where he eventually made a full recovery. Master Chief Petty Officer Leavitt demonstrated remarkable initiative, exceptional fortitude, and daring in spite of immediate personal danger in this rescue. His courage and devotion to duty are in keeping with the highest traditions of the United States Coast Guard.

Military offices
Preceded by Charles W. Bowen	Master Chief Petty Officer of the Coast Guard; 2010-2014	Succeeded by Steven W. Cantrell
