= Excelsior College Examinations =

American standardized test

Excelsior College Examinations (or ECE) are a series of eight, three-credit nursing theory tests offered by Excelsior College in Albany, New York. The exams are supported by corresponding online courses. Excelsior also offers the Clinical Performance in Nursing Exam, a two-day practical skills exam, as a capstone to the associate degree in nursing.

Excelsior also offers over 50 UExcel exams in liberal arts, business, education, and science. Many colleges and universities will grant college credit for each test, although UExcel credit is not as widely accepted as CLEP and DSST.

The exam administration period is typically 3 hours and the tests currently cost between $110 and $335. Each exam usually corresponds to a one or two semester introductory or secondary course on the topic, and many exams provide upper-division credit. Most ECE exams are considered equivalent to 3 credits in the semester system.

ECE exams are offered through Excelsior College and are administered at Pearson VUE test centers.
