= Steven N. Wickstrom =

United States Army general

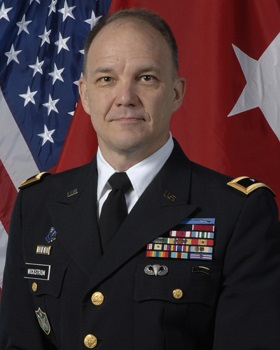
- National Guard Bureau photo of Wickstrom as a brigadier general in 2009
- Born: April 16, 1958 (age 68); Worcester, Massachusetts
- Military career
- Allegiance: United States
- Branch: United States Army
- Service years: 1981-2013
- Rank: Major General
- Units: United States Army; United States Army Reserve; Massachusetts Army National Guard; New York Army National Guard
- Commands: Company D, 1st Battalion, 181st Infantry Regiment, 26th Infantry Division; 1st Battalion, 181st Infantry, 29th Infantry Division; 26th Infantry Brigade, 29th Infantry Division; 42nd Infantry Division
- Conflicts: Operation Iraqi Freedom
- Awards: Army Distinguished Service Medal Legion of Merit; Meritorious Service Medal; Joint Service Commendation Medal; Army Commendation Medal
- Other work: Engineer

Steven N. Wickstrom (born April 16, 1958) is a retired Army National Guard officer. He attained the rank of major general as commander of the 42nd Infantry Division from 2009 to 2013.

== Early life and education ==
Steven Norman Wickstrom was born in Worcester, Massachusetts on April 16, 1958. When he was five, his family moved from Worcester to Medway, Massachusetts. He graduated from Medway High School in 1977, and was nominated to attend the United States Military Academy. He graduated in 1981, and was commissioned a second lieutenant of Infantry. In 1988, he received a Master of Science degree in mechanical engineering from Texas A&M University.

== Military education ==
During his military career, courses Wickstrom completed include the Infantry Officer Basic and Advanced Courses, the United States Army Command and General Staff College, and the United States Army War College (2002). He is a 2010 graduate of the Joint Task Force Commander's Course, and a 2011 graduate of the Senior Executive Seminar at the George C. Marshall European Center for Security Studies. Wickstrom also graduated from the Airborne and Ranger schools.

== Army career ==
Wickstrom served on Army active duty from 1981 to 1986. His assignments included: Platoon Leader, Company B, 4th Battalion, 54th Infantry Regiment, 194th Armor Brigade, Fort Knox, Kentucky (November 1981-November 1982); Platoon Leader, Company A, 4th Battalion, 54th Infantry (November 1982-February 1983); Executive Officer, Company B, 4th Battalion, 54th Infantry (March 1983- February 1984); Support Platoon Leader, 4th Battalion, 54th Infantry (March 1984-February 1985); and Adjutant (personnel staff officer, S-1), 2nd Battalion, 14th Infantry Regiment, 10th Mountain Division, Fort Benning, Georgia (July 1985-August 1986).

== Start of National Guard career ==
Wickstrom transferred to the United States Army Reserve Control Group in August 1986. In March 1990 he transferred into the Massachusetts Army National Guard. His initial postings included: Personnel staff officer (S-1), 1st Battalion, 181st Infantry Regiment, 26th Infantry Division (March–July 1990); Commander, Company D, 1st Battalion, 181st Infantry, 26th Infantry Division (July 1990-August 1992); Counterintelligence Staff Officer, Headquarters, 26th Infantry Division (September 1992-August 1993); Logistics Staff Officer (S-4), 26th Infantry Brigade (September 1993-July 1994); Plans, Operations and Training Staff Officer (S-3), 26th Infantry Brigade (July 1994-June 1995); and Executive Officer, 1st Battalion, 181st Infantry, 29th Infantry Division (July 1995-June 1997).

== Later National Guard career ==
Wickstrom was promoted to lieutenant colonel in 1997. His assignments as a senior field grade officer included: Commander, 1st Battalion, 181st Infantry, 29th Infantry Division (July 1997-July 1999); Assistant Deputy Chief of Staff of Plans and Operations, Headquarters, State Area Command, Massachusetts Army National Guard (July 1999-May 2000); Executive Officer, 26th Infantry Brigade, 29th Infantry Division (June 2000-September 2000); Program Coordinator, 26th Infantry Brigade, 29th Infantry Division (October 2000-February 2001); Strategic Planning Officer, Headquarters, State Area Command, Massachusetts Army National Guard (March 2001-July 2001); Student, United States Army War College, Carlisle Barracks, Pennsylvania (August 2001-June 2002); Commander, 26th Infantry Brigade, 29th Infantry Division (July 2002-December 2004); and Staff Director, Joint Force Headquarters, Massachusetts National Guard (January 2005-September 2005).

== Operation Iraqi Freedom ==
From June to September 2006, Wickstrom served at Camp Victory, Iraq as Team Leader, Joint Center for Operational Analysis (Forward), United States Joint Forces Command.

== Career as general officer ==
=== Brigadier general ===
Upon returning to the United States in October 2006, Wickstrom was assigned as deputy commander of the 42nd Infantry Division. He was promoted to brigadier general in October 2007, and served as deputy commander until 2009.

=== 42nd Division commander ===
In May 2009, Wickstrom succeeded Paul C. Genereux as commander of the 42nd Infantry Division. During his command, division soldiers assisted civilian authorities to respond to several natural disasters, including Hurricanes Irene and Sandy.

=== Retirement ===
Wickstrom completed his command of the 42nd Division in April 2013, after which he retired from the military. He was succeeded by Harry E. Miller Jr.

== Awards ==
=== Individual awards ===
- Army Distinguished Service Medal
- Legion of Merit
- Meritorious Service Medal (with 1 Bronze Oak Leaf Cluster)
- Joint Service Commendation Medal
- Army Commendation Medal (with 4 Bronze Oak Leaf Clusters)
- Army Reserve Component Achievement Medal (with 4 Bronze Oak Leaf Clusters)
- National Defense Service Medal (with 1 Bronze Service Star)
- Iraq Campaign Medal (with 1 Bronze Service Star)
- Global War on Terrorism Service Medal
- Armed Forces Reserve Medal (with Silver Hourglass and M Device)
- Army Service Ribbon
- Army Overseas Service Ribbon
- Army Reserve Components Overseas Training Ribbon (with Numeral 2)

=== Unit awards ===
- Joint Meritorious Unit Award

=== Tabs and badges ===
- Ranger tab
- Expert Infantryman Badge
- Parachutist Badge

== Effective dates of promotion ==
- Major General, December 22, 2010
- Brigadier General, October 1, 2007
- Colonel, June 29, 2001
- Lieutenant Colonel, September 24, 1997
- Major, November 20, 1992
- Captain, December 1, 1984
- First Lieutenant, November 27, 1982
- Second Lieutenant, May 27, 1981

== Civilian career ==
After completing his active Army service, Wickstrom became an engineer and operated his own business in Massachusetts, which he continued to do during his National Guard service.

== Family ==
Upon leaving the Army 1986, Wickstrom settled in Southboro, and later moved to Upton. Wickstrom met his wife Collette while they were students at Medway High School, and they resided in Upton with their sons, Zach and Steve.

== Sources ==
=== Internet ===
- "American Legion Biography, Steven N. Wickstrom" (PDF). legionpost178.org/. Millerton NY: American Legion Post 178. 2013.
- National Guard Bureau General Officer Management Office (July 1, 2011). "National Guard Bureau Biography, Steven N. Wickstrom". www.nationalguard.mil/. Arlington, VA: National Guard Bureau.
- Sanzo, Rachel (April 15, 2013). "Rainbow Division Welcomes New Commander". www.army.mil/. Washington, DC: U.S. Army.
- City of Worcester. "Worcester, Massachusetts Birth Certificates". Worcester Public Records. Worcester, MA: City of Worcester, Massachusetts.

=== Newspapers ===
- Caywood, Thomas (May 10, 2009). "Responsibility of Rank". Worcester Telegram & Gazette. Worcester, MA.

Military offices
Preceded by Paul C. Genereux	Commander of the 42nd Infantry Division; 2009–2013	Succeeded by Harry E. Miller Jr.
