= Harry E. Miller Jr. =

United States Army general

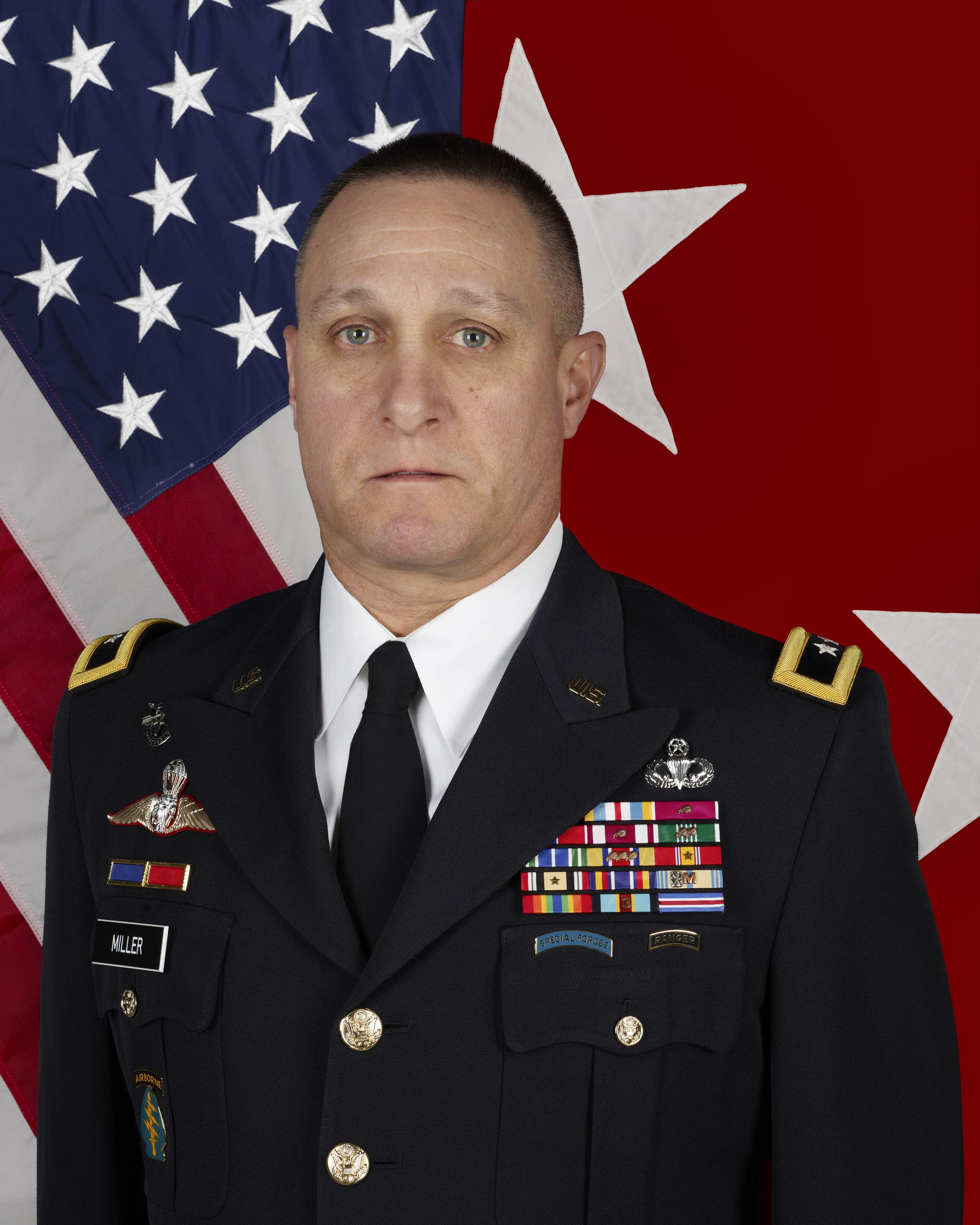
- National Guard Bureau photo of Miller as commander of the 42nd Infantry Division in 2013
- Born: 1958 (age 67–68); Pittsburgh, Pennsylvania
- Military career
- Allegiance: United States
- Branch: United States Army
- Service years: 1980–2018
- Rank: Major General
- Units: United States Army; United States Army Reserve; New Hampshire Army National Guard; New York Army National Guard
- Commands: Battery B, 3rd Battalion, 4th Air Defense Artillery; Operational Detachment - Alpha 196, 3rd Battalion, 1st Special Forces Group; Company C, 3rd Battalion, 1st Special Forces Group; 54th Troop Command, New Hampshire Army National Guard; 10th Mountain Division Rear Detachment; 42nd Infantry Division
- Conflicts: Operation Iraqi Freedom
- Awards: Army Distinguished Service Medal; Defense Superior Service Medal; Legion of Merit; Bronze Star Medal
- Other work: Sales representative, Pfizer; Executive director, Veterans Count, Easter Seals; Deputy director for strategic integration, Defense Intelligence Agency

Harry E. Miller Jr. (born c. 1958) is a retired Army National Guard officer. A veteran of the Iraq War, he attained the rank of major general as commander of the 42nd Infantry Division, a position he held from 2013 to 2017.

== Early life ==
Harry Edward Miller Jr. was born in Pittsburgh, Pennsylvania. He was raised in the Pittsburgh area, and graduated from Shaler Area High School in 1976. In 1978 he graduated from Valley Forge Military Academy and College with an Associate of Arts degree in liberal studies. Miller graduated from Washington & Jefferson College in 1980 with a Bachelor of Arts degree in economics. He completed the Reserve Officers' Training Corps program at Washington & Jefferson, and received his commission as a second lieutenant of Air Defense Artillery.

== Early career ==
At the start of his United States Army career, Miller completed Air Defense Artillery Officer Basic Course at Fort Bliss, Texas, followed by the Basic Airborne Course at Fort Benning, Georgia and Ranger School, also at Fort Benning.

Miller's early assignments included: platoon leader, Battery D, 2nd Battalion, 59th Air Defense Artillery, 1st Armored Division, West Germany (February 1981 – October 1982); platoon leader, Battery B, 2nd Battalion, 59th Air Defense Artillery (October 1982 – March 1983); maintenance officer, Battery B, 2nd Battalion, 59th Air Defense Artillery (March 1983 – September 1983); and executive officer, Battery B, 2nd Battalion, 59th Air Defense Artillery (September 1983 – February 1984). From March to September, 1984, Miller was a student at Fort Benning's Infantry Officer Advanced Course.

== Continuing career ==
As Miller's Army career progressed, his assignments included: assistant training, readiness and operations officer (S3), 3rd Battalion, 4th Air Defense Artillery, 82nd Airborne Division, Fort Bragg, North Carolina (September 1984 – June 1985); commander, Battery B, 3rd Battalion, 4th Air Defense Artillery (June 1985 – February 1987); and personnel staff officer (S1), 3rd Battalion, 4th Air Defense Artillery (May 1987 – December 1987). From December 1987 to August 1988, Miller was a student in the Special Forces Detachment Officer Qualification Course, which is held at Fort Bragg's John F. Kennedy Special Warfare Center and School.

Miller's career in special operations included: commander, operational detachment - Alpha 196, 3rd Battalion, 1st Special Forces Group, Fort Lewis, Washington (August 1988 – December 1989); future plans officer (S5), 3rd Battalion, 1st Special Forces Group, (December 1989 – November 1990); commander, Company C, 3rd Battalion, 1st Special Forces Group (November 1990 – July 1991); and executive officer, Company B, 3rd Battalion, 1st Special Forces Group (July 1991 – July 1992).

== Later career ==
In 1992, Miller received a Master of Business Administration degree from Saint Martin's University in Lacey, Washington. He left the army in 1992, and was a member of the United States Army Reserve's Control Group (Ready Reserve). In November 1993 he was assigned as plans, operations, training, and intelligence officer (S2/3) for the Reserve's 362nd Quartermaster Battalion in Kinston, North Carolina, and he served in this position until September 1994.

In 1995, Miller joined the New Hampshire Army National Guard. His initial assignments included: marksmanship/competitive events coordinator, Headquarters, State Area Command, Concord, New Hampshire (February 1995 – November 1996); executive officer, 54th Troop Command (November 1996 – December 1997); chief, Training Division (G3), Headquarters, State Area Command, (January 1998 – April 1999); commander, 54th Troop Command, (May 1999 – February 2002); deputy chief of staff personnel (G1), Headquarters, State Area Command (March 2002 – August 2004); deputy chief of staff operations (G3), Headquarters, State Area Command (August 2004 – February 2005); and director of operations (J3), Joint Force Headquarters, (February 2005 – January 2006).

In 2005, Miller completed the United States Army War College, and received a Master of Science degree in strategic studies. From February 2006 to May 2007, Miller was assigned as regional border transition chief, Iraq Assistance Group, 1st Infantry Division (Forward), Multi-National Corps – Iraq at Camp Delta.

After returning to New Hampshire, Miller's assignments included director of operations (J3), Joint Force Headquarters – New Hampshire (May 2007 – September 2007). He then returned to Iraq, this time as liaison officer, Combined Joint Special Operations Task Force-Arabian Peninsula, 5th Special Forces Group, Multi-National Corps-Iraq, Camp Victory, Iraq (October 2007 – July 2008).

Following his second deployment to Iraq, Miller served again as director of operations (J3) for the New Hampshire National Guard from July 2008 to April 2009.

== Career as general officer ==
After becoming a general officer in 2009, Miller was assigned as director of doctrine, training and force development (J7) at the National Guard Bureau in Arlington, Virginia (May 2009 – September 2010). He then served as senior commander of the 10th Mountain Division's Rear Detachment at Fort Drum, New York (September 2010 – January 2012).

In February 2012, Miller was assigned as assistant adjutant general—army at Joint Force Headquarters, New York Army National Guard in Latham. He served until becoming commander of the 42nd Infantry Division. In April 2013, Miller was assigned as commander of the 42nd Infantry Division, succeeding Steven N. Wickstrom.

Miller's continuing education as a general officer included: Army Strategic Leadership Development Program-Basic (2010); General Officer Legal Orientation Course (2010); Army Strategic Leadership Development Program-Intermediate (2012); CAPSTONE, National Defense University (2013); Army Strategic Leadership Development Program - Advanced (2014); Dual Status Commander Course (2014); National Security Studies Management Course (NSSMC) (2015) Syracuse University; and National and International Security Course (NIS), Harvard University, (2015).

In March 2017, Miller completed a change of command ceremony with his successor, Brigadier General Steven Ferrari; the official change of command was scheduled for May. The early ceremony was timed to enable Miller to begin a new active duty assignment as the deputy director for Strategic Integration as well as the Director of the Reserve Integration Office at the Defense Intelligence Agency. He retired from the military in 2018.

== Effective dates of promotion ==
- Major General, June 18, 2013
- Brigadier General, June 19, 2009
- Colonel, March 18, 2002
- Lieutenant Colonel, September 24, 1997
- Major, October 1, 1992
- Captain, January 1, 1984
- First Lieutenant, November 28, 1981
- Second Lieutenant, May 24, 1980

== Awards ==
- Army Distinguished Service Medal
- Defense Superior Service Medal (with 1 Bronze Oak Leaf Cluster)
- Legion of Merit (with 1 Bronze Oak Leaf Cluster)
- Bronze Star Medal (with 1 Bronze Oak Leaf Cluster)
- Meritorious Service Medal (with 1 Bronze Oak Leaf Cluster)
- Army Commendation Medal (with 2 Bronze Oak Leaf Clusters)
- Army Achievement Medal
- Army Reserve Components Achievement Medal (with 3 Oak Leaf Clusters)
- National Defense Service Medal (with Bronze Service Star)
- Iraq Campaign Medal (with Bronze Service Star)
- Global War on Terrorism Service Medal
- Armed Forces Reserve Medal (with M Device and Silver Hourglass)
- Army Service Ribbon
- Overseas Service Ribbon (with Numeral 3)
- Reserve Components Overseas Training Ribbon
- Special Forces Tab
- Ranger tab
- Master Parachutist Badge
- Thailand Parachute Badge
- Army Presidential Unit Citation
- Meritorious Unit Citation

== Civilian career ==
Miller was employed for over nineteen years (1994–2013) as a sales representative with the Pfizer pharmaceutical corporation. From 2013 to 2015, Miller was the executive director of Easter Seals Military & Veterans Services program.

== Family ==
Miller is married to Melissa Kay Cook, formerly of Fayetteville, North Carolina. They have three children, daughters Courtney, Emily, and Abbey. The Miller family are residents of Bedford, New Hampshire.

== Sources ==
=== Internet ===
- "Biography, Harry E. Miller Jr". General Officer Management. Arlington, VA: National Guard Bureau.
- Durr, Eric (March 3, 2017). "Brig. Gen. Steven Ferrari takes command of New York National Guard's 42nd Infantry Division". Defense Video Imagery Distribution System (DVIDS). Washington, DC: Defense Media Activity.
- "Defense Intelligence Agency Biography, Harry E. Miller, Jr". www.dia.mil/. Washington, DC: Defense Intelligence Agency.

=== Newspapers ===
- "Military Honors: Brigadier General Harry E. Miller". Pittsburgh Post-Gazette. Pittsburgh, PA. January 19, 2010. p. 22.
- Shaloup, Dean (November 14, 2012). "Nashua Guardsman to lead NY-based 42nd Infantry Division". Nashua Telegraph. Nashua, NH.
- Ball, Greg (June 17, 2013). "Chairman Ball Announces Promotion of BG Miller to Major General of the NYS Division of Military and Naval Affairs". ball4ny.com/. Pawling, NY.
- Brown, Terry (August 10, 2013). "Infantry commander adds a star". Times Union. Albany, NY.

=== Magazines ===
- McDaniel, Suellen R., ed. (January 2026). "Biography, Harry E. Miller, Jr" (PDF). Rainbow Reville. Newton, North Carolina: Rainbow Division Veterans Foundation.

Military offices
Preceded by Steven N. Wickstrom	Commander of the 42nd Infantry Division; 2013–2017	Succeeded by Steven Ferrari
