= Coast Guard Station Ponce de Leon Inlet =

United States Coast Guard station in New Smyrna Beach, Florida

- Part of the 7th District
- New Smyrna Beach, Florida

Site information
- Type: Coast Guard Station
- Owner: United States Coast Guard

Location
- Coordinates: 29.064°N 80.915°W

Coast Guard Station Ponce de Leon Inlet is a United States Coast Guard boat station located in New Smyrna Beach, Florida and is part of the Coast Guard 7th District, Sector Jacksonville.

While in the late 1980s, the crew consisted of only 4 men, the crew at Coast Guard Station Ponce de Leon Inlet now is made of 31 active duty and 15 United States Coast Guard Reserve personnel. The Ponce de Leon Inlet Aids to Navigation Team (ANT) performs Search & Rescue, Law Enforcement and fisheries patrols, also do maintenance work at the Cape Canaveral lighthouse.
