= International Education Association of South Africa =

- Abbreviation: IEASA
- Formation: 1997
- Type: Education Association
- Headquarters: Block F-4, Hatfield Gardens, 333 Grosvenor Street, Hatfield, Pretoria, 0083
- Location: Pretoria, South Africa
- Region served: South Africa
- Official language: English
- President: Orla Quinlan
- Website: www.ieasa.studysa.org

The post-apartheid era provided South African Universities and Technikons the opportunity to further enhance existing international relations, or to establish new relationships, towards promoting education in South Africa in the context of internationalization of higher education. In 1992 already, Dr Derek Swemmer (Registrar: University of the Witwatersrand) and Dr Roshen Kishun (Registrar University of Natal) started discussions that focused on areas of mutual concern and interests. One of the key challenges were to set a common agenda for all South African tertiary institutions with a key focus on internationalisation. After a number of meetings between the various stakeholders, the International Education Association of South Africa (IEASA) was officially launched on 29 January 1997.

== International Education Policy ==
The International Education Association of South Africa aims to draft, monitor and/or implement policies that contribute towards international education. To this end, IEASA promotes and maintains cooperative relationships with relevant government and other departments and bodies.

== Publications ==
IEASA annually publishes Study SA, a South African publication that provides an overview of South African Higher Education issues and developments.
