= Transportation 9-11 Ribbon =

9-11 Ribbon
- Transportation 9-11 Ribbon
- Type: Ribbon
- Presented by: U.S. Department of Transportation
- Status: Inactive
- First award: 2004 (retroactive to September 11, 2001)
- Final award: 2019 (retroactive to September 11, 2002)

Precedence
- Next (higher): Humanitarian Service Medal
- Next (lower): Coast Guard: Special Operations Service Ribbon; Military Outstanding Volunteer Service Medal

The Transportation 9-11 Ribbon is a civil and military decoration of the U.S. Department of Transportation that was issued to both civilians and military personnel who, through service with the United States Department of Transportation, contributed to the recovery from the September 11 attacks in 2001 against the United States of America.

== History ==
The ribbon was issued primarily to the United States Coast Guard, but was also authorized for any Department of Transportation personnel, Merchant Marines, or civilians who were assigned to the Department of Transportation for relief efforts against the terrorist attacks.

The three main criteria for the award of the 9-11 Ribbon are as follows:

- Assignment to Coast Guard units that shifted Operational Control to Operation Enduring Freedom, Operation Noble Eagle, or Operation Protecting Liberty between September 11, 2001 and September 11, 2002.
- All personnel involved in patrolling harbors, critical infrastructure facilities, escorting high interest vessels, and conducting boardings of vessels entering U.S. waters during the period of September 11, 2001 to September 11, 2002. Participation in these operations must have been for no less than fourteen days.
- All personnel, to include active, reserve, auxiliary, and civilian personnel who manned or augmented for no less than fourteen days, Coast Guard, Department of Transportation, the Federal Emergency Management Agency (FEMA), and Department of Defense command centers between September 11, 2001 and September 11, 2002.

The 9-11 Ribbon was awarded as a one time decoration and there were no devices authorized to the decoration. The 9-11 Ribbon was discontinued in October 2002, but permitted for continued wear on Coast Guard uniforms and by civilian personnel.

For individual acts of bravery and heroism, above and beyond the criteria for the 9-11 Ribbon, the Department of Transportation also issued the 9-11 Medal.

== See also ==
- Awards and decorations of the United States government
