= Badges of the United States Coast Guard =

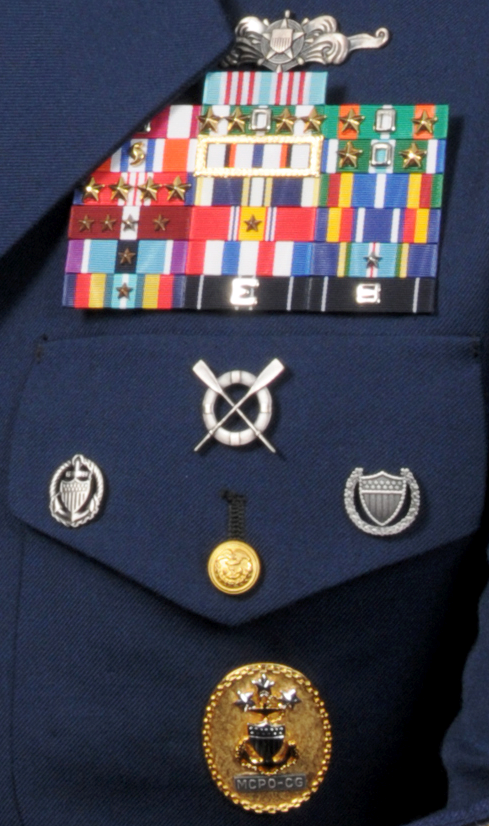
U.S. Coast Guard ribbons and badges as shown on the uniform of former Master Chief Petty Officer of the Coast Guard Michael Leavitt

Badges of the United States Coast Guard are issued by the Department of Homeland Security to members of the United States Coast Guard to denote certain qualifications, achievements, and postings to certain assignments. Prior to 2002, the issuance of such badges was under the authority of the United States Department of Transportation.

In addition to the U.S. Coast Guard badges listed below, uniform regulations also authorize the wear of some specific U.S. Navy insignia as well as some Department of Defense and Executive Branch Identification badges.

The following are the current U.S. Coast Guard and U.S. Coast Guard Auxiliary badges authorized for wear on the Coast Guard uniform:

== Aviation ==
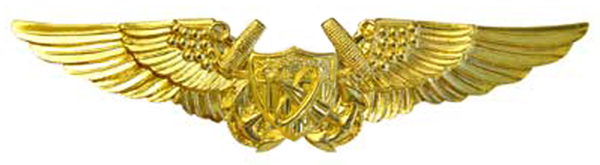
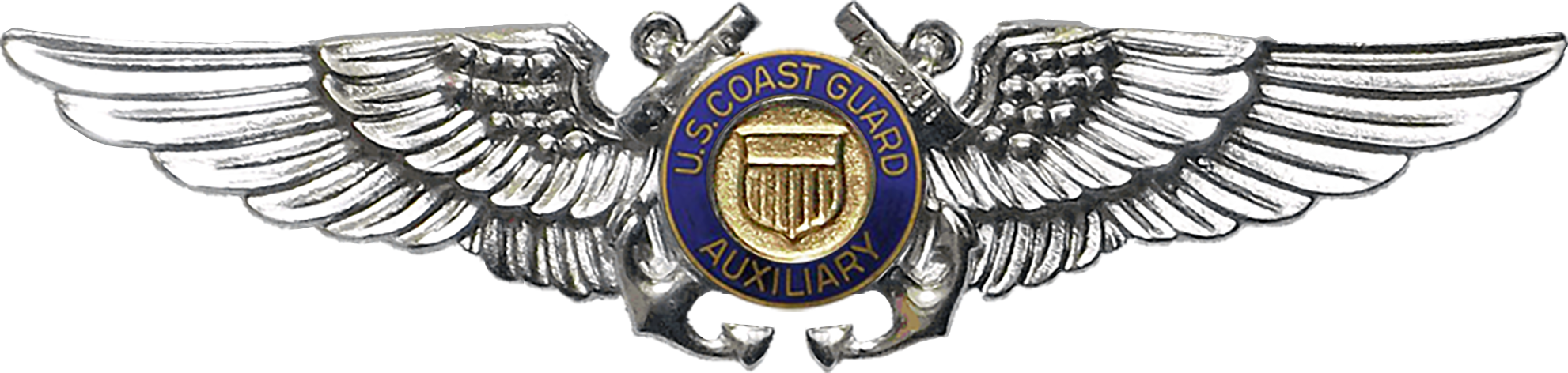
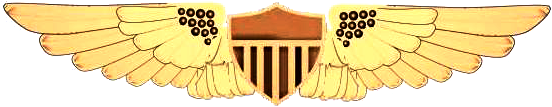
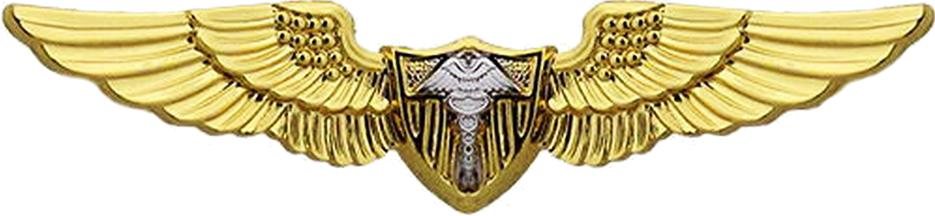
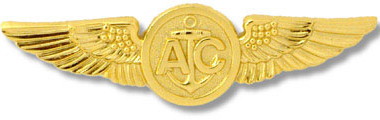
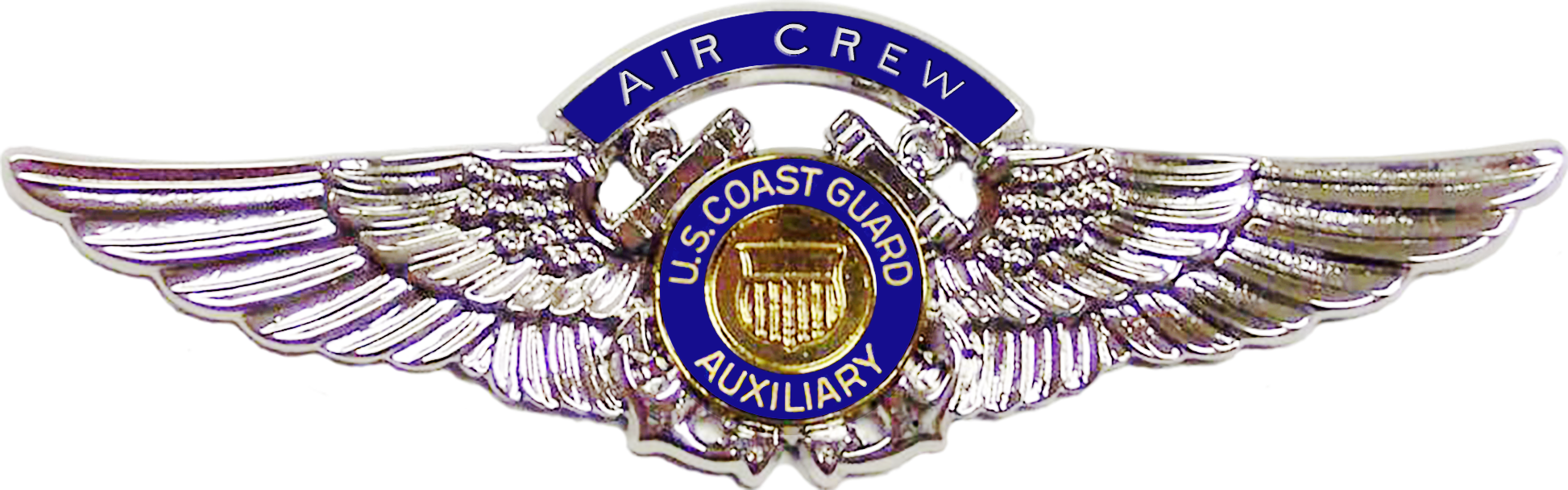
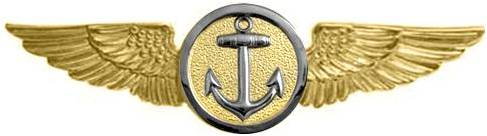
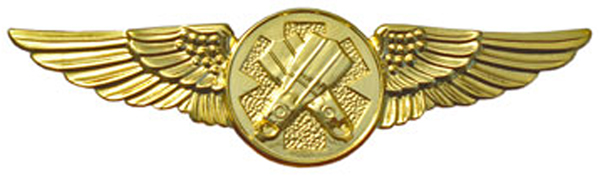
Astronaut Badge**
Aviator Badge**
Aviator Badge - USCG Auxiliary
Flight Officer Badge (no longer awarded but still authorized for wear)
Flight Surgeon Badge
Aircrew Badge**
Aircrew Badge - USCG Auxiliary
Aviation Mission Specialist Badge**
Aviation Rescue Swimmer Badge

== Qualification Insignia ==
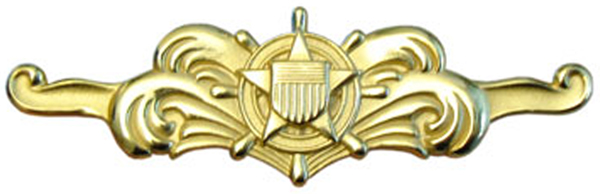
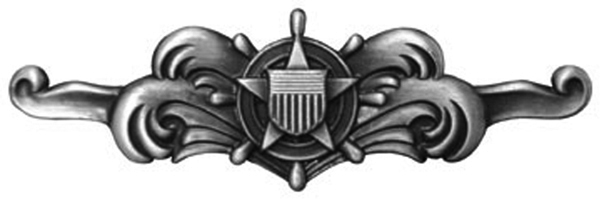
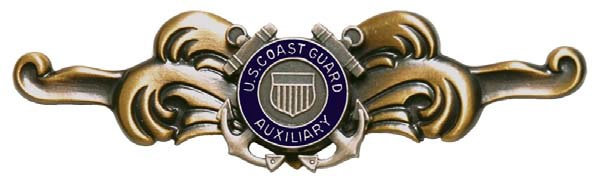
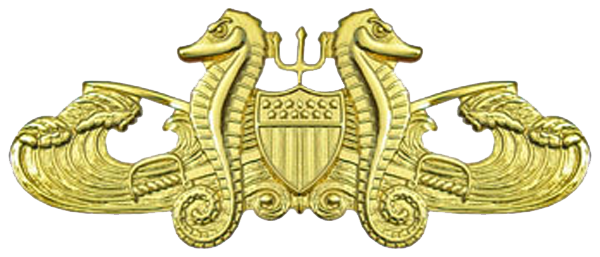
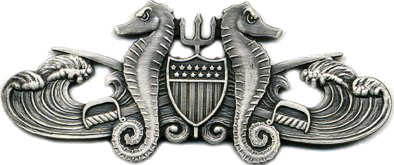
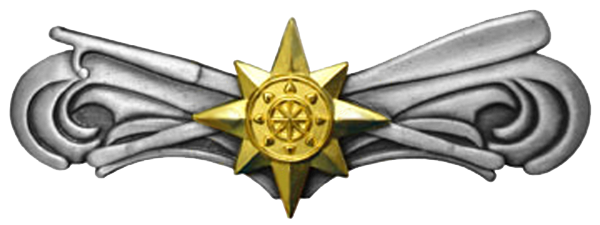
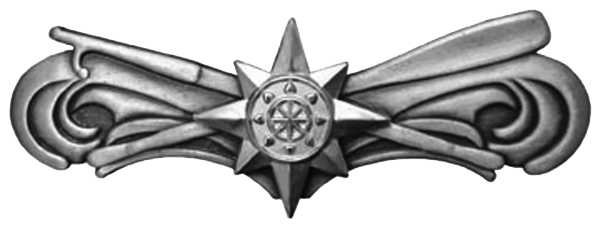
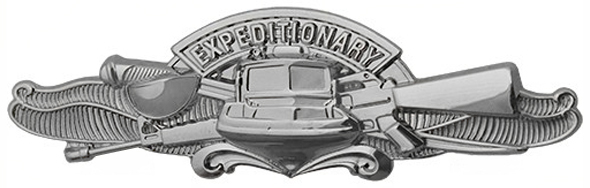
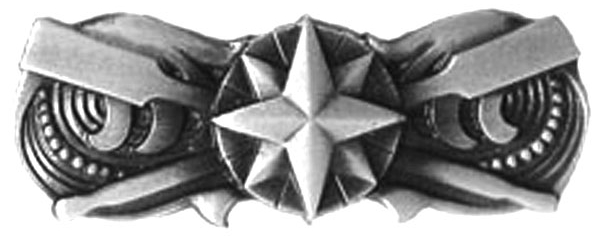
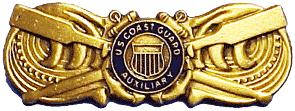
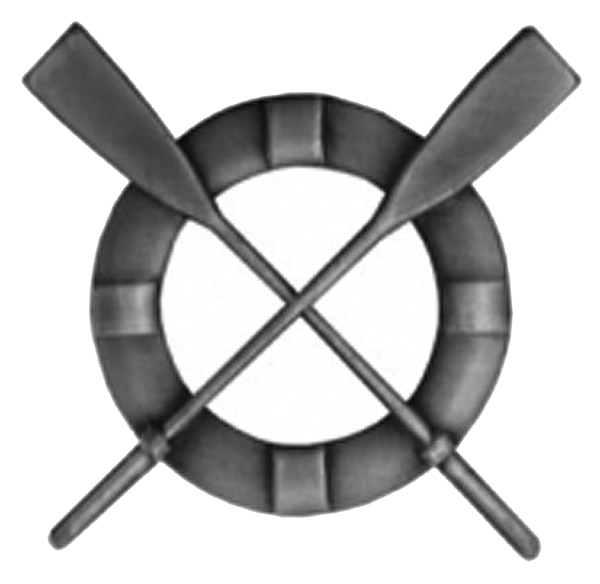
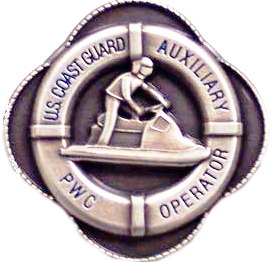
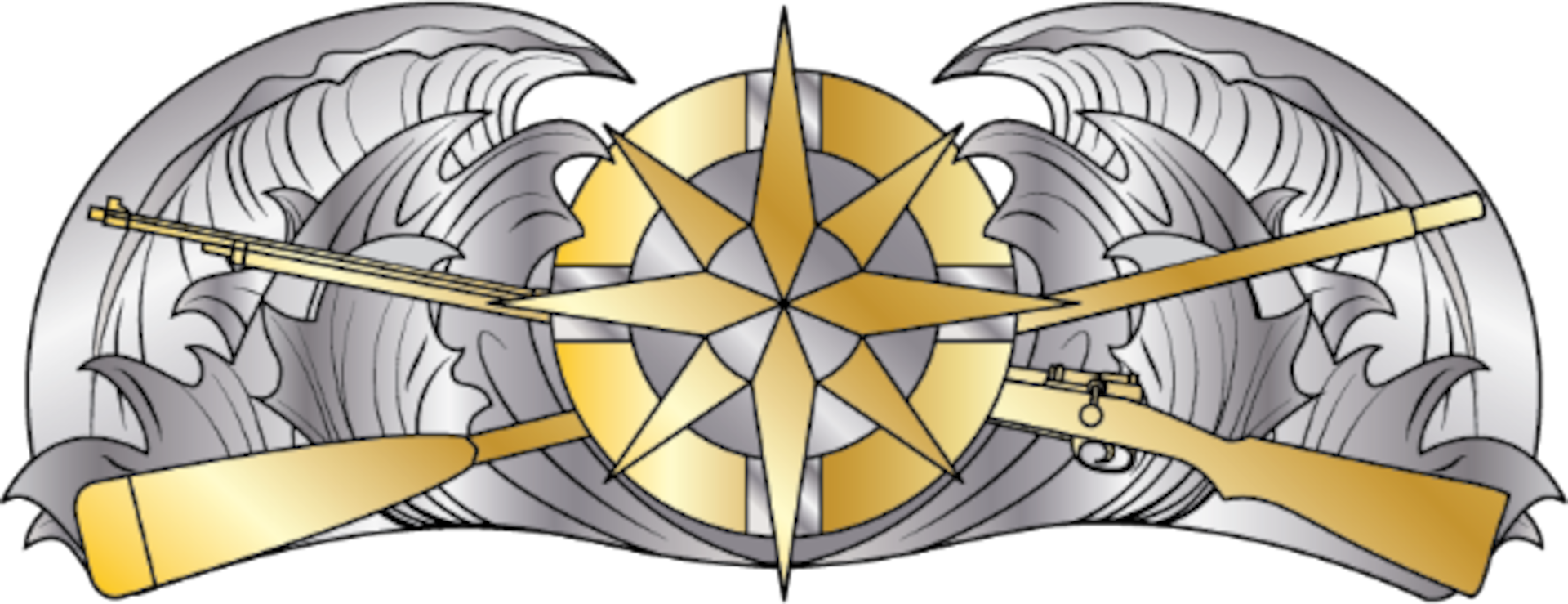
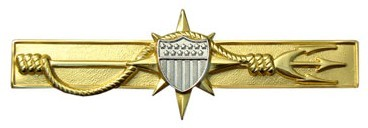
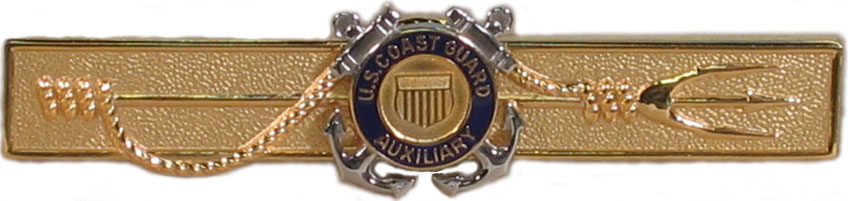
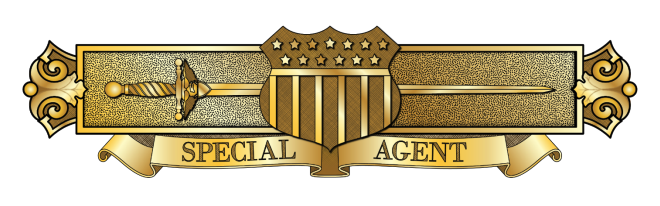
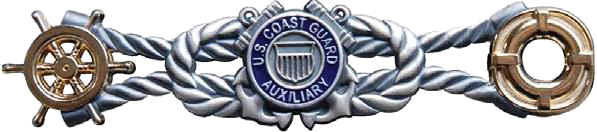
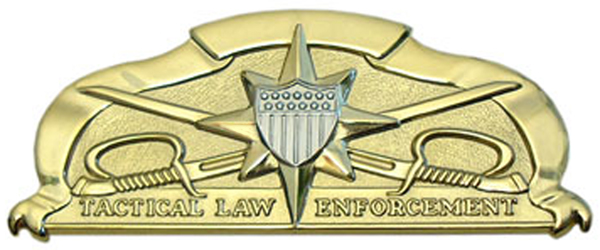
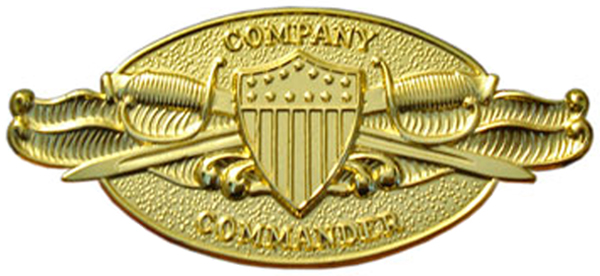
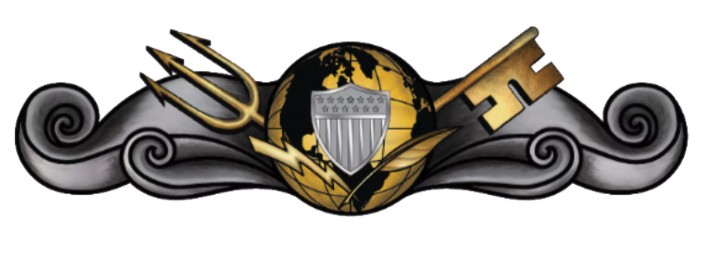
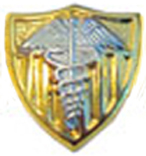
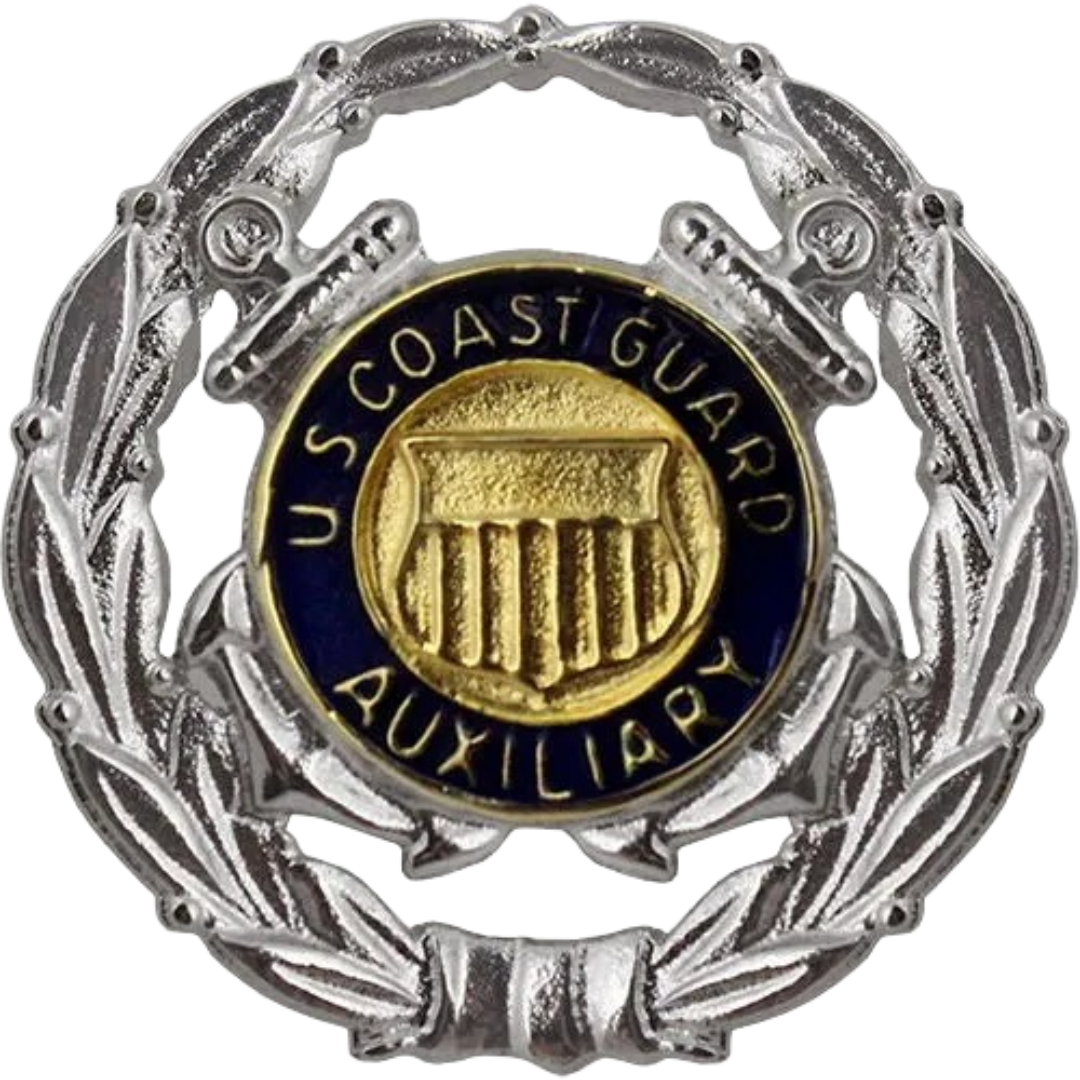
Cutterman Insignia - Officer
Cutterman Insignia - Enlisted
Cutterman Insignia - USCG Auxiliary
Port Security Officer Pin
Port Security Enlisted Pin
Advanced Boat Force Operations Insignia
Boat Force Operations Insignia
Expeditionary Warfare Specialist Insignia*
Coxswain Insignia
Coxswain Insignia - USCG Auxiliary
Surfman Badge
Personal Watercraft Operator - USCG Auxiliary
Response Operations Ashore Insignia
Prevention Operations Ashore Insignia
Marine Safety Insignia - USCG Auxiliary
Special Agent Insignia
Recreational Boating Safety Insignia - USCG Auxiliary
Tactical Law Enforcement Badge
Company Commander Insignia
Intelligence Professional Insignia
Cyberspace Qualification Insignia
Physician Assistant and Nurse Practitioner Badge
Operational Auxiliarist Device - USCG Auxiliary

== Diving Badges ==
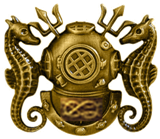
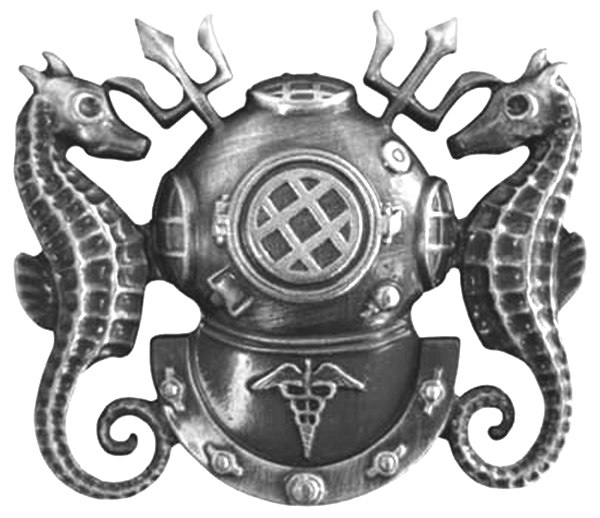
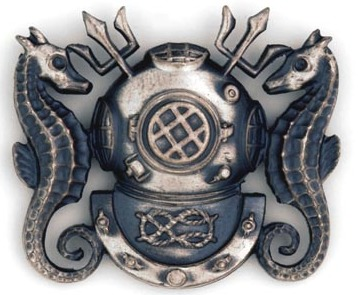
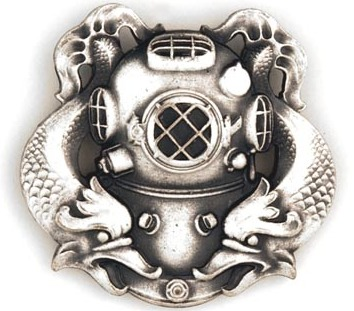
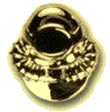
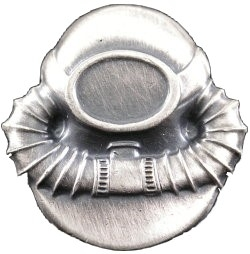
Diving Officer Badge*
Diving Medical Technician Badge*
Master Diver Badge**
First Class Diver Badge**
Second Class Diver Badge**
Scuba Diver Officer Badge
Scuba Diver Badge**

== Command Identification Badges ==
Command Afloat Pin
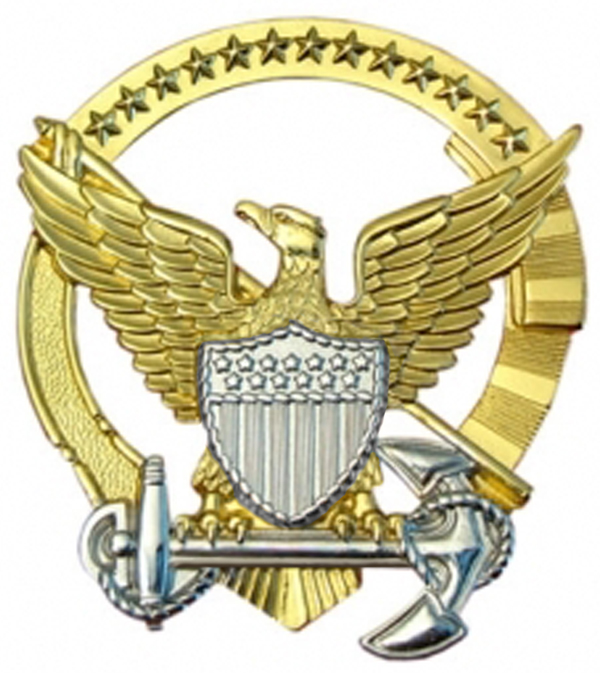

Command Ashore Pin
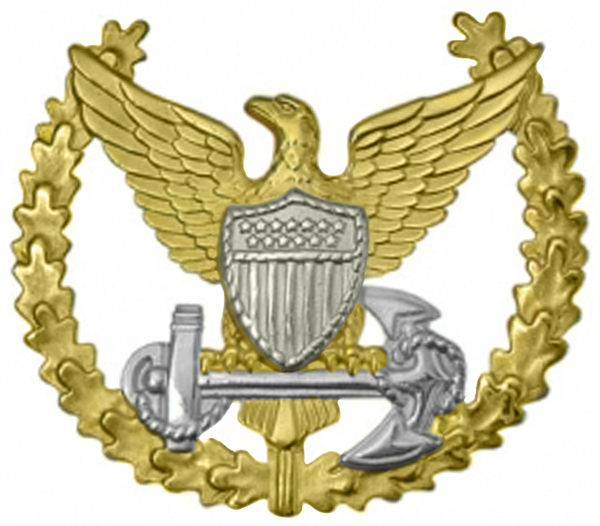

Officer-in-Charge Afloat Pin
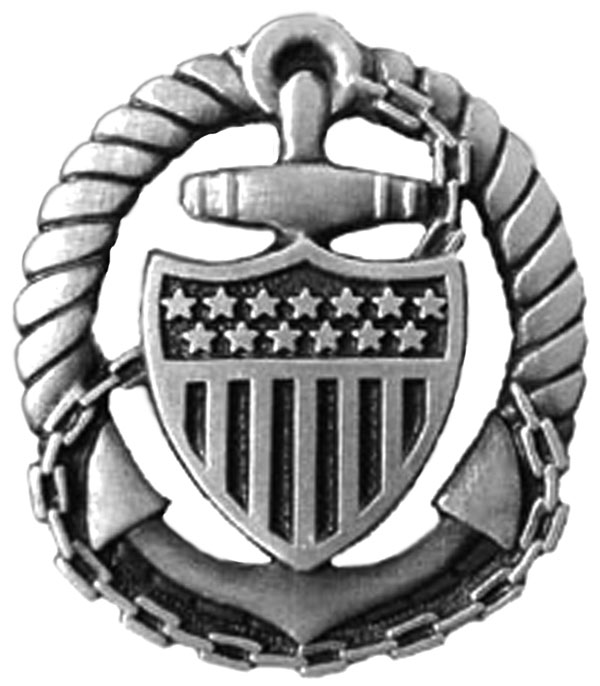

Officer-in-Charge Ashore Pin
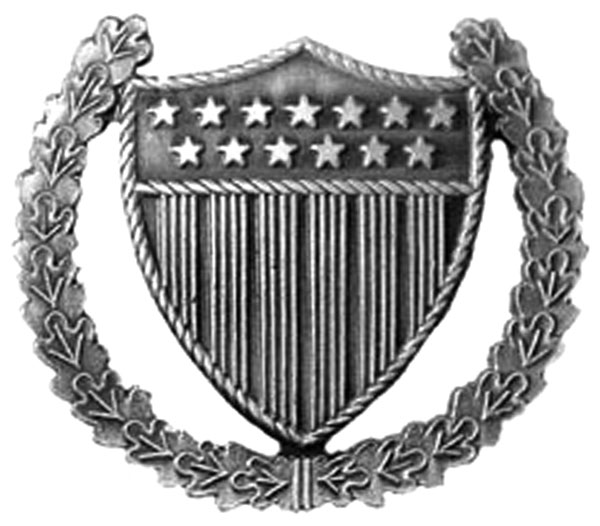

Commandant-designated Command Senior Enlisted Leader Identification Badges
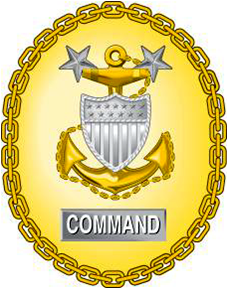

Non-designated Command Senior Enlisted Leader Identification Badges
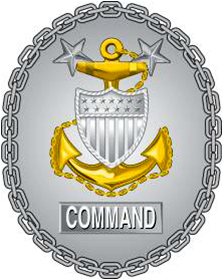
USCG Auxiliary Past Officer Badge

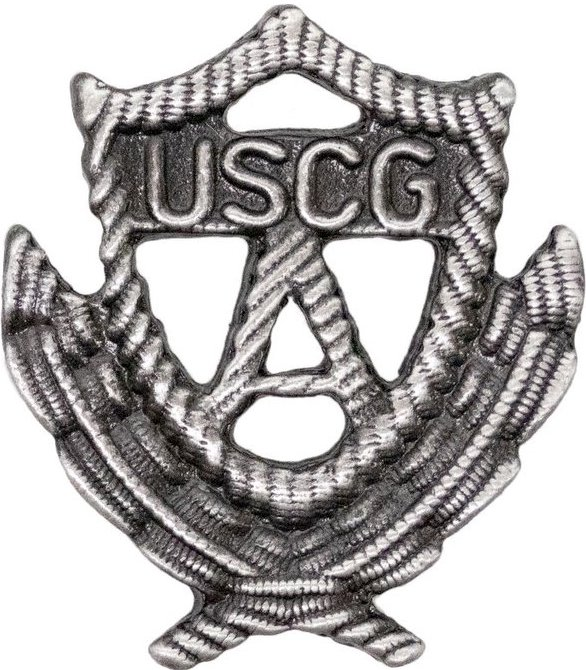

== Service Identification Badges ==
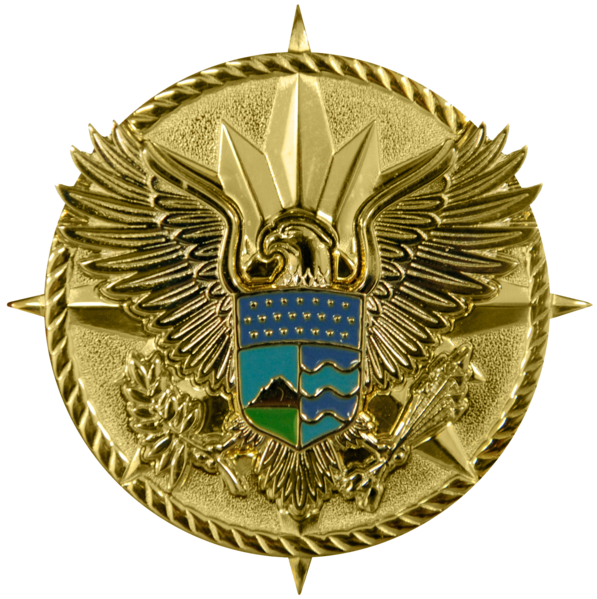
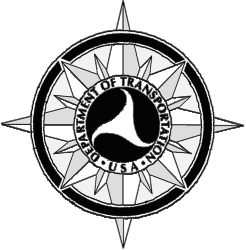
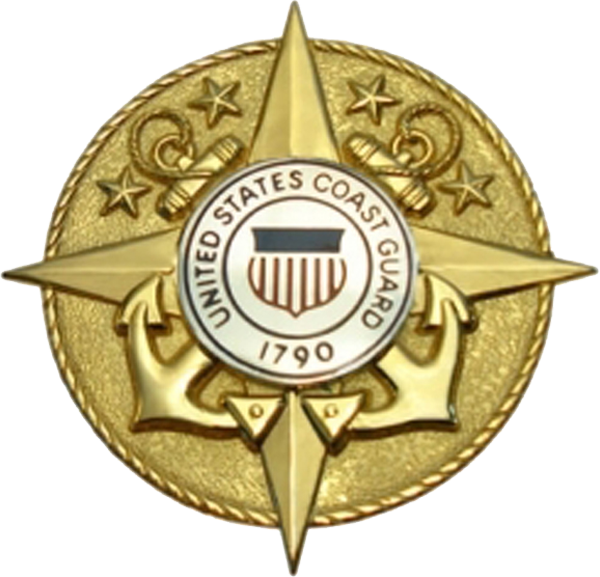
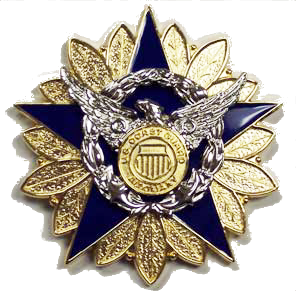
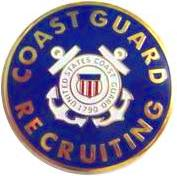
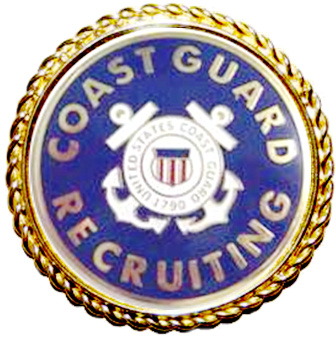
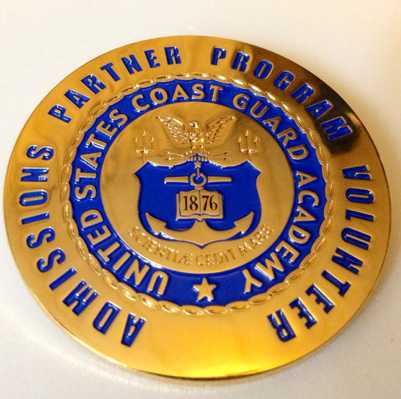
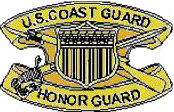
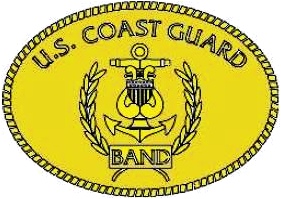
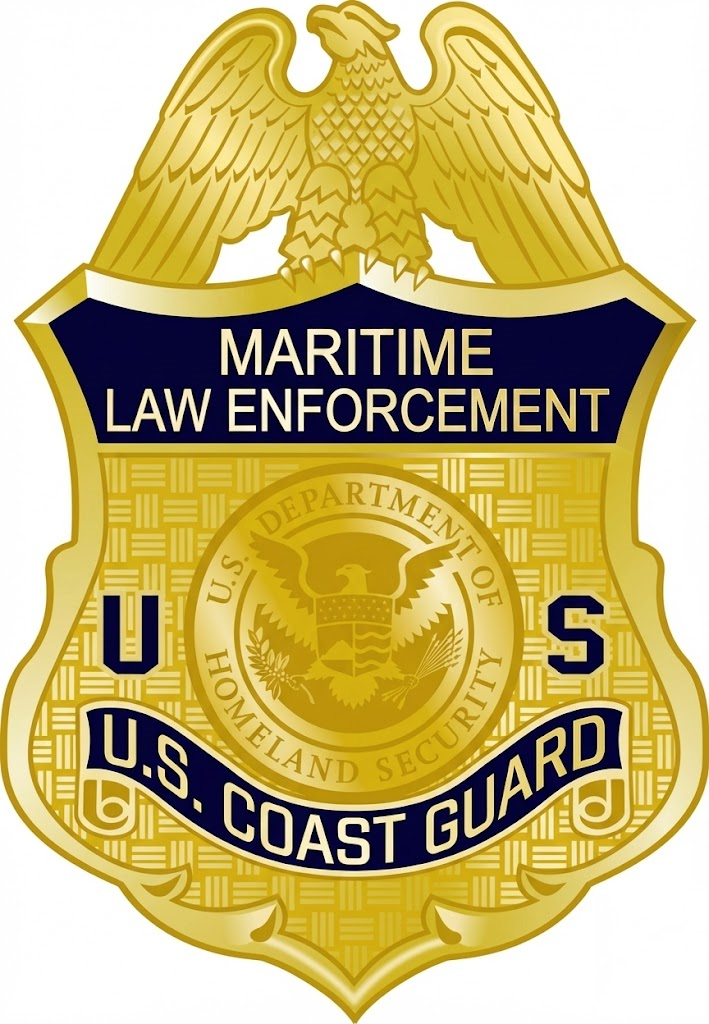
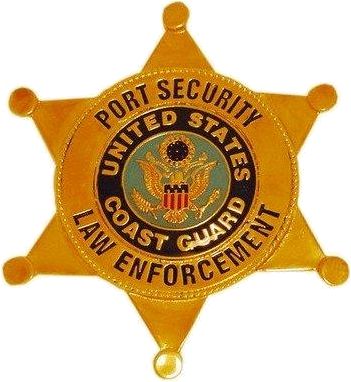
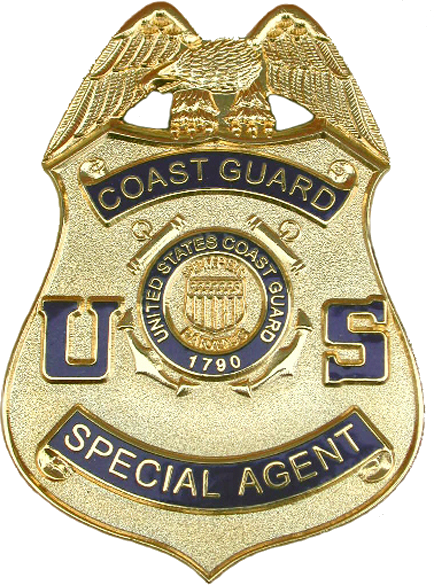
Office of the Secretary of Homeland Security Identification Badge
Office of the Secretary of Transportation Identification Badge (no longer awarded but still authorized for wear)
Commandant Staff Badge
National Staff Identification Badge - USCG Auxiliary
Coast Guard Recruiting Badge
U.S. Coast Guard Academy Admissions Partner Program Volunteer Badge
Coast Guard Honor Guard Badge
Coast Guard Band Badge
Coast Guard Maritime Law Enforcement Badge
Coast Guard Port Security Law Enforcement Badge
Coast Guard Special Agent Badge

== Marksmanship Competition Badges ==
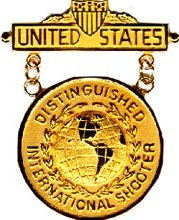
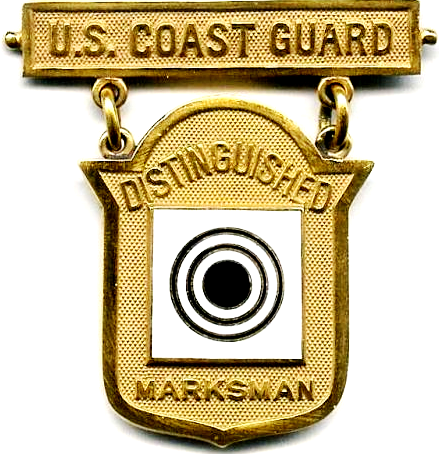
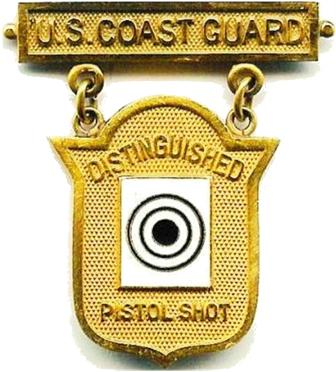
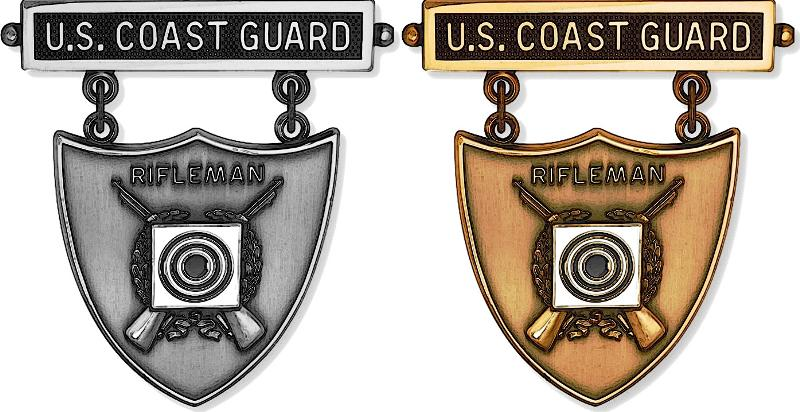
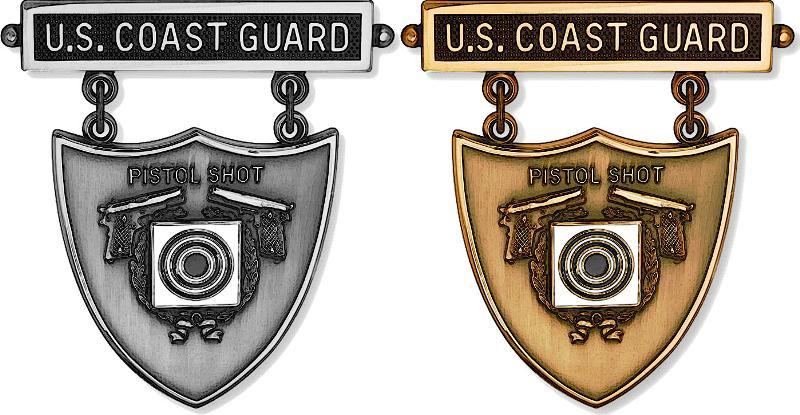
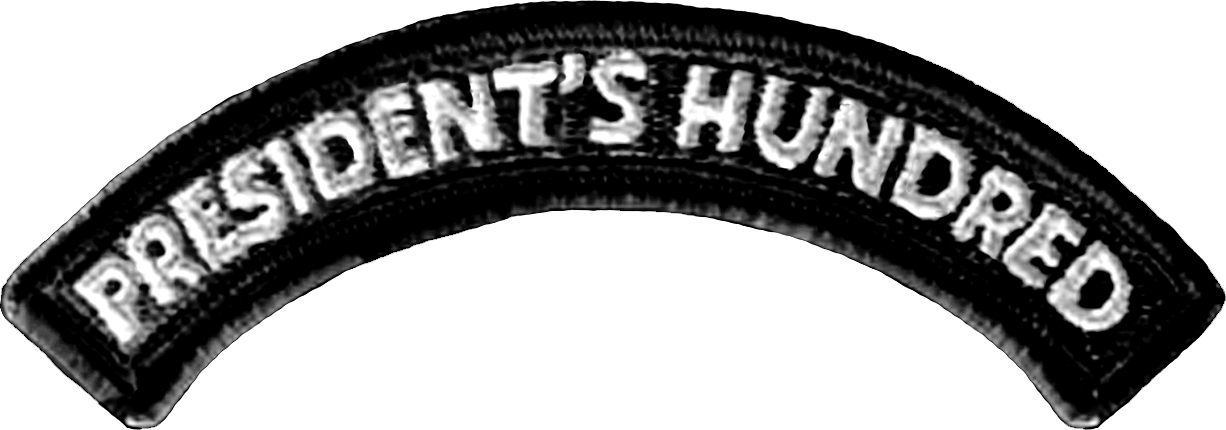
Distinguished International Shooter Badge**
Coast Guard Distinguished Marksman Badge
Coast Guard Distinguished Pistol Shot Badge
Coast Guard Rifleman Excellence-In-Competition Badges: Rifleman EIC Badges awarded at national competitions have the word "NATIONAL" embossed at the base of the shield
Coast Guard Pistol Shot Excellence-In-Competition Badges: Pistol Shot EIC Badges awarded at national competitions have the word "NATIONAL" embossed at the base of the shield
President's Hundred Tab

== Notes ==
- * = also issued to Navy sailors
- ** = also issued to sailors and marines
- No asterisk indicates that the badge is issued only to coast guardsmen

== See also ==
- Military badges of the United States
- Identification badges of the United States military
- Obsolete badges of the United States military
- List of United States Coast Guard ratings
- Uniforms of the United States Coast Guard
