= Marine Science Technician =

Enlisted rate in the US Coast Guard

USCG Marine Science Technician rating badge

Marine Science Technician (MST) is an enlisted rate in the United States Coast Guard. They are specialists in enforcing Federal Maritime Laws for Marine Safety, Marine Security, and Environmental Protection .

== Typical Duties ==
- Commercial Vessel Inspections Boarding and examining foreign flagged commercial ships via Port State Control Inspections to ensure compliance with international and federal regulations covering lifesaving equipment, safety, pollution control, operations, prevention of introduction of invasive species, and crew welfare. Domestic vessel inspections including fishing vessels, passenger vessels, and cruise ships.
- Waterfront Facility Safety and Security - Conduct safety and security inspections of waterfront facilities such as cargo terminals, refineries, and passenger ferry/cruise terminals, to prevent accidental and intentional disruptions in the maritime community.
- Pollution Response and Prevention - Investigation and response to marine oil spills and chemical releases to determine responsibility and contain the spill. Manage multi-agency responses and notifications, and provide oversight during the cleanup of these spills. To prevent future spills, MSTs work with industries to create contingency plans to protect nearby sensitive wildlife areas from potential spills.
- Marine Casualty Investigations - Investigate vessel incidents that result in loss of life, serious injuries, oil spills, hazmat spills, or high levels of property damage.
- Disaster Response - During and after disasters such as the Deepwater Horizon Oil Spill, Golden Ray incident, Francis Scott Key Bridge collapse, or a major Hurricane, MSTs are deployed to respond to environmental emergencies, ensure maritime safety, coordinate federal agency response, and manage waterway/port recovery.
- Container Inspections - Shipping container examinations and searches at ports. Enforce shipping laws for hazardous material compatibility and reactivity in containers.
- Waterways Management - Management of waterway usage for events and during times of disaster.
- Explosives Handling - Oversight and management of explosives loading at shipping ports
- Boarding Team Member - Boarding vessels for law enforcement purposes
- Other standard Coast Guard duties - An MST will be assigned to standard Coast Guard duties as required by the operational tempo of the unit the member is assigned to.
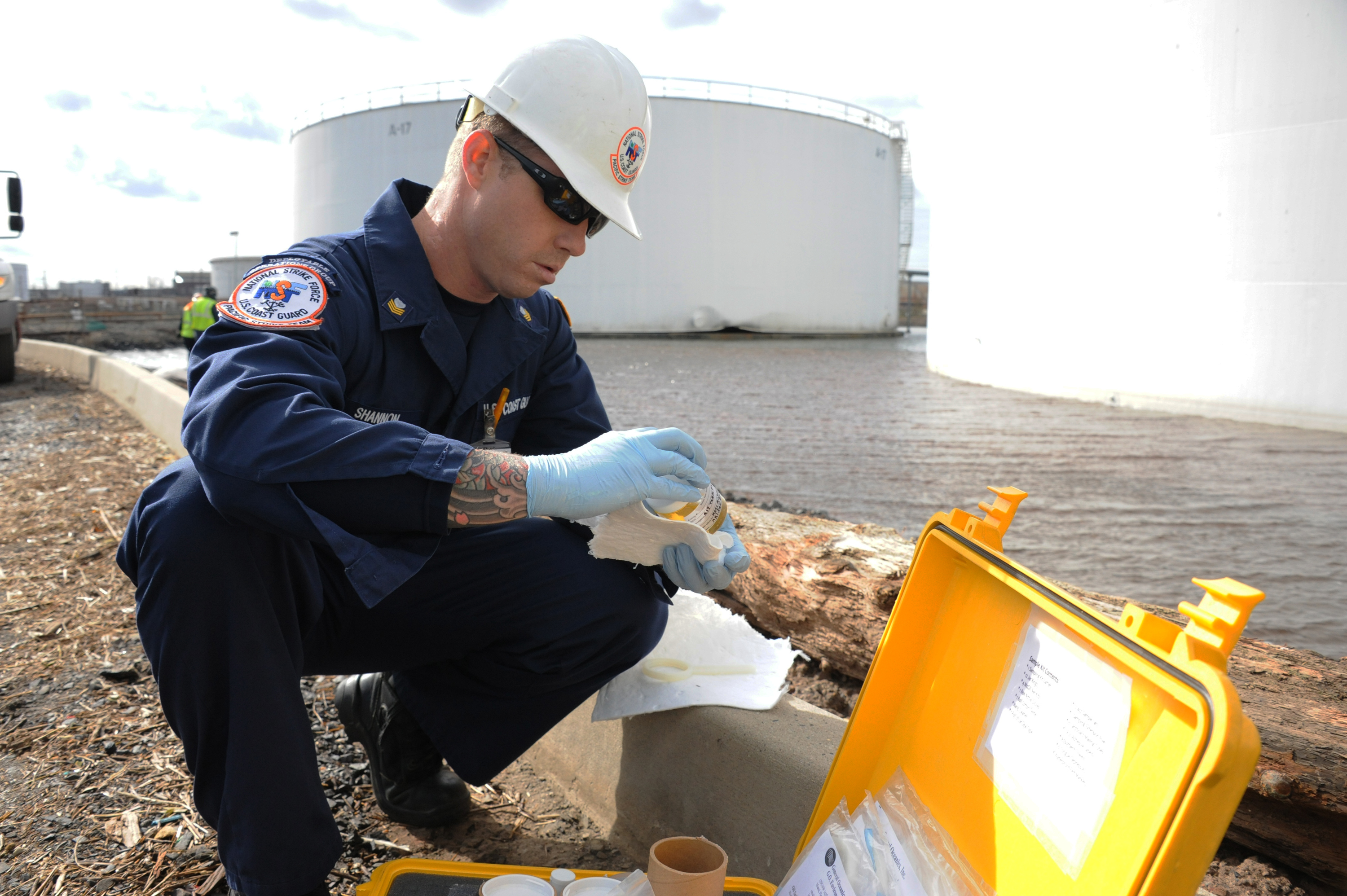

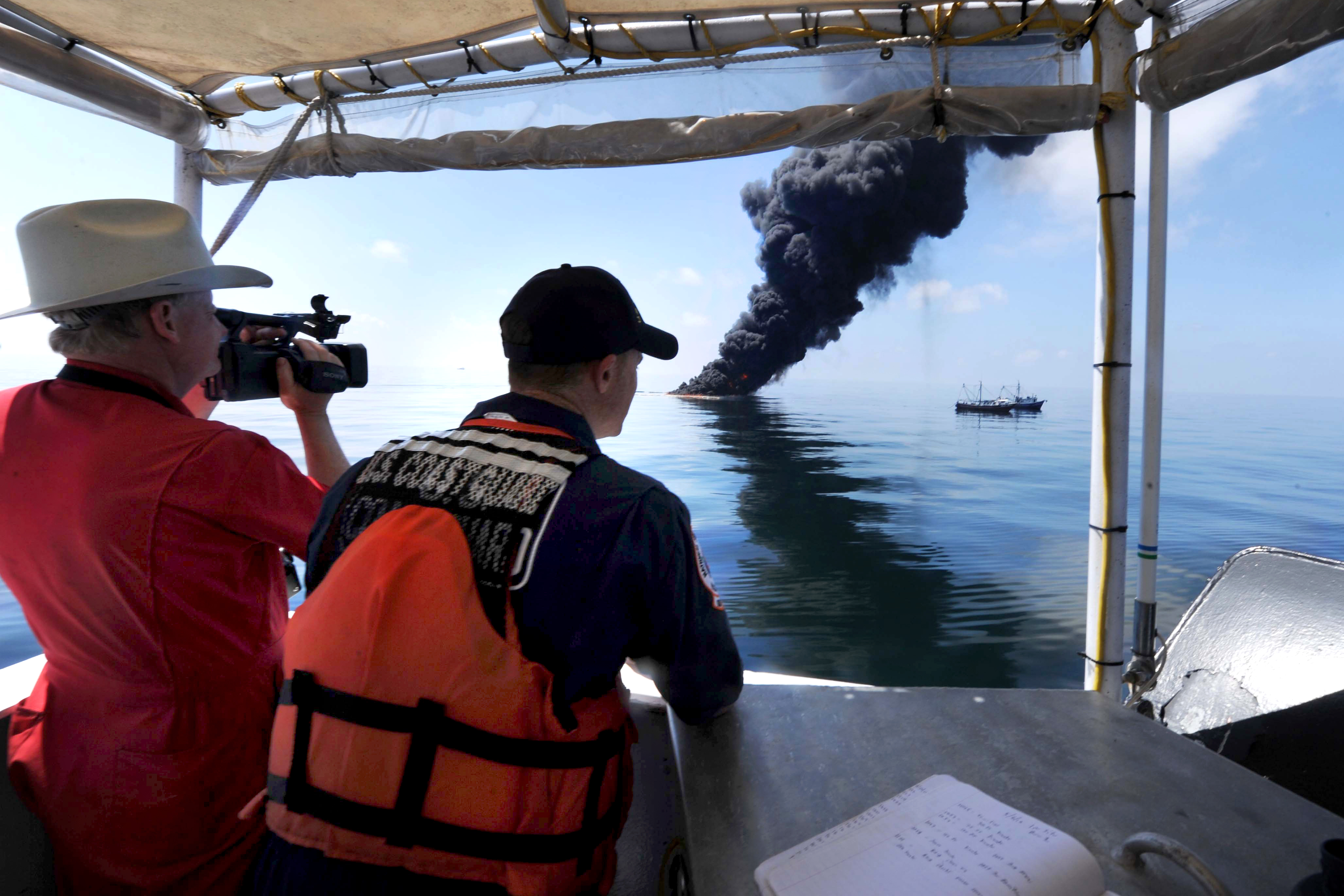

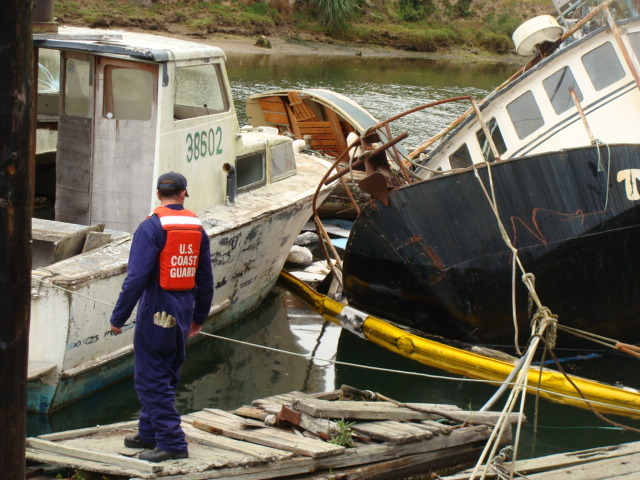

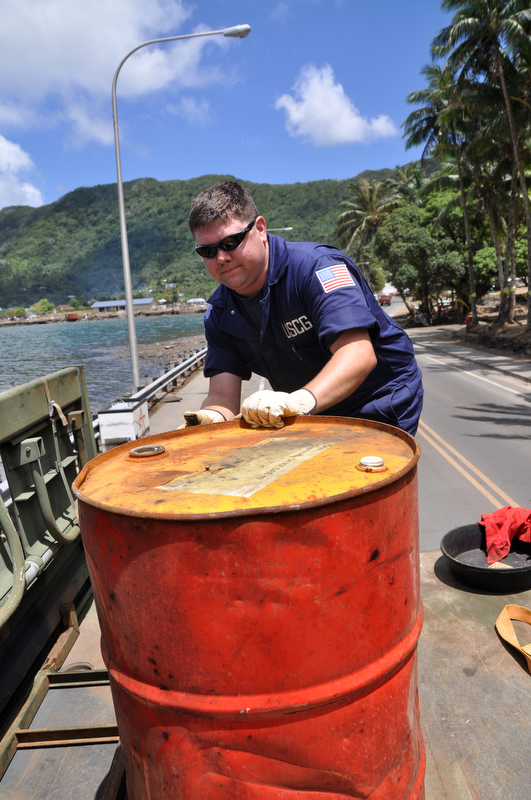

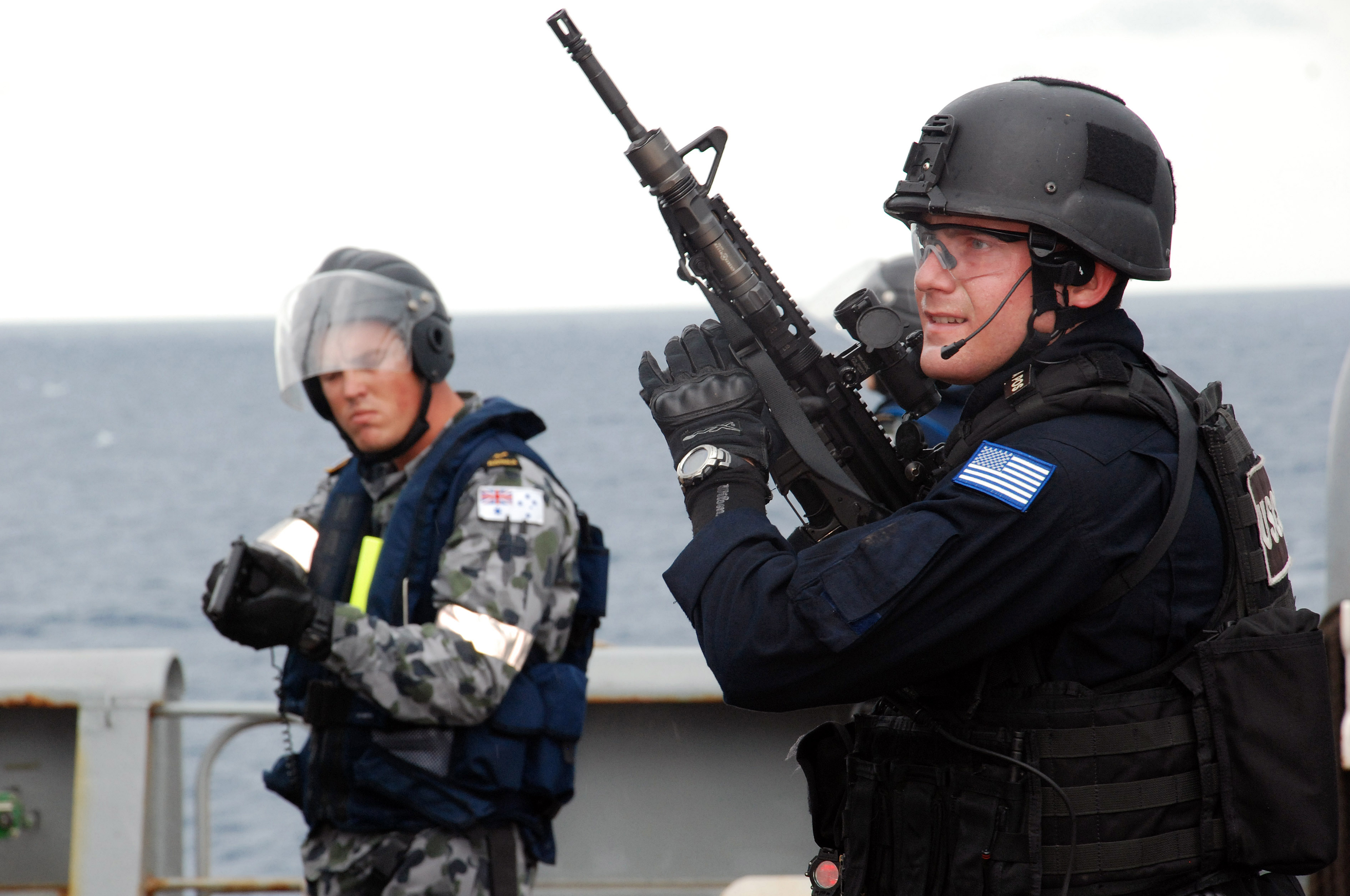

.

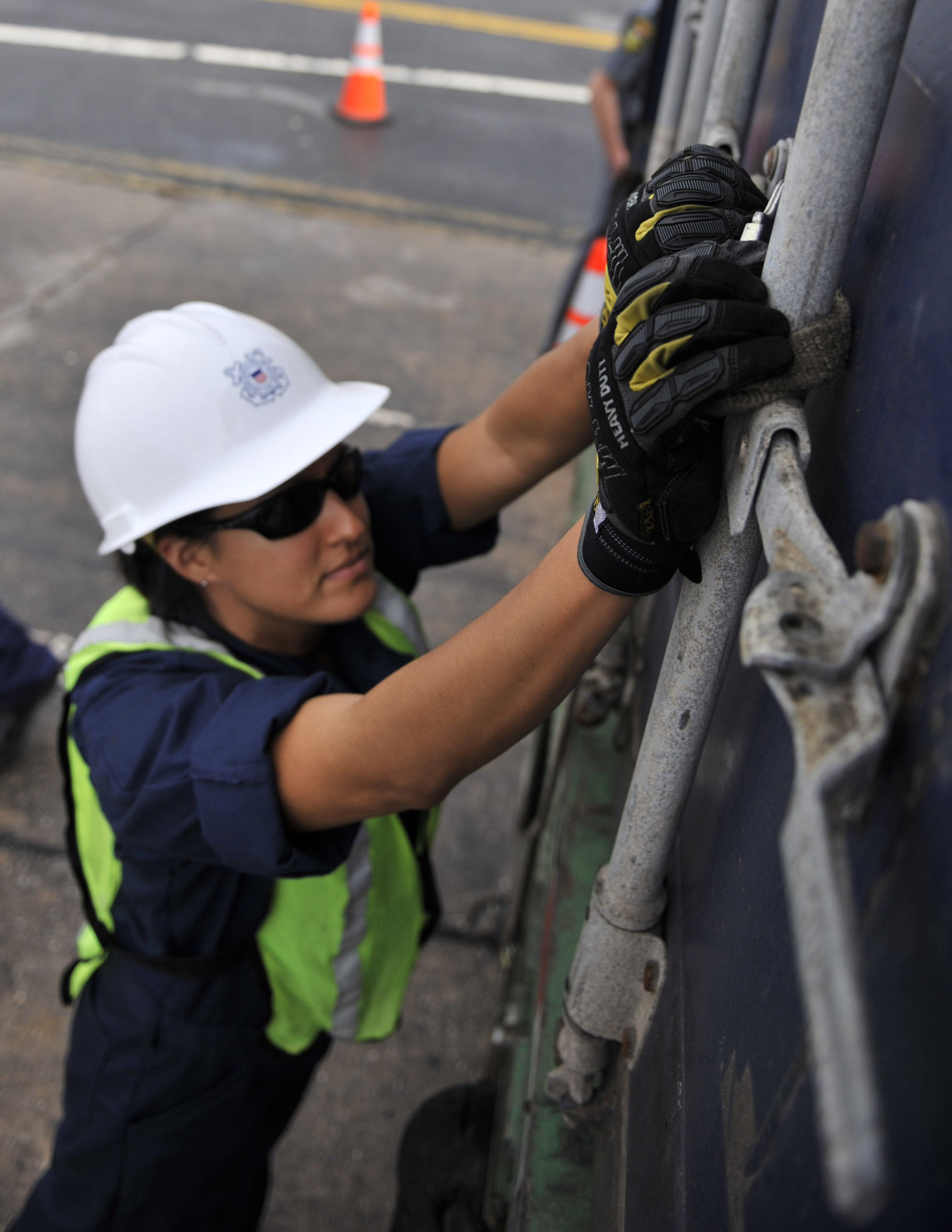

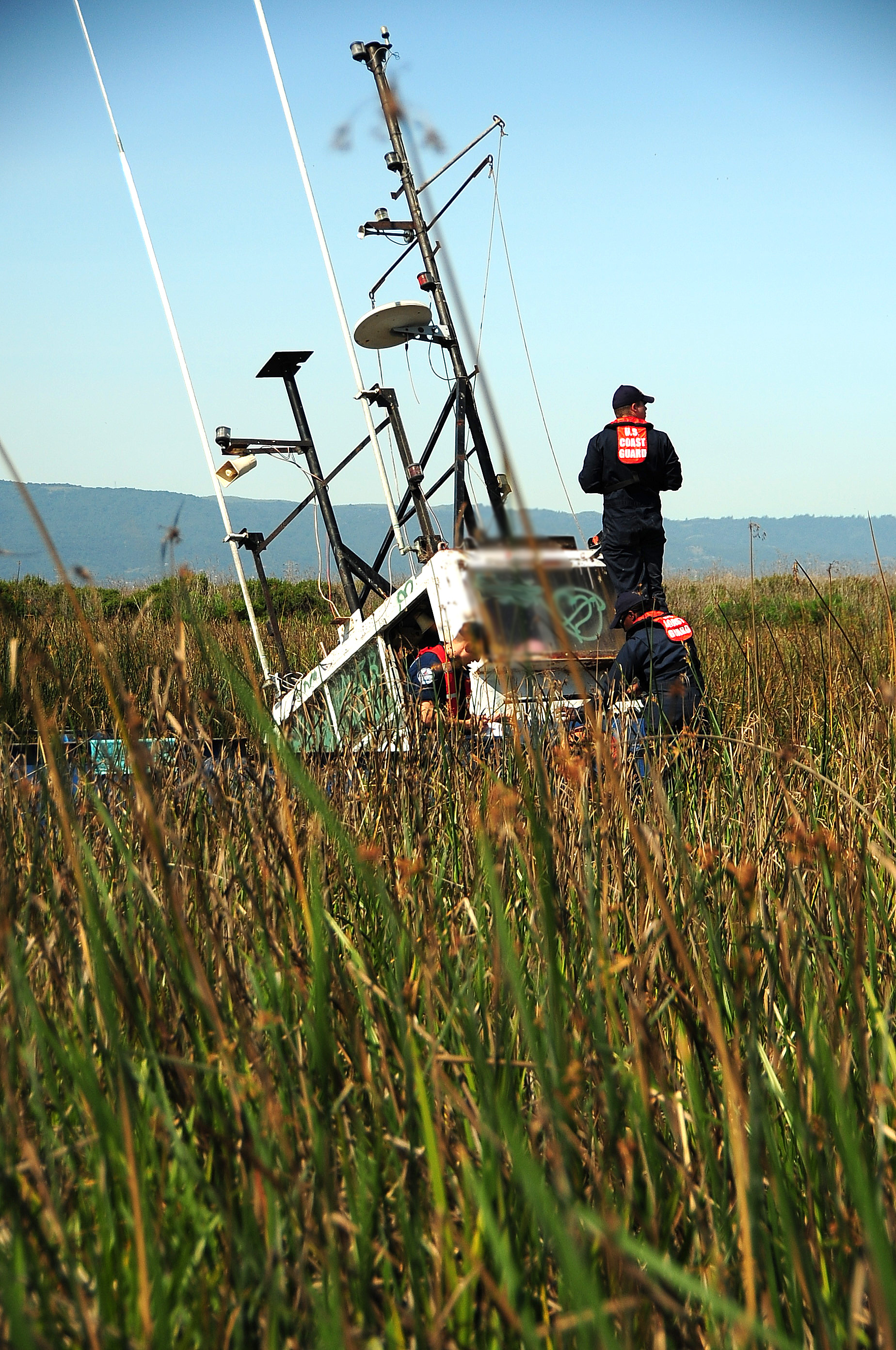

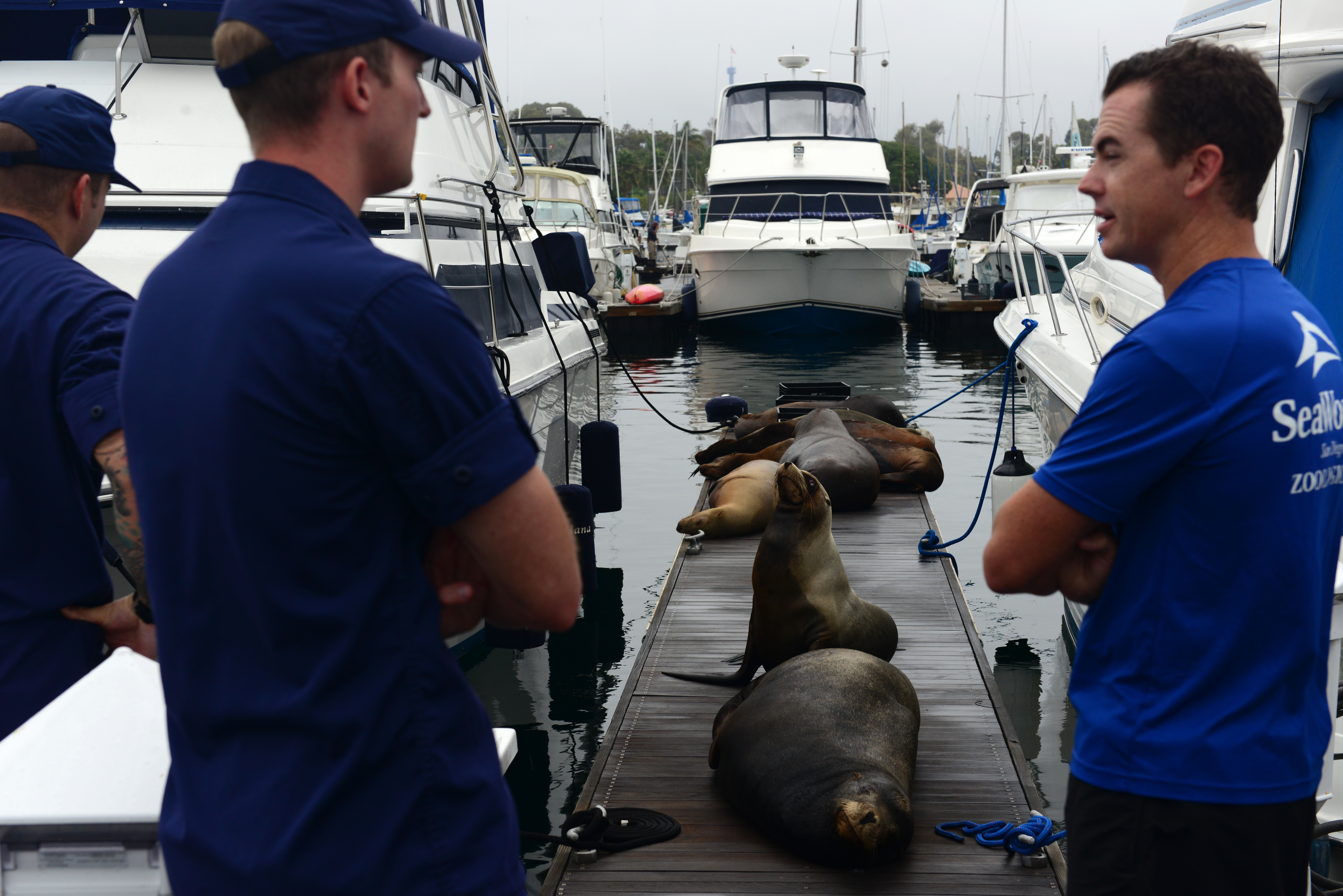

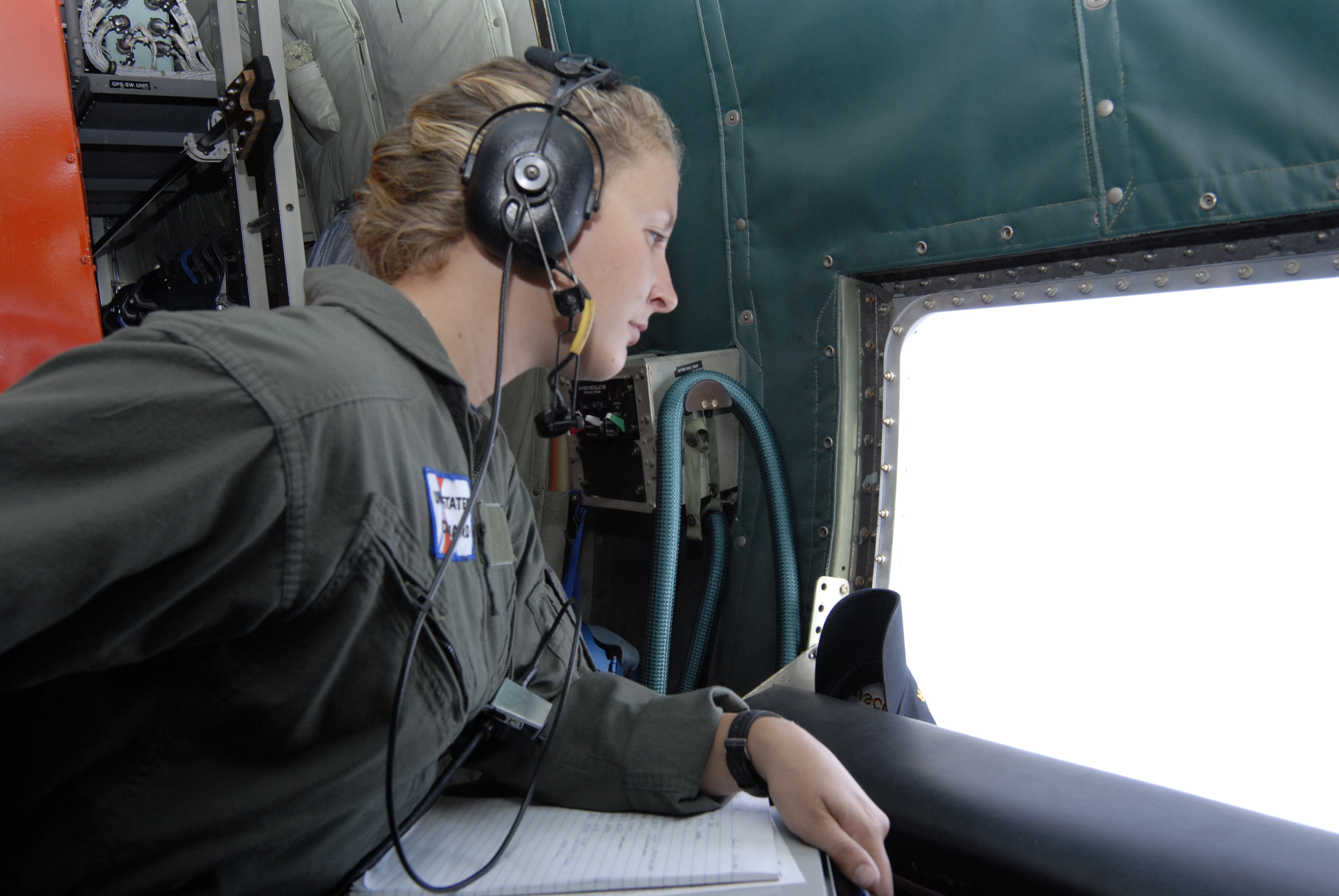

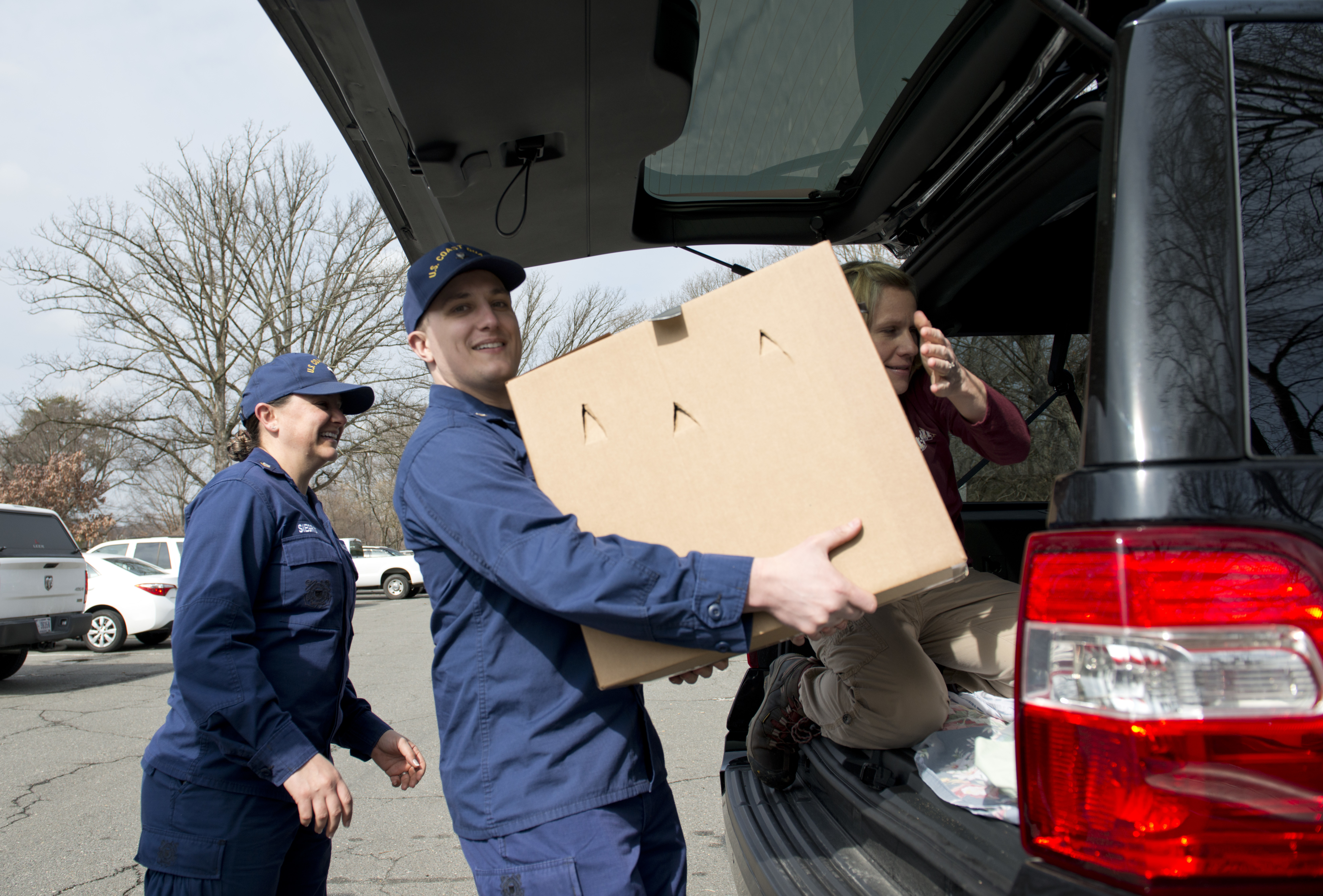
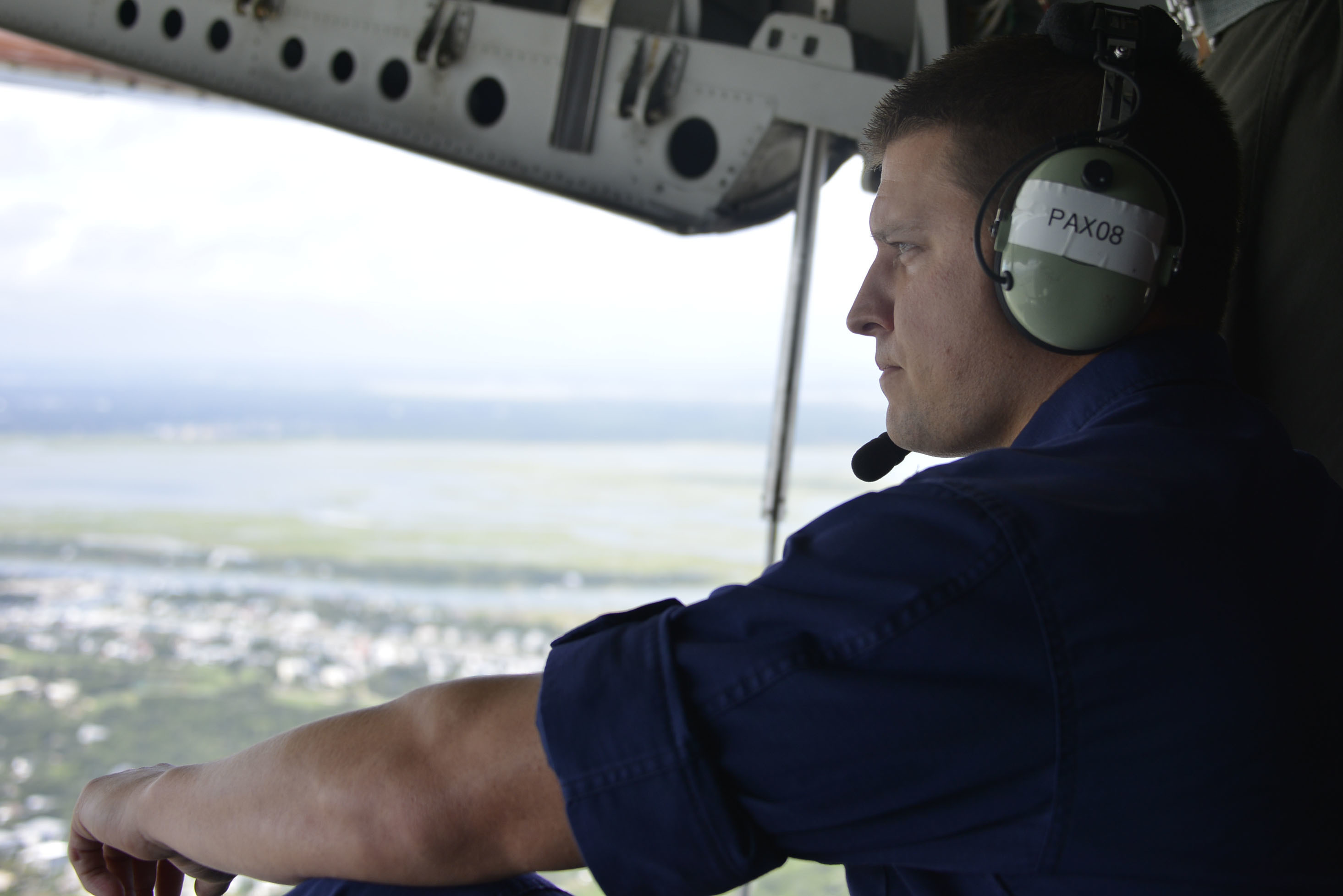

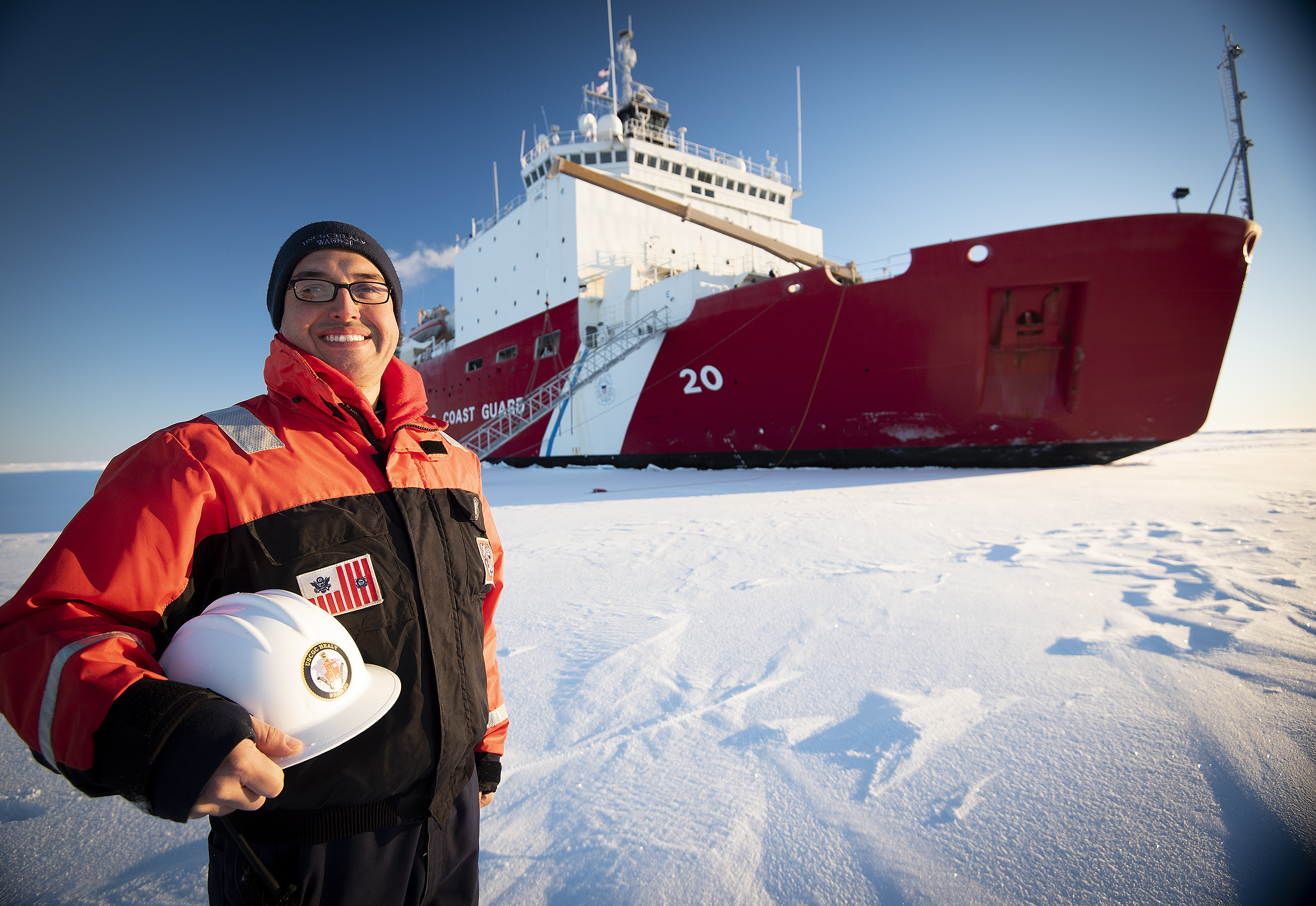

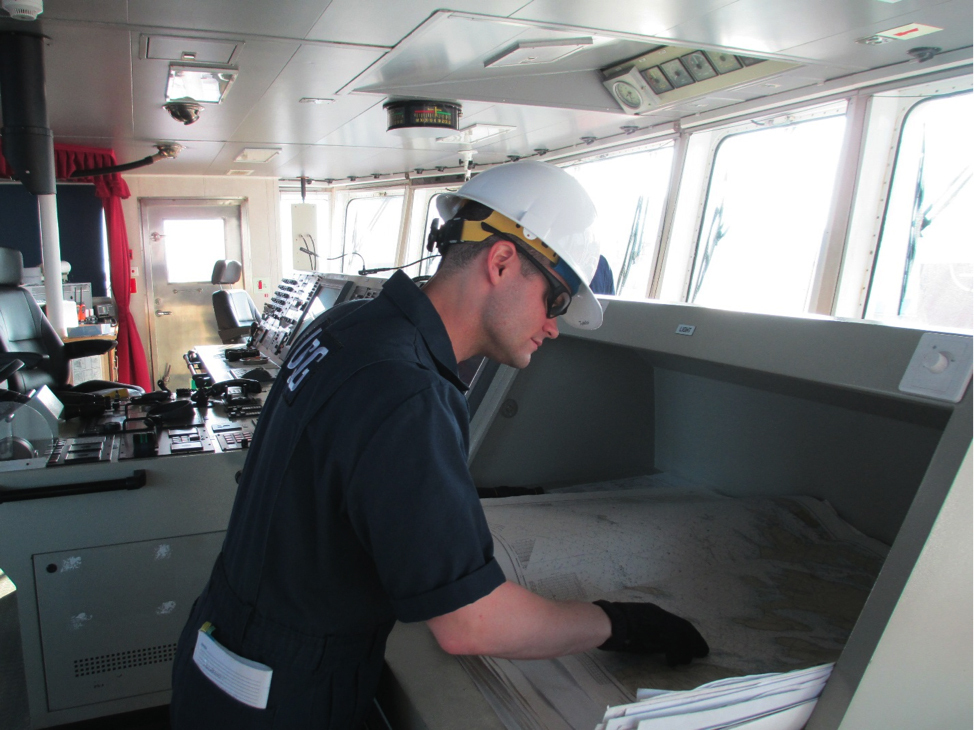

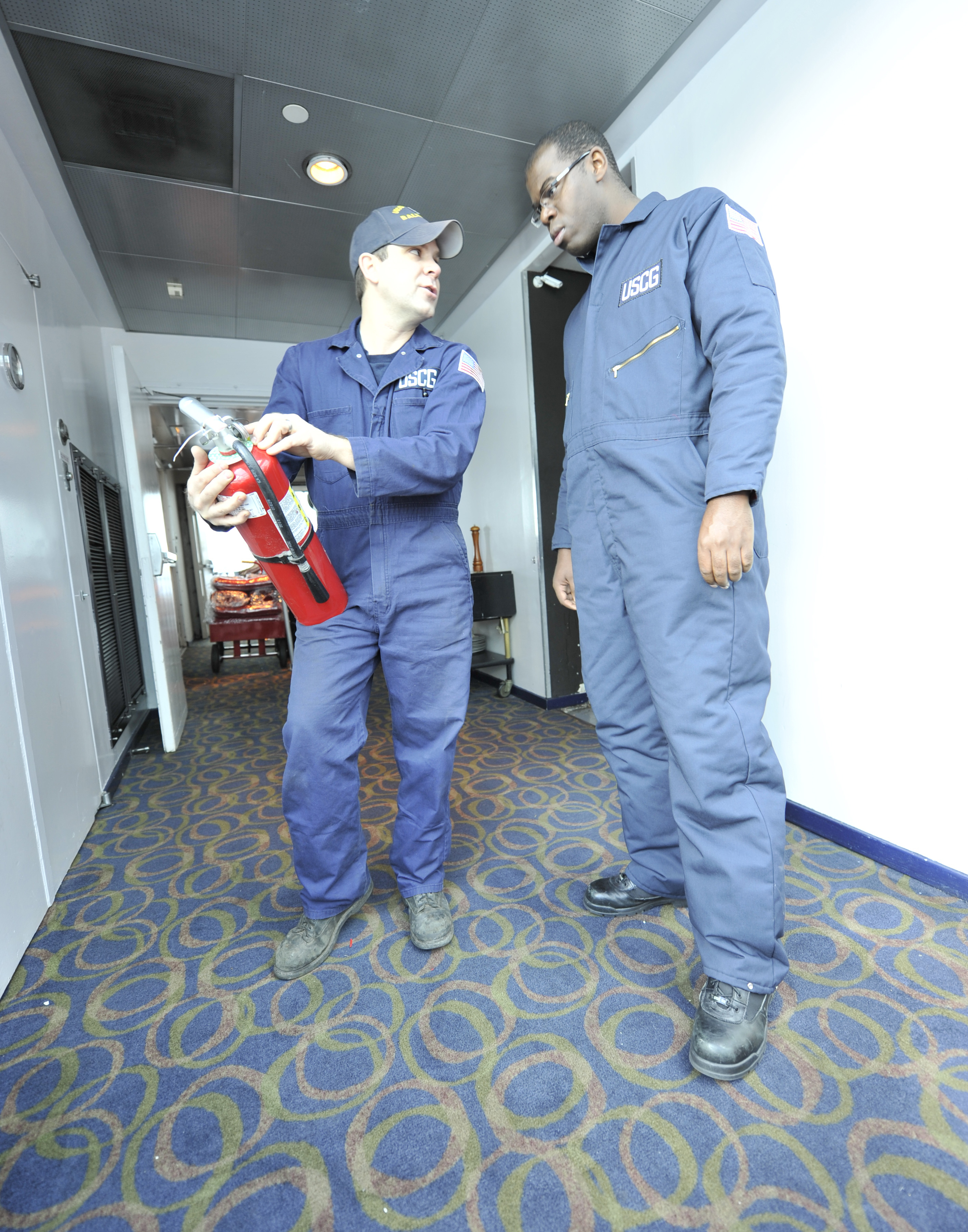

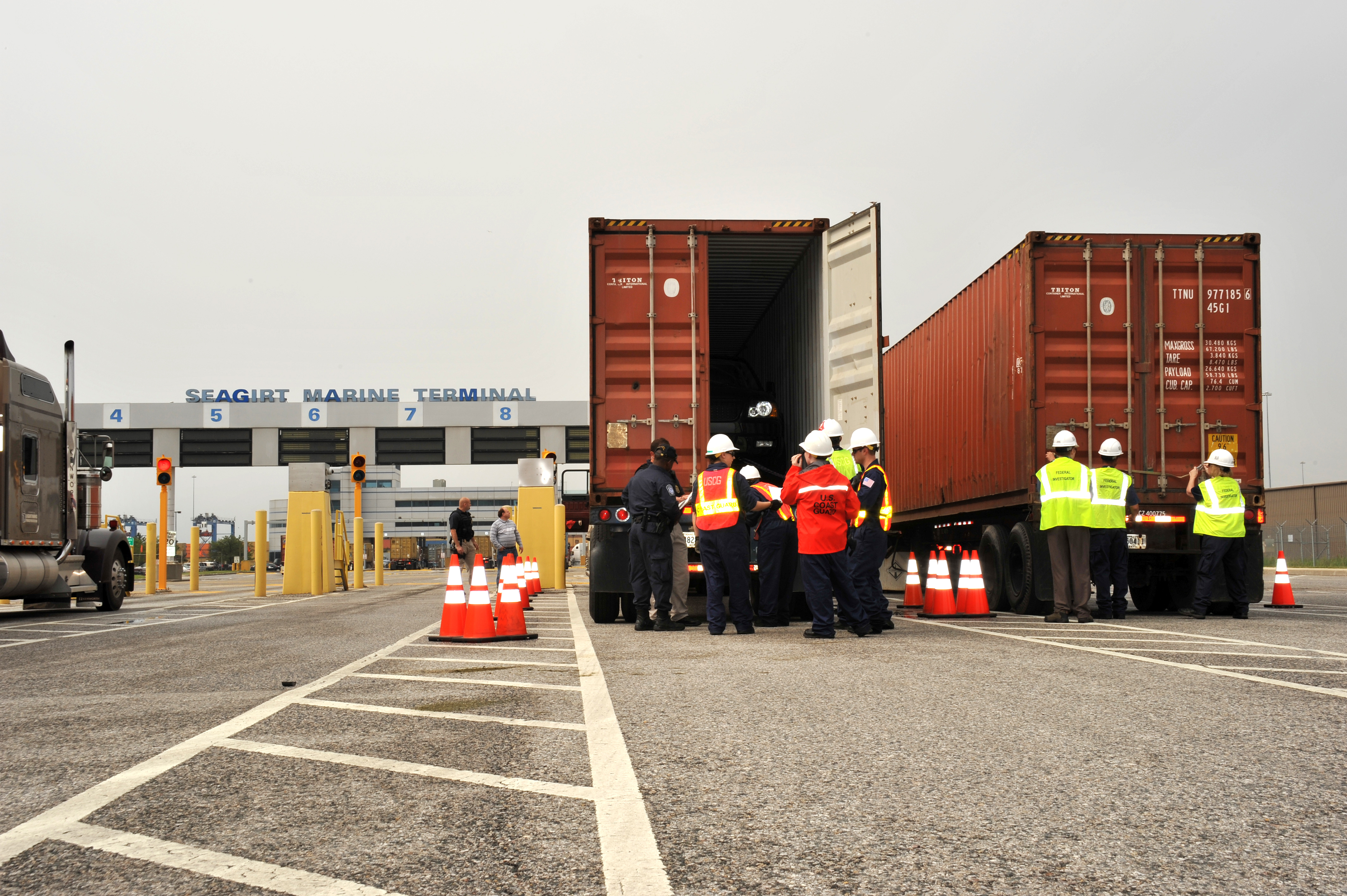

== History ==
Around 1962, Coast Guard enlisted members began being assigned to carry out routine oceanographic observations on ocean stations, ice breakers, and oceanographic ships. These billets were filled by Aerographers Mates (AG) and Sonarmen (SO) until in November 1968, when the decision was made to create a new rating. The new rating absorbed the AG rating and functions and SOs were given the option of converting. The rating supported the Coast Guard's Ocean Weather Station Programs, Aviation Support Programs, International Ice Patrol, and Polar Ice Operations Program, among others. The official name of Marine Science Technician was adopted in 1970.

== Training and qualification ==
The MST rate requires high ASVAB scores. Prospective MSTs must meet Armed Services Vocational Aptitude Battery (ASVAB) score requirements of 114 in Verbal Ability plus Arithmetic Reasoning (VE+AR), and a minimum Mathematics Knowledge (MK) score of 56. Training for the rating is accomplished through an 11-week course at USCG Training Center Yorktown, VA. Upon graduation, MSTs may go on to pursue qualifications such as Pollution Responder, Federal On-Scene Coordinator's Representative, Facility Inspector, Container Inspector, Port State Control Examiner, Port State Control Officer (with vessel type classification) and other specialized qualifications.

== See also ==
- Marine safety (USCG)
- Prevention Operations Ashore Insignia
- Response Operations Ashore Insignia
