= MSTS =

MSTS may refer to:

- Military Sea Transportation Service, the pre-1970 name for the Military Sealift Command of the U.S. Navy
- Microsoft Train Simulator, a 2001 train simulator developed for Microsoft Windows
- Montreuil-sur-Thérain station, a train station in Oise, France

== See also ==
- MST (disambiguation)
