= MST =

MST may refer to:

== Education ==
- Manchester School of Technology, in Manchester, New Hampshire, US
- Master of Studies, a postgraduate degree
- Master of Science in Teaching, a postgraduate degree
- Master of Theological Studies
- Melbourne School of Theology
- Missouri University of Science and Technology, in Rolla, Missouri, US
- SKH Bishop Mok Sau Tseng Secondary School, Hong Kong

== Military ==
- Marine Science Technician, US Coast Guard rating
- Military sexual trauma
- Mobile Ship Target, term used in US Navy

== Organisations ==
- Media Standards Trust, UK
- Missionary Society of Saint Thomas, the Apostle
- Monterey–Salinas Transit, the public transit system for Monterey County, California, United States

=== Politics ===
- Landless Workers' Movement, (Movimento dos Trabalhadores Rurais Sem Terra), Brazil
- Workers' Socialist Movement (Argentina) (Movimiento Socialista de Trabajadores)
- Workers' Socialist Movement (Puerto Rico) (Movimiento Socialista de Trabajadores)

== Science and technology ==
- Madison Symmetric Torus, a plasma experiment at the University of Wisconsin–Madison, US
- Magnetic secure transmission, whereby a smartphone mimics a payment card's magnetic stripe
- Magnetic seizure therapy, a form of electrotherapy and electrical brain stimulation
- Mean sidereal time
- Medial superior temporal area, of the primate brain
- Measurement Science and Technology, an academic journal
- Microscale thermophoresis, moving particles in a microthermal gradient
- Micro systems technology, of micromachines
- Mobile service tower, a movable tower to provide services for a rocket launch
- Multiple scattering theory

=== Computing ===
- Minimum spanning tree, in graph theory
- .mst, a file extension of Microsoft Windows Installer
- Multiple Spanning Tree Protocol, for computer networks
- Multi-Stream Transport, multiple displays on a single DisplayPort connector

== Time zones ==
- Malaysia Standard Time (UTC+08)
- Mean Standard Time
- Mountain Standard Time (UTC−07), in North America
- Myanmar Standard Time (more commonly MMT) (UTC+06:30)

== Other uses ==
- IATA code for Maastricht Aachen Airport, Netherlands
- Manila Standard Today, a broadsheet newspaper in the Philippines
- Postal code for Mosta, Malta
- Mountains-to-Sea Trail, a hiking trail across North Carolina, United States
- Multisystemic therapy, a treatment program for violent youth
- Murchison East railway station, Australia
- Mystery Science Theater 3000 (abbreviated as MST3K), an American television comedy series.

== See also ==
- Macrophage-stimulating 1 (MST1), gene encoding the macrophage-stimulating protein
