= Prevention Operations Ashore Insignia =

Badge of the United States Coast Guard

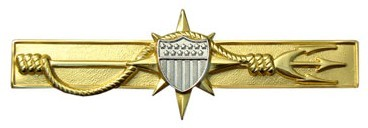
The Prevention Operations Ashore Insignia

The Prevention Operations Ashore Insignia is awarded to enlisted members (grade E-4 and above) and officers of the United States Coast Guard and United States Coast Guard Reserve, to Coast Guard civilians, and to members of the United States Coast Guard Auxiliary to recognize professional accomplishment in the Marine Safety program. In addition, the United States Coast Guard Auxiliary has a similar award called the Auxiliary Marine Safety (Trident) Device as part of the Auxiliary's Marine Safety Trident Program. On 19 April 2023, the name was changed from the Marine Safety Insignia to its current name.

== History ==
Admiral James Loy, as Commandant of the Coast Guard, approved the creation of the Marine Safety Insignia on 2 November 2000 to recognize the professional accomplishment of personnel in the Coast Guard's Marine Safety Program. The Commandant presented Rear Admiral Robert C. North, then-Assistant Commandant for Marine Safety and Environmental Protection, with the first Marine Safety Insignia on 10 April 2001, who accepted it "on behalf of all the marine safety professionals past, present, and future". Admiral North then presented the second Marine Safety Insignia to Master Chief Bell, the Marine Science Technician Rating Force Manager.

The Marine Safety Insignia was renamed as the Prevention Operations Ashore Insignia on 19 April 2023 in Commandant Instruction 1200.2A. The criteria for the insignia was changed to shift Response marine safety qualifications to the new Response Operations Ashore Insignia.

== Description ==
Originally, the description and symbolism of the Marine Safety Insignia was explained in Commandant Instruction M1200.1. When the award was changed to the Prevention Operations Ashore Insignia, the description remained the same but the symbolism was slightly changed:

The Prevention Operations Ashore Qualification Insignia is a gold rectangle with a trident extending within its length. A gold compass rose is centered above the trident with a silver shield covering the center of the compass rose. A braided rope runs the length of the trident and is intertwined with the compass rose.

- The trident represents the three areas within the Prevention community – Commercial Vessel and Facility Inspections, Marine Investigations, and Waterways Management – and is also the recognized symbol of the Marine Science Technician rating. (Previously, as the Marine Safety Insignia, the trident represented "the three pronged approach to our mission; prevention, preparedness, and response".)
- The compass rose is a recognized symbol of the world – acknowledging our worldwide reputation, influence, and duty stations.
- The shield represents the safety and protection of people, property, and the environment.
- The combination of silver and gold in the same insignia represents the Enlisted members (silver) and the Officer Corps (gold). Not having a separate color insignia for each symbolizes the similarity of qualifications required to fulfill the mission, regardless of rank/rate.
- The braided rope represents the Coast Guard Seal, our service, and its maritime heritage. The rope intertwined among the other symbols represents the coordination between all Prevention (previously marine safety) personnel and operations for the successful mission completion.

== Criteria ==
To receive the Prevention Operations Ashore Insignia the member must earn four Prevention competencies. To earn the permanent version of the insignia, the member must also serve a cumulative five years at certain unit types in a billet with direct and regular involvement in Prevention operations as determined by the commanding officer. If the member has not obtained the required five years, temporary entitlement may be awarded for the period that the member is permanently assigned to that unit. The list of eligible competencies and unit/billet types are found in Commandant Instruction 1200.2A.

== Insignia guidance and references ==
The first detailed information on the Marine Safety Insignia was announced in ALCOAST 183/01. More guidance was included in ALCOAST 295/01. Updated guidance was announced in ALCOAST 192/10, which changed the marine safety field unit service requirement for permanent award from four years to five, and updated the criteria to reflect modified qualification codes and the adoption of the Sector organizational structure. In December 2015, the insignia guidance was administratively updated with no change to the award criteria. The guidance was found in Chapter 8 of the Military Qualifications and Insignia Manual, COMDTINST M1200.1.

Current qualification policy is contained in Commandant Instruction 1200.2A as announced by ALCOAST 162/23.

The insignia must be worn in accordance with Chapter 4 paragraph 4.B.4 of the Uniform Regulations Manual.

== Auxiliary Marine Safety (Trident) Device ==
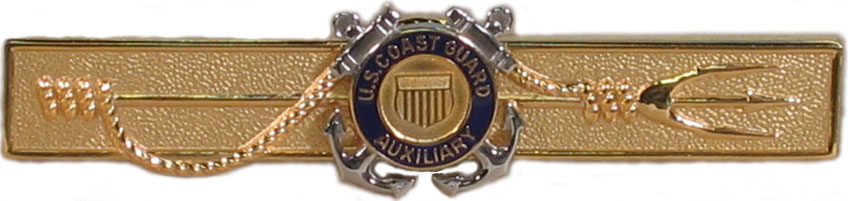
USCG Auxiliary Trident Device

The United States Coast Guard Auxiliary has a similar device called the Auxiliary Marine Safety (Trident) Device. This device is awarded after completion of:

1. The following marine safety courses: Introduction to Marine Safety and Environmental Protection; FEMA Emergency Management Institute Courses ICS 100, ICS 200, ICS 210 or ICS 300, IS 700 and IS 800; and the Ocean Conservancy Good Mate Course.
2. Four Performance Qualification Standards (PQS) as described in the USCG Auxiliary Marine Safety Performance Qualification Standards.
3. Five years of service in Marine Safety & Environmental Protection missions (consisting of at least 96 hours of service per calendar year); however, a conditional award of this device may be awarded based on a recommendation from the local USCG Captain of the Port if all aforementioned requirements are met other than the five years of service.

== See also ==
- Badges of the United States Coast Guard
- Marine safety (USCG)
