= Coxswain =

Person in charge of a boat, particularly its navigation and steering

The coxswain (/ˈkɒksən/ or /ˈkɒksweɪn/) is the person in charge of a boat, particularly its navigation and steering. The etymology of the word gives a literal meaning of "boat servant" since it comes from cock, referring to the cockboat, a type of ship's boat, and swain, an Old English term derived from the Old Norse sveinn meaning boy or servant. In 1724, a "cockswain" was defined as "An officer of a ship who takes care of the cockboat, barge or shallop, with all its furniture, and is in readiness with his crew to man the boat on all occasions." When the term "cockboat" became obsolete, the title of coxswain as the person in charge of a ship's boat remained.

In some modern navies and uniformed services, the role refers to a senior sailor with a broader responsibility for maintaining routine and discipline.

== Rowing ==
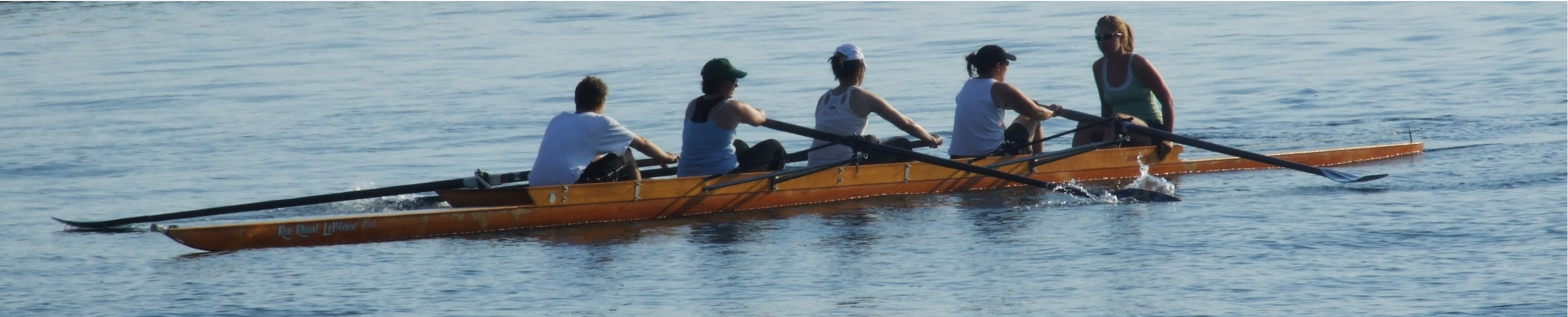
A women's 4+, a "Four" with coxswain in the stern

In rowing, the coxswain sits in either the bow or the stern of the boat (depending on the type of boat) while verbally and physically controlling the boat's steering, speed, timing and fluidity. The primary duty of a coxswain is to ensure the safety of those in the boat. In a race setting, the coxswain is tasked with motivating the crew as well as steering as straight a course as possible to minimize the distance to the finish line. Coxswains are also responsible for knowing proper rowing technique and running drills to improve technique.

A coxswain is the coach in the boat: in addition to following the orders of the team coach, the coxswain is connected to the way the boat feels, what's working, what needs to be changed, and how. A successful coxswain must keep track of the drill, time, pace, words of the coach, feel of the boat, direction of the boat, and safety. During a race, a coxswain is responsible for steering, calling the moves, and responding to the way the other boats are moving. Success depends on the physical and mental strength of the rowers, ability to respond to the environment, and the way in which the coxswain motivates the rowers, not only as individuals but as members of the crew.

== Royal Navy ==
Royal Navy Coxswain branch badge

In the Royal Navy in the days of sail, the coxswain was a petty officer or chief petty officer who commanded the barge of a captain or admiral. Later the coxswain was the senior deck petty officer or chief petty officer aboard a smaller vessel such as a corvette or submarine, who was responsible for the steering. On smaller vessels, the coxswain assumed the duties that would be performed by the chief boatswain's mate and master-at-arms aboard larger vessels.

In World War I, the term was also used to refer to a chief petty officer who was in charge of steering airships operated by the Royal Naval Air Service.

In World War II pilots of landing craft were referred to as coxswains.

In the Royal Canadian Navy, the appointment of coxswain (or capitaine d'armes in French) is given to the senior non-commissioned officer aboard a ship, the equivalent to a command master chief petty officer in the US Navy. For larger vessels such as a destroyer, frigate or the Harry DeWolf-class ships (AOPVs), a coxswain holds the rank of chief petty officer 1st class (CPO1). For submarines, a coxswain holds the rank of chief petty officer 2nd class (CPO2). For Kingston-class coastal defence vessel, a coxswain usually holds the rank of petty officer 1st class (PO1) or CPO2.

The term was also sometimes used aboard merchant ships for the senior petty officer in charge of the helm. The fictional Israel Hands, for example, was the coxswain of Hispaniola in Treasure Island.

== Naval cadets ==
In Royal Navy Sections of the Combined Cadet Force, the rank of Cadet Coxswain is the highest that a cadet can achieve, except in the rare occurrence that they are promoted to the rank of Cadet Under Officer. The rank of Coxswain equates to the rank of Cadet Warrant Officer in the Royal Air Force Sections, and the rank of Cadet Regimental Sergeant Major in the Army Sections.

In the Royal Canadian Sea Cadets, the position of Coxswain is often appointed to the cadet with the rank of Cadet Chief Petty Officer First Class (C/CPO1). This would be the equivalent of the position of Regimental Sergeant Major in the Royal Canadian Army Cadets held by a Cadet Chief Warrant Officer (C/CWO), or Squadron Warrant Officer in the Royal Canadian Air Cadets held by a Cadet Warrant Officer 1st Class (C/WO1).

== United States Coast Guard ==
In the United States Coast Guard and United States Coast Guard Auxiliary, the coxswain is the person in charge of a small boat. The coxswain has the authority to direct all boat and crew activities during the mission and modify planned missions to provide for the safety of the boat and the crew.

Before a person can be assigned to be a coxswain, they have to go through a qualification procedure, be certified and maintain the certification to be a coxswain. Upon certification, they are awarded the Coxswain Badge. This qualification procedure requires a significant amount of practice in boat handling as well as previous experience as a boat crew member.

The Coast Guard does not have a dedicated coxswain rating. Any Coast Guardsman, regardless of their rating or specialty, may be additionally designated as a coxswain upon proper qualification. An advancement to boatswain's mate second class requires that the individual qualify as and maintain certification as a coxswain. A commanding officer or officer in charge of a land based unit with boats has to be certified and stay certified as a coxswain on all boats in the unit or be relieved of command.

A coxswain is assigned to a boat by the command authority and can only be relieved by the commanding officer/officer in charge, executive officer/executive petty officer, or senior officer present. The coxswain's authority is independent of rank and/or seniority in relation to any other person on board the boat. Unlike the commanding officer of a cutter or ship, a coxswain does not automatically have command authority.

== See also ==
- Helmsman
- Navy boat crew
