= Intelligence Professional Insignia =

Qualification badge of the US Coast Guard

The US Coast Guard Intelligence Professional Insignia is awarded to enlisted members (grade E-4 and above) and officers of the US Coast Guard (USCG), US Coast Guard Reserve, and Coast Guard civilians who met the criteria since September 11, 2023 approved by Commandant Adm. Linda L. Fagan.

== Authorization ==
Members of the eligible categories may be entitled to temporary wear of the insignia by meeting the following conditions:

- Complete Intelligence Job Entry Level Training.
- Obtain the Intelligence Core (INTCORE) Competency at the Apprentice level.
- Possess a current Intelligence Fundamentals Professional Certification (IFPC), as defined by the Under Secretary of Defense for Intelligence and Security.
- Certified by an issuing authority.
- The temporary insignia may only be worn while actively serving in an qualifying Intelligence billet. Members of the eligible categories may be entitled to permanent wear of the insignia by meeting the following conditions:
- Eligible to wear the Intelligence Professional Insignia under temporary conditions.
- Obtain the INTCORE Competency at the Master level.
- Possess a current IFPC.
- Certified by an issuing authority.

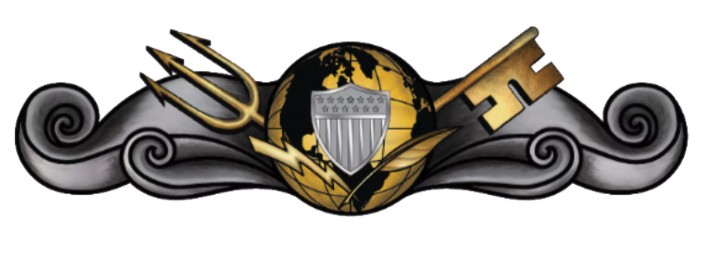
US Coast Guard and Reserve Intelligence Professional Insignia

== Insignia ==
The insignia is a pewter grey badge with horizontal waves representing the USCG heritage. In the center is a black and gold globe that shows its global mission. There are also a large crossed trident and key - representing the core values of the USCG and knowledge. The USCG shield in silver is on the globe and below it are a lightning bolt and a quill representing speed and information.
