= Coxswain Insignia =

Qualification device of the US Coast Guard

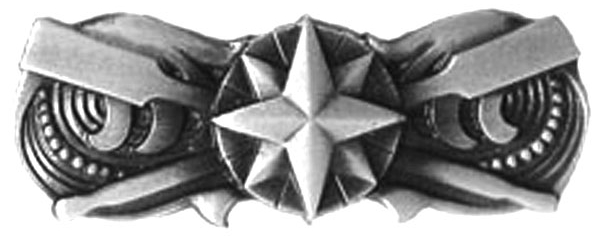
Coxswain Insignia

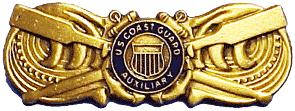
Auxiliary Coxswain Insignia worn by USCG Auxiliary Coxswains

The Coxswain Insignia (/ˈkɒksən/ KOK-sən) is a qualification device of the United States Coast Guard which is issued to all personnel who qualify as a coxswain. The Coxswain on a Coast Guard Small Boat is in charge of the vessel and all personnel on board. Coxswains, while underway, operate without regard to rank or seniority. A Coxswain in the Coast Guard has a responsibility that is normally only undertaken by officers in other branches of the military.

The Coxswain Insignia and the Surfman Badge may not be worn simultaneously. The United States Navy equivalent of the Coxswain badge is the Small Craft Enlisted Pin.

The Coxswain Pin can be awarded Temporarily or Permanently. To be awarded the Coxswain Insignia permanently a member has to have 5 years of certification with at least 2 years on a Standard Boat and retain certification by retaking and passing the appropriate tests.

The United States Coast Guard Auxiliary also issues its own version of the insignia. The insignia is similar to the Coast Guard version but is bronze instead of pewter, and has the Auxiliary insignia located in the center of the device in place of the compass rose.

== See also ==
- Military badges of the United States
