= Special Agent Insignia =

Qualification badge of the US Coast Guard

The US Coast Guard Special Agent Insignia is awarded to enlisted member (grade E-4 and above) and officers of the US Coast Guard, US Coast Guard Reserve, Coast Guard civilians and former special agents who met the criteria since August 2024.

== Authorization ==
Members of the eligible categories may be entitled to permanent wear of the insignia by meeting the following conditions:

- Active Duty Agents or Civilian Special Agents are graduates of the Criminal Investigator Training Program or equivalent and graduate from Special Agent Basic Training or equivalent.
- Reserve Special Agents must graduate from an accredited federal, state, or local law enforcement academy and attend the Coast Guard Investigative Service (CGIS) Reserve Indoctrination Training Program or equivalent.
- Complete five years of service as a Coast Guard Special Agent.
- Certified by an issuing authorityMembers of the eligible categories may be entitled to temporary wear of the insignia by meeting the following conditions:
- Special Agents who have met all the permanent wear requirements, but have not yet completed five consecutive years are eligible to wear the insignia after completing one year of service as a Coast Guard Special Agent while currently serving in a CGIS billet.

Personnel who previously served in the CGIS and meet the permanent wear requirements or those who were injured or medically separated while in the line of duty are eligible to Retroactive Award of the insignia.

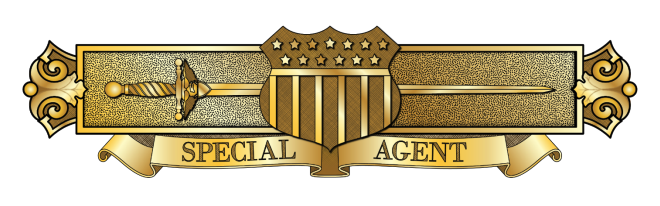
US Coast Guard and Reserve Special Agent Insignia

== Insignia ==
The Special Agent Insignia is a gold rectangle device with a decorative frame. Centered in the frame is a national shield containing thirteen stars and stripes, symbolizing protection. The U.S. Revenue Cutter Service sword is displayed horizontally, behind the shield. It symbolizes Lady Justice’s double-edged sword. Below the horizontal frame is a scroll reading Special Agent.
