= Response Operations Ashore Insignia =

Badge of the United States Coast Guard

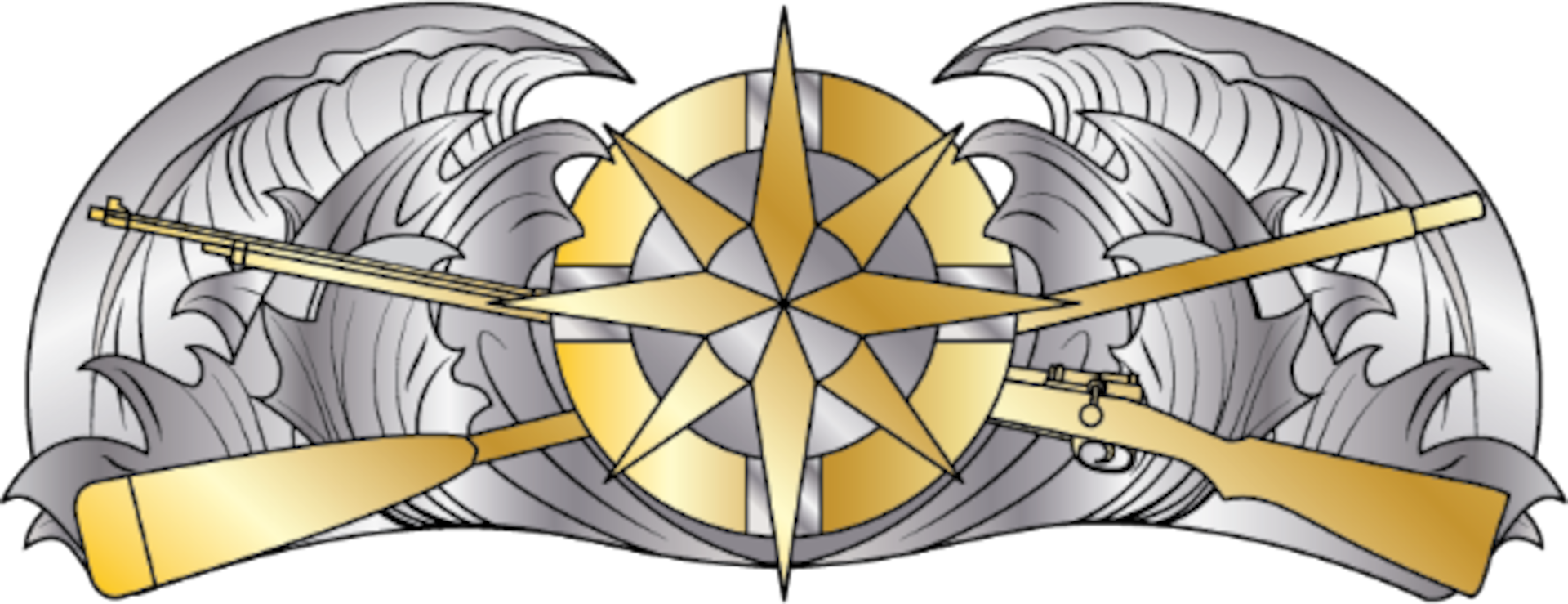
The Response Operations Ashore Insignia

The Response Operations Ashore Insignia is awarded to enlisted members (grade E-4 and above) and officers of the United States Coast Guard and United States Coast Guard Reserve and Coast Guard civilian employees to recognize professional accomplishment in the Response Operations Ashore community. COMDTINST 1200.4 contains the requirements for earning the Response Operations Ashore Insignia and process for requesting award of the Insignia. The Response Operations Ashore Insignia will be retroactively awarded to any member who served in the Response Operations Ashore community and meets the requirements outlined in COMDTINST 1200.4.

== History ==
Admiral Linda L. Fagan, as Commandant of the Coast Guard, approved the creation of the Response Operations Ashore Insignia on April 11, 2023 to recognize the professional accomplishment of personnel in the Coast Guard's Response Operations Ashore Community.

== Description ==
The description and symbolism of the Response Operations Ashore Insignia is explained:

The Operations Ashore Response Insignia represents the complementary nature of the various elements of the Response community to protect the country's maritime safety and security. The insignia shows a compass rose, framed by a life ring, overlapping a crossed oar and rifle surrounded by breaking wave crests. The Insignia has gold accents on the compass rose, life ring, oar, and rifle. The combination of pewter and gold in the Insignia represents the shared mission of both officers and enlisted team members in fulfilling the various Response missions regardless of rank/rate.

== See also ==
- Badges of the United States Coast Guard
