= Missions of the United States Coast Guard =

The United States Coast Guard is the coastal defense, search and rescue, and maritime law enforcement branch of the United States Armed Forces and is one of the country's eight uniformed services. It carries out three basic roles, which are further subdivided into eleven statutory missions. The three roles are:

- Maritime safety
- Maritime security
- Maritime stewardship

The eleven statutory missions as defined by law are divided into homeland security missions and non-homeland security missions. Non-homeland security missions include: Marine safety, search and rescue, aids to navigation, living marine resources (fisheries law enforcement), marine environmental protection, and ice operations Homeland security missions include: Ports, waterways, and coastal security (PWCS); drug interdiction; migrant interdiction; defense readiness; and other law enforcement.

A given unit within the Coast Guard may be carrying out several missions at once. For example, a 25-foot (7.6 m) RHIB assigned to maritime security may also watch for out-of-place or missing aids to navigation, pollution, and unsafe boating practices.

== Maritime safety ==
=== Search and rescue ===
See National Search and Rescue Committee

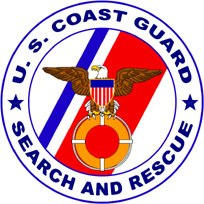
Search and Rescue emblem of U.S. Coast Guard

Search and Rescue (SAR) is one of the Coast Guard's oldest missions. The National Search and Rescue Plan designates the United States Coast Guard as the federal agency responsible for maritime SAR operations in U.S. and international waters, and the United States Air Force as the federal agency responsible for inland SAR. Both agencies maintain Rescue Coordination Centers to coordinate this effort.

Inshore rescues are usually performed by 25-foot, 29-foot, 45-foot, and 47-foot boats. HH-60 and HH-65 helicopters serve on both the high seas and inshore. Any Coast Guard asset in the vicinity of a case may respond.

Search and rescue operations are numerous and varied. A sample of operations in February 2005 included:

- Coast Guard Station Chetco River, Oregon, dispatched its rigid-hull inflatable boat with a crew and an emergency medical technician on board to evacuate a fisherman whose hand was nearly amputated in an accident. The fisherman's hand was reattached.
- A helicopter rescued two recreational snowmobilers in Anchor Bay, Michigan, whose vehicle crashed through the ice.
- Boats from Coast Guard Station Point Allerton in Hull came to the assistance of the fishing vessel Lady Lorraine, which was on fire off Scituate, Massachusetts.
- Aircraft from Coast Guard Air Station Humboldt Bay, California, searched waters off Oregon for a missing light aircraft.

Large-scale search and rescue operations occur less frequently, but often involve many Coast Guard vessels and aircraft from a large area. Helicopters and rescue swimmers participated in the 36-hour rescue of six crew members from the 570-foot (170 m) tanker Bow Mariner, which exploded and sank off of Chincoteague, Virginia, on February 28, 2004. Two rescue swimmers were awarded the Coast Guard Medal for their efforts to keep the rescued mariners alive.

Another large-scale operation took place in December 2004 in the Aleutian Islands, when the cargo ship Selendang Ayu, of Malaysian registry, broke in two in heavy seas. The Selendang Ayu carried soybeans, 424,000 gallons (1,600 m³) of fuel oil, and 18,000 gallons (68 m³) of diesel. The operation saved 12 of the ship's 18 crew members and prevented harm to nearby wildlife. Six of the ship's crew members died when a Coast Guard HH-60 Jayhawk helicopter crashed during the rescue.

Occasionally, Coast Guard rescuers are used in non-maritime situations. On January 11, 2007, the Toledo Blade reported that a worker who was dangling from a 110-foot (33 m) grain elevator in Ottawa Lake, Michigan, was rescued by a Coast Guard helicopter.

=== Marine safety ===
Coast Guard personnel inspect commercial vessels, respond to pollution, investigate marine casualties and merchant mariners, manage waterways, and license merchant mariners. Coast Guard officials also draft recommendations for the transit of hazardous cargo by ship, such as liquid natural gas. The Coast Guard carries out investigations to determine the cause of accidents on American-flagged (Flag State) ships or foreign ships in American waters (Port State).

Among the activities of the Coast Guard is inspection of commercial boats carrying passengers for hire. Vessels carrying more than six passengers must show a Certificate of Inspection; this indicates the crews of such vessels have undergone drug testing, that the vessel's firefighting and lifesaving equipment is adequate and in good condition, and machinery, hull construction, wiring, stability, safety railings, and navigation equipment meet Federal standards.

The Coast Guard performs its marine safety mission by conducting the following activities:

- Marine inspection: The Officer in Charge, Marine Inspection has field level responsibilities of the marine inspection mission. The two main components are Flag State responsibility and Port State responsibility. The four basic categories of vessels subject to inspection are Passenger, Tanker, Cargo and Special use vessels. There are two kinds of inspections: Safety and Security.
- Marine investigation: Marine casualty investigation and personnel actions.
- Waterways Management: Provides marine safety information to the public, and conducts marine event permitting, bridge administration and marine transportation system services.
- Port safety: Prevent accidental damage to ports.
- Merchant mariner credentialing: The Coast Guard is responsible for evaluating, certifying, and credentialing mariners that work on U.S. merchant ships.

=== Recreational boating safety ===
The Coast Guard, through the United States Coast Guard Auxiliary, along with the United States Power Squadrons, perform Vessel Safety Checks (VSC) on recreational boaters throughout the country. Qualified Vessel Safety Check inspectors check for proper registration, an adequate number and type of personal flotation devices (PFDs), loaded fire extinguishers, and the ability to send a distress signal, either visibly by flare or flag, or by radio. Although Auxiliarist and United States Power Squadron VSC inspectors do not have law enforcement authority, Coast Guardsmen can issue citations to vessels without adequate equipment, and in extraordinary cases terminate a voyage and order a recreational boat to return to port. Auxiliarists also visit marine dealers and retailers to ensure that an updated schedule of all public education courses and VSC stations with contact phone numbers is displayed at the marine dealer, as well as other Coast Guard publications on recreational boating safety and federal boating laws.

=== Ice operations ===
==== United States ====
See National Ice Center

==== International ====
See International Ice Patrol

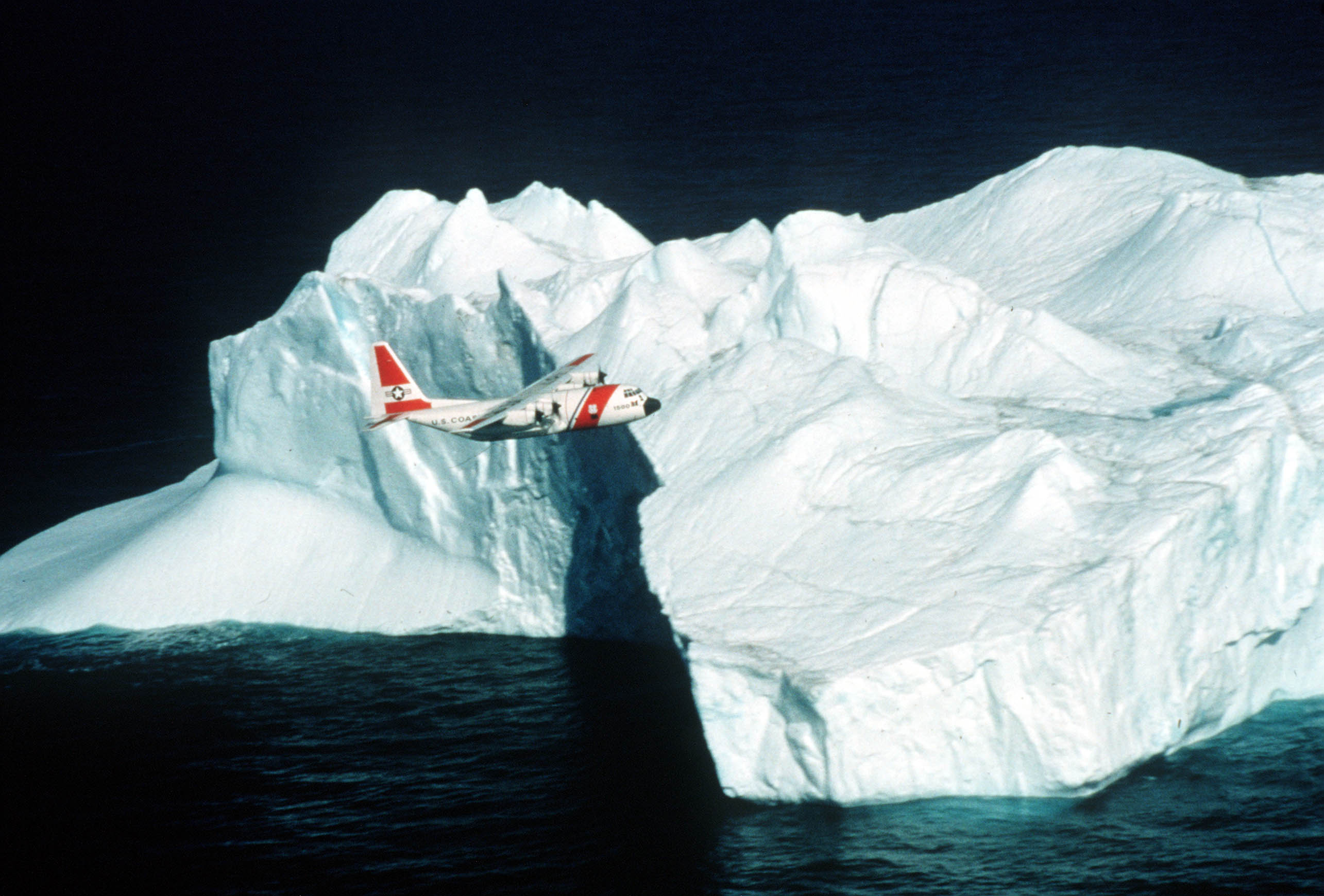
A Coast Guard C-130 on International Ice Patrol in the Arctic Ocean

Icebergs off the Grand Banks have always posed a problem for shipping. In 1833, the Lady of the Lake struck an iceberg and sank with the loss of 70 lives. Between 1882 and 1890, four more cargo vessels were sunk and 40 more damaged.

Following the sinking of the RMS Titanic in April 1912, an international conference of major Atlantic maritime powers agreed to fund USCG patrols to locate and report icebergs in the North Atlantic, in particular off the Grand Banks. The International Ice Patrol was founded as a result of this conference.

The first ships for the International Ice Patrol were the U.S. Navy cruisers USS Chester and USS Birmingham, which were dispatched for the remainder of the 1912 season. The Navy could not spare ships for these patrols in 1913, and the Revenue Cutter Service assigned USRC Seneca and USRC Miami to patrol. The Revenue Cutter Service was tasked with maintaining the IIP on February 7, 1914.

The IIP was continued into 1941, during the World War II, to allow the United States a legal pretext to sail to Greenland. In 1946, the IIP resumed operations flying three modified B-17 bombers and using cutters such as the USCGC Tampa. Today, this mission is carried out by Coast Guard HC-130 aircraft from CGAS Elizabeth City, North Carolina, forward-deployed to Gander, Newfoundland. These aircraft report sightings to the International Ice Patrol headquarters in Groton, Connecticut. Officers assigned to the IIP are required to hold not only a security clearance, but possess at least a master's degree in Marine science.

== Maritime mobility ==
The Coast Guard maintains the DGPS radio navigation system, as well as buoys, daymarks, and other visual aids to navigation [ATONs] in U.S. waters and in selected foreign waters—a major activity of Coast Guard buoy tenders, and of special Auxiliary patrols. The Coast Guard has three large icebreakers, and many cutters can clear ice-clogged waterways for essential seagoing traffic.

== Homeland and maritime security ==
Maritime security missions are coordinated through the Coast Guard Office of Law Enforcement, which is part of the Operations Directorate headquartered in Washington, D.C.

Immediately after the September 11, 2001 attacks, the Coast Guard imposed restrictions on traffic in American waters. Vessels over 300 tons displacement must file notice within 96 hours of estimated time of arrival in American waters, or 24 hours for short voyages. Liquefied natural gas carriers are forbidden to enter American waters without escort and to anchor near major cities. Coast Guard and Auxiliary units patrol key harbors and waterfronts and intercept foreign merchant vessels for identification and crew checks. The Coast Guard stepped up patrols in waters near New York City and Washington in 2004 after receiving reports of increased threats.

Maritime security patrols increase in number and intensity around special events, such as the Super Bowl, national political conventions, and Independence Day celebrations. Such patrols were provided during the 2004 Republican Party national convention in New York City; the June 2004 G8 Summit at Sea Island, Georgia near Savannah, Ga.; and the January 20, 2005, presidential inauguration in the Potomac and Anacostia rivers of Washington, D.C.; and the funeral of former President Gerald R. Ford in January, 2007. In addition, following the July 7, 2005 London bombings, Coast Guard units were placed on a higher level of alert.

Coast Guard helicopters enforce temporary flight restriction zones in rotary wing air intercept missions with the North American Air Defense Command, the Federal Aviation Administration (FAA), and the United States Secret Service.

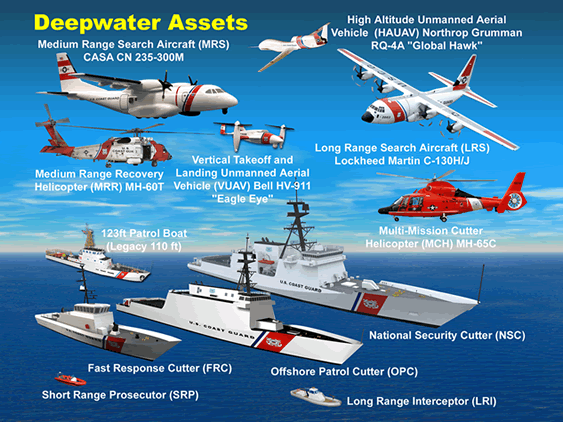
Proposed assets

As part of the Coast Guard's Deepwater program, cutters will carry 70 unarmed surveillance unmanned aerial vehicles.

=== Port and waterways security ===
The Coast Guard is responsible for the security of 361 U.S. ports and 95,000 statute miles (150,000 km) of waterways.

The local Coast Guard commander has legal authority over shipping in American waters as Captain of the Port. This role has increased in importance since the Sept. 11 attacks. The Captain of the Port can declare inland waters in his jurisdiction to be "special security zones", wherein commercial vessels must report their movements to the nearest Coast Guard station.

The Coast Guard has dedicated Port Security Units (PSUs) that can be deployed around the U.S. or overseas, as in the Persian Gulf War. Coast Guard PSUs from Seattle, Washington; San Pedro, California; Port Clinton, Ohio; Gulfport, Mississippi and St. Petersburg, Florida were called up for active duty in the Persian Gulf between December 2002 and December 2004. Coast Guard members also jointly staff the U.S. Navy's Naval Coastal Warfare Squadrons (NCWRONs), part of the Naval Coastal Warfare command structure. Coast Guard members assigned to NCWRONs have served in the Persian Gulf, the Balkans, Korea and elsewhere around the world. Both PSUs and NCWRONs are primarily staffed by Reserve personnel.

Another element in security are Maritime Safety and Security Teams.

In 2006, the U.S. Coast Guard's Ninth District and the Royal Canadian Mounted Police began a program called "Shiprider", in which a 12 Mounties from the RCMP detachment at Windsor and 16 Coast Guard boarding officers from stations in Michigan ride in each other's vessels. The intent is to allow for seamless enforcement of the international border.

=== Drug interdiction ===
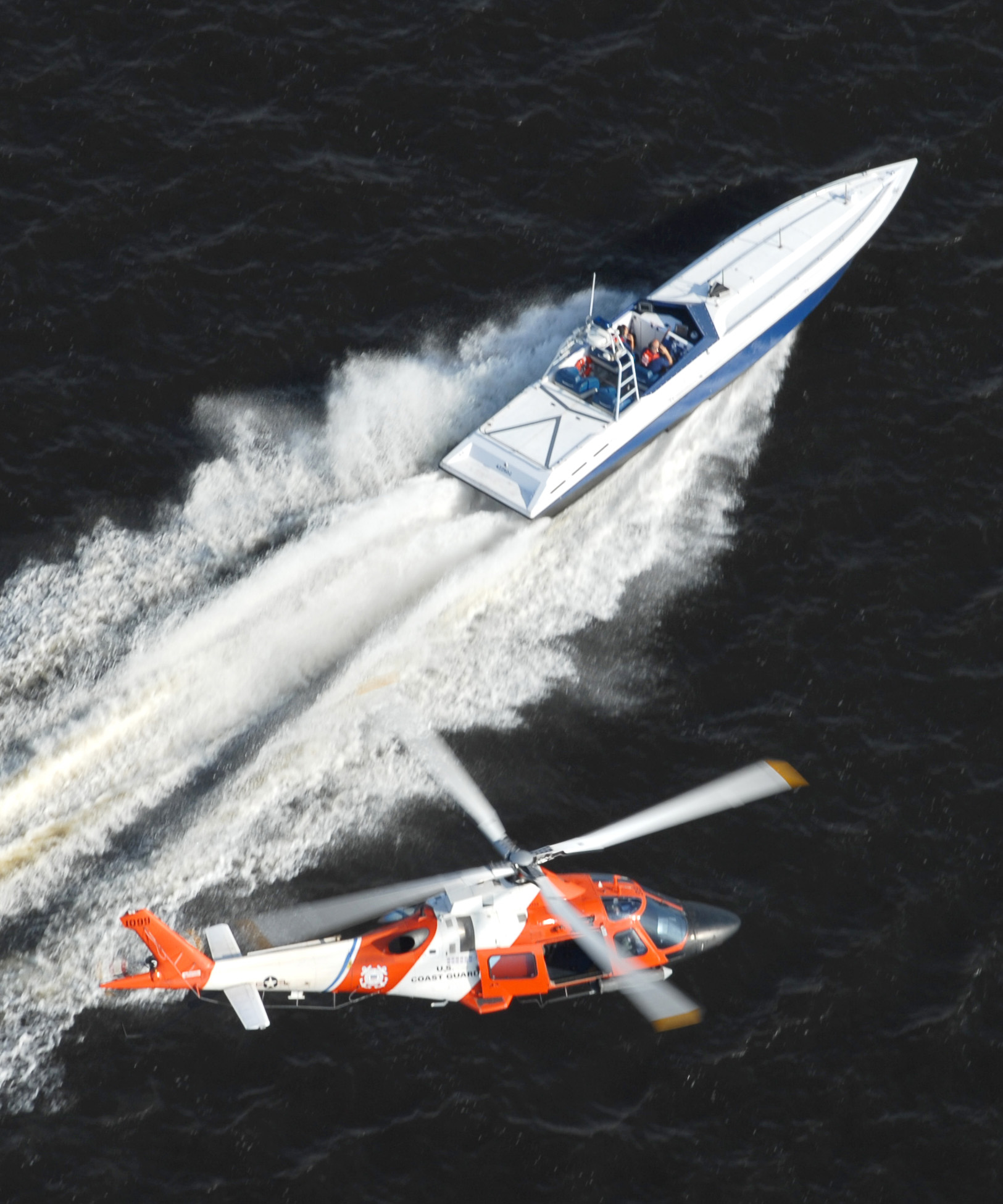
A helicopter from HITRON pursues a go-fast boat during drug interdiction training.

The Coast Guard is the lead agency in maritime drug interdiction. It shares legal responsibility with U.S. Customs and Border Protection. Coast Guard units coordinate their Caribbean Sea activities with the U.S. Navy, the Royal Navy, and the Royal Netherlands Navy.

Coast Guard missions were responsible for about 52% of the cocaine seized by the U.S. government in 2002. For example, in February 2004, the USCGC Hamilton (WHEC-715), based in San Diego, California, operating north of the Galapagos Islands, seized 6,000 pounds (2,700 kg) of cocaine from a vessel. The Hamilton launched a helicopter that fired at and disabled the vessel's engine. Another vessel with 2,600 pounds (1,200 kg) of cocaine was also seized.

The Helicopter Interdiction Tactical Squadron (HITRON) is based in Jacksonville, Florida. HITRON flew armed Agusta MH-68A Stingray helicopters from December 2000 until February 2008. At that time, HITRON took on the mantle of the Atlantic Area Deployment Center, and began flying MH-65C Multi-mission Cutter Helicopters (MCH). Since its foundation in 1998 and formal commissioning, it has participated in 157 separate go-fast boat interdictions.

==== Posse Comitatus ====
The Posse Comitatus Act and related policies generally prohibit the Department of Defense branches of the United States armed forces from enforcing U.S. laws, but these restrictions do not apply to the U.S. Coast Guard. The Coast Guard provides Law Enforcement Detachments (LEDETs) to U.S. Navy ships and the LEDETs do the actual boarding, interdiction and arrests with the assistance of the Navy.

=== Alien migrant interdiction ===
The Coast Guard, especially its Florida-based Seventh District, enforces U.S. immigration law at sea. Major areas of operations are off the Florida coast, the Mona Passage between the Dominican Republic and Puerto Rico, and Guam. Many of these missions are also search-and-rescue missions, since many migrants take to sea in unseaworthy vessels.

However, interdiction does not always succeed. In October 2002, for example, a 50-foot (15 m) wooden freighter carrying 220 undocumented Haitians ran aground near Miami.

=== U.S. Exclusive Economic Zone and Living Marine Resource ===
The Coast Guard is the lead federal agency for at-sea enforcement of U.S. fisheries laws. The Coast Guard's legal authority to enforce fisheries laws flows from the Magnuson-Stevens Fisheries Conservation and Management Act of 1976, which extended U.S. authority over fisheries to the 200 miles (370.4 kilometers) authorized by international law. Their missions include:

1. Protecting the U.S. Exclusive Economic Zone from foreign encroachment
2. Enforcing domestic fisheries law
3. Maintaining international fisheries agreements

=== Law and treaty enforcement ===
Law and treaty enforcement account for about 1/3 of the Coast Guard's budget. Title 14, U.S. Code, Section 2 states: "The Coast Guard shall enforce or assist in the enforcement of all applicable laws on, under and over the high seas and waters subject to the jurisdiction of the United States."

== National defense ==
During wartime, by order of the President, the Coast Guard can fall under the operational orders of the Department of the Navy. In other times, Coast Guard Port Security Units are often sent overseas to guard the security of ports and other assets. The Coast Guard also jointly staffs the U.S. Navy's Naval Coastal Warfare Groups and Squadrons (the latter of which were known as Harbor Defense Commands until late-2004) which oversee defense efforts in foreign littoral combat and inshore areas.

In 2002, the Coast Guard provided several 110-foot (34 m) Patrol boats that were shipped to the Persian Gulf to conduct maritime interception operations in support of Operation Iraqi Freedom. These ships became the core of a new unit, home ported in Bahrain, known as Patrol Forces Southwest Asia (PATFORSWA). In addition to the patrol boats, PATFORSWA serves as the supporting unit for other Coast Guard units deployed in the Global War on Terrorism. Numerous Port Security Units, Harbor Defense Commands/NCW Squadrons and Law Enforcement Detachments (LEDETs) from the elite Tactical Law Enforcement Teams (TACLETs) have also been deployed in support of Operation Iraqi Freedom.

In 2006, the USCGC Midgett (WHEC 726) deployed to the Pacific and Indian Ocean as part of the USS Boxer (LHD 4) Expeditionary Strike Group, where it cross-trained with the Indian Coast Guard cutter Samar.

In July 2007, Coast Guardsmen, attached to the Maritime Safety and Security Team (MSST) out of Honolulu, Hawaii, and U.S. Navy Sailors, embarked aboard the dock-landing ship USS Harpers Ferry (LSD 49), took part of the Cooperation Afloat Readiness and Training (CARAT) 2007 task group to conduct visit, board, search and seizure (VBSS) training with the Republic of Singapore Navy (RSN) and the Singapore Police Coast Guard (PCG) July 20 at PCG headquarters on the former Brani Naval Base.

=== Special forces ===
- The Coast Guard is not a regular part of the United States Special Operations Command (USSOCOM or USSOC). However, the Coast Guard does have a number of deployable specialized forces within the Deployable Operations Group (DOG). Additionally, in 2008 the Coast Guard announced a memorandum of understanding with the Navy and U.S. Special Operations Command which allows a limited number of Coast Guard personnel to train and serve as Navy SEALs.
- The Coast Guard sometimes engages in the training of indigenous forces and joint operations, activities that overlap with the special forces.

== Expanded Arctic operations ==
On October 25, 2007, a Coast Guard HC-130 from Coast Guard Air Station Kodiak, Alaska, flew a 2300-mile (3700 km) mission over the North Pole. This was the beginning of an expanded mission for the Coast Guard in the Arctic based on recently observed climate changes. Rear Admiral Arthur Brooks, commander of the 17th District in Juneau, stated "The primary change in the Arctic is that for 150 years we have done exploration and research. The change that we now must prepare to do all Coast Guard missions in the Arctic, including maritime surveillance."

== Protection of natural resources ==
=== Marine pollution education, prevention, response and enforcement ===
Marine pollution occurs not only through carelessness, but through accident. In the event of large vessels sinking, after the rescue of any crew, the Coast Guard's next goal is to prevent oil and other hazardous materials from coming ashore. This is performed as part of the Coast Guard's marine environmental protection mission.

For example, on November 26, 2004, the Athos I, a 750-foot (230 m) cargo vessel of Cypriot registry, lost 30,000 gallons (114 m³) of heavy crude oil near Philadelphia as it was en route to the Citgo oil facility in Paulsboro, New Jersey. This incident triggered a response from the Coast Guard's Philadelphia Marine Safety Office, the United States Environmental Protection Agency, the New Jersey State Police, and from Citgo. The Coast Guard's role was firstly, to minimize the damage from the spill, by setting up protective booms around the spill, and secondly, to work with the New Jersey State Police in air and boat patrols to assess the damage.

==== National Response Center ====
Operated by the U.S. Coast Guard, the National Response Center (NRC) is the sole U.S. Government point of contact for reporting environmental spills, contamination, and pollution

The primary function of the National Response Center (NRC) is to serve as the sole national point of contact for reporting all oil, chemical, radiological, biological, and etiological discharges into the environment anywhere in the United States and its territories. In addition to gathering and distributing spill data for Federal On Scene Coordinators and serving as the communications and operations center for the National Response Team, the NRC maintains agreements with a variety of federal entities to make additional notifications regarding incidents meeting established trigger criteria. The NRC also takes Terrorist/Suspicious Activity Reports and Maritime Security Breach Reports. Details on the NRC organization and specific responsibilities can be found in the National Oil and Hazardous Substances Pollution Contingency Plan.

- U.S. National Response Team
- Federal On Scene Coordinator
- National Response Framework

=== Foreign vessel examinations ===
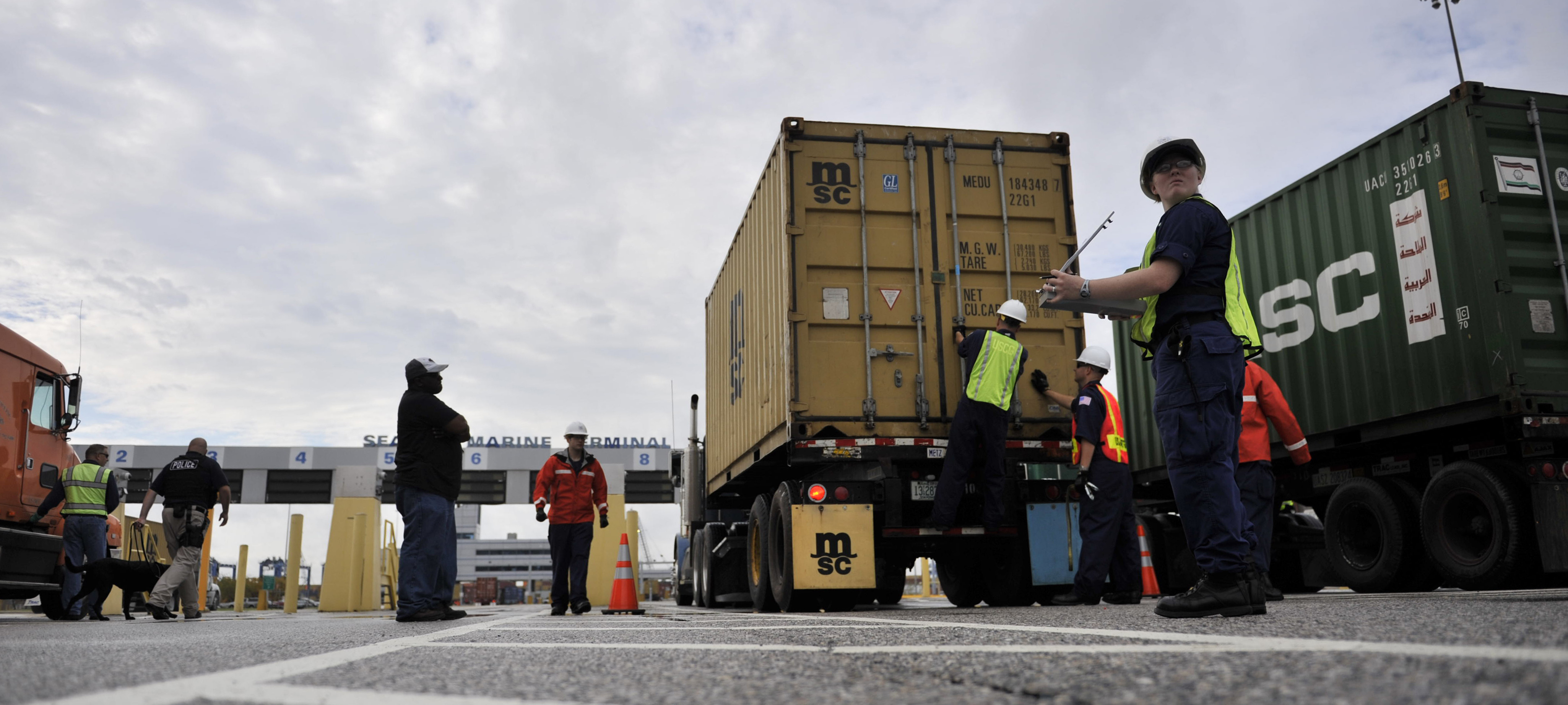
Coast Guard leads multi-agency port inspections

According to Title 33 of the Code of Federal Regulations, vessels entering American waters must provide in advance to the Coast Guard data about the ship's cargo, the names and passport numbers of each crew member, details about the ship's ownership and agents, and a list of recent port calls in a "Notice of Arrival" form. This information is collated in the National Vessel Movement Center in Martinsburg, West Virginia, and shared with U.S. Naval Intelligence in Suitland, Maryland as well as with the Port State Control (PSC) offices in major ports throughout the United States. From there, the Captain of the Port or his representatives in the PSC determines if the vessel involved needs a security exam, a safety exam, or both. Vessels must be examined every 6 months.

In September 2002, Coast Guard Port State Control Examiners searched a container ship in New Jersey based on intelligence information and because the inspectors detected radiation in the vessel. The cargo turned out to be ceramic tiles.

See also: Port State Control

=== Living marine resources protection ===
See above under U.S. Exclusive Economic Zone and Living Marine Resource

=== Marine and environmental science ===
The Coast Guard is the only one of the armed services that has an enlisted rate for environmental technician.

== Notes ==
Footnotes

Citations
