= Steamboat Inspection Service =

Defunct United States agency

- Steamboat Inspection Service (1871–1932); Bureau of Navigation and Steamboat Inspection (1932–1936); Bureau of Marine Inspection and Navigation (1936–1946)
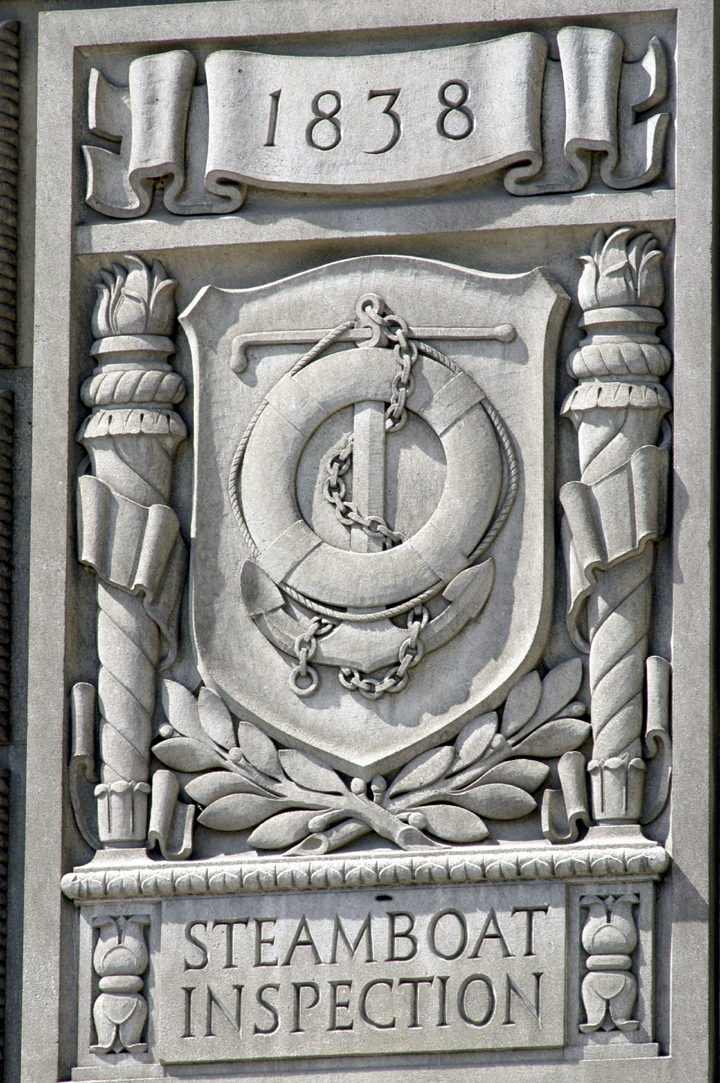
- Sculptured relief on the facade of the United States Department of Commerce Building in Washington, D.C.

Agency overview
- Formed: February 28, 1871; 155 years ago
- Dissolved: July 16, 1946; 80 years ago
- Superseding agency: United States Coast Guard
- Jurisdiction: Federal government of the United States
- Headquarters: Washington, D.C.
- Parent agency: United States Department of the Treasury (1871-1903); United States Department of Commerce and Labor (1903-1913); United States Department of Commerce (1913-1946)

Footnotes
- Functions temporarily transferred to United States Coast Guard 1942–1946.

The Steamboat Inspection Service was a United States agency created in 1871 to safeguard lives and property at sea. It merged with the Bureau of Navigation in 1932 to form the Bureau of Navigation and Steamboat Inspection, which in 1936 was reorganized into the Bureau of Marine Inspection and Navigation. The Bureau of Marine Inspection and Navigation's responsibilities were transferred temporarily to the United States Coast Guard in 1942. The Bureau was abolished in 1946, when its functions were transferred permanently to the Coast Guard.

== Act of 1838 ==
The safety inspection of merchant vessels documented under the flag of the United States has been authorized in varying degrees by Congress and required by law since 1838. In the early days, the United States Congress hesitated to pass adequate safety laws for fear of interfering with the growing and economically important steamboat industry.

The beginning and development of a federal maritime safety program arose from disasters that caused much death, injury and property loss; experience showed the greatest casualties were caused by boiler explosions and by fire aboard ship. As the steamboat industry grew, so did the general public's awareness of the need for marine safety laws. The public's growing concern over these maritime accidents prompted Congress to begin to act to protect the public, beginning with passing a law on July 7, 1838, to "provide better security of the lives of passengers on board of vessels propelled in whole or in part by steam" (5 Stat. L., 304). The law required owners or masters of vessels propelled in whole or in part by steam to obtain two certificates from appointed inspectors and provide one certificate to a customs official (surveyor or collector) to obtain a license and to be registered. The inspectors were to be chosen and sworn to their duty by the district court judge. Inspections were required to be repeated every 12 or 6 months as outlined in the law.

Steamboat accidents 1830 to 1840

Captain Edward Tripp, who had introduced steamboating to Baltimore, Maryland, in 1813 with the building of the steamboat Chesapeake, was the first Baltimore hull inspector and was appointed by a federal district judge to perform the safety inspection on the few vessels in Baltimore. Captain Tripp performed these duties between 1838 and 1852. At that time, the law provided a US$5.00 fee for each inspection to be paid by the vessel's owner.

== Steamboat Act of August 30, 1852 ==
The 1838 law proved inadequate as steamboat disasters increased in volume and severity. The period from 1847 to 1852 was marked by an unusual series of disasters primarily caused by boiler explosions; however, many were also caused by fires and collisions. These disasters resulted in the passage of the Steamboat Act of August 30, 1852 (10 Stat. L., 1852) in which enforcement powers were placed under the United States Department of the Treasury, rather than in the hands of private litigants as with the Act of 1838. The important features of the Steamboat Act were the requirement for hydrostatic testing of boilers and the requirement for a boiler steam safety valve. The act further required that both pilots and engineers be licensed by the local inspectors.

Under the Steamboat Act, the organization and form of a federal maritime inspection service began to emerge. Nine supervisory inspectors, each responsible for a specific geographic region, were appointed. There were also provisions for the appointment of local inspectors by a commission consisting of the local district collector of customs, the supervisory inspector, and the district judge.

Time and further insight proved the Steamboat Act inadequate. Probably its most serious shortcoming was the exemption of freightboats, ferries, tugboats, and towboats, which continued to operate under the superficial inspection requirements of the Act of 1838. However, the Steamboat Act was the beginning of legislation that would lead a federal inspection service.

== Act of February 28, 1871, and the creation of the Steamboat Inspection Service ==
Continued disasters and high loss of life again prompted congressional action through the passage of the Act of February 28, 1871. This new law applied to all steam vessels and sought to protect their crews as well as their passengers. It retained the useful functions of the Act of 1838 and the Steamboat Act and added new requirements that provided a comprehensive Marine Safety Code, which forms the basis of the present marine safety code.

The Act of 1871 created the Steamboat Inspection Service. Furthermore, it established a Supervisory Inspector General directly responsible to the United States Secretary of the Treasury, extended licensing requirements to all masters and chief mates, provided for the revocation of licenses, authorized periodic inspection, and gave the Board of Supervisory Inspectors the authority to prescribe nautical rules of the road.

== Transfers and reorganization ==
On February 14, 1903, congressional action transferred the Steamboat Inspection Service to the newly created United States Department of Commerce and Labor. When that department was split in 1913, the service came under the control of the new United States Department of Commerce.

On June 30, 1932, Congress passed a law (47 Stat. L., 415) under which the Steamboat Inspection Service lost its independent identity and was merged with the Bureau of Navigation, which had been created in 1884 to oversee the regulation of merchant seamen. The merger formed the new Bureau of Navigation and Steamboat Inspection. The new organization remained within the Department of Commerce.

== Act of May 27, 1936 (Public Law 622) ==
The Morro Castle fire off the coast of New Jersey in 1934, which killed 124 people, paved the way for the Act of May 27, 1936. The law, known as Public Law 622, reorganized the Bureau of Navigation and Steamboat Inspection and renamed it the Bureau of Marine Inspection and Navigation (49 Stat. L., 1380). The Bureau remained under Department of Commerce control. Public Law 622 also required structural fire protection on passenger vessels and required plans for passenger vessels be approved by the Bureau prior to any vessel's construction.

== Motorboat Act of 1940 ==
The Motorboat Act of 1940 was enacted to cover safety requirements for every vessel propelled by machinery and not more than 65 feet (20 meters) in length, with the exception of tugboats and towboats of this length propelled by steam, which were covered under other laws. In addition to covering safety equipment, running lights, and reckless or negligent operations, this law gave the Bureau of Marine Inspection and Navigation the authority to examine the operators of these boats and issue licenses provided they carried passengers for hire.

== Executive Order 9083 ==
After the United States entered World War II, President Franklin D. Roosevelt as a wartime measure signed Executive Order 9083 on February 28, 1942. It transferred the Bureau of Marine Inspection and Navigation's inspection duties, among other things, temporarily to the control of the United States Coast Guard.

== Reorganization Plan Number 3 ==
On July 16, 1946, Reorganization Plan Number 3 abolished the Bureau of Marine Inspection and Navigation and transferred all of its functions permanently to the U.S. Coast Guard. This marked the first time in the nation's history that all functions of maritime safety came under one agency.

== Marine safety under the Coast Guard ==
The Marine Safety program is still administered by the Coast Guard, an agency originally under the control of the United States Department of the Treasury, later under the control of the United States Department of Transportation, and now under the control of the United States Department of Homeland Security. In an attempt to promote better service to the maritime industry as well as the general public, the marine inspection and Captain of the Port/port safety functions were combined. The marine inspectors of the Coast Guard come from varying backgrounds and careers. Among the officers in the program, some are graduates of the United States Coast Guard Academy, some are graduates of the various maritime academies, and some are prior civilians that attended Officer Candidate School. Many of the officers in this field, including all of the chief warrant officers in the field, are prior-enlisted Coast Guardsmen who have progressed through the enlisted ranks and earned commissions.

Due to an increase in small boat accidents, the Small Passenger Vessel Act of May 10, 1956, was passed into law. The requirements of this act became effective on June 1, 1958, and provided that all vessels, regardless of size or propulsion, carrying more than six passengers for hire, be inspected by a Marine Inspector of the Coast Guard, and meet associated safety requirements. These requirements not only cover life saving and fire fighting equipment, but also machinery and electrical installations, hull strength and stability considerations. This law required that operators be licensed by the Coast Guard and minimum manning requirements be met. Additionally, the route or routes on which the vessel may operate and the maximum number of passengers that may be carried are established by the Coast Guard.

== Summary history ==
Predecessor agencies to the Bureau of Marine Inspection and Navigation:

- In the Department of the Treasury:
  - Steamboat Inspection Service (1871–1903)
  - Bureau of Navigation (1884–1903)
- In the Department of Commerce and Labor:
  - Steamboat Inspection Service (1903–1913)
  - Bureau of Navigation (1903–1913)
- In the Department of Commerce:
  - Steamboat Inspection Service (1913–1932)
  - Bureau of Navigation (1913–1932)
  - Bureau of Navigation and Steamboat Inspection (1932–1936)

== See also ==
- Lloyd's Steamboat Directory
