= Organization of the United States Coast Guard =

This article covers the organization of the United States Coast Guard.

The headquarters of the Coast Guard is located at 2703 Martin Luther King Jr Avenue SE in Washington, D.C. The Coast Guard relocated to the grounds of the former St. Elizabeths Hospital in 2013.

== Flag officers ==
=== Admiral ===
Flag of the Commandant of the United States Coast Guard

The commandant of the Coast Guard is the Coast Guard's most senior officer, who, by law, holds the rank of admiral. The commandant is selected for a four-year term, which may be renewed for additional four-year periods. The acting commandant is Admiral Kevin E. Lunday, who replaced Admiral Linda L. Fagan on January 21, 2025 after Fagan was relieved before the end of her term.

Flag of the Vice Commandant of the United States Coast Guard

The vice commandant of the Coast Guard is Admiral Kevin E. Lunday, who replaced Admiral Steven D. Poulin on June 13, 2024.

=== Vice admiral ===
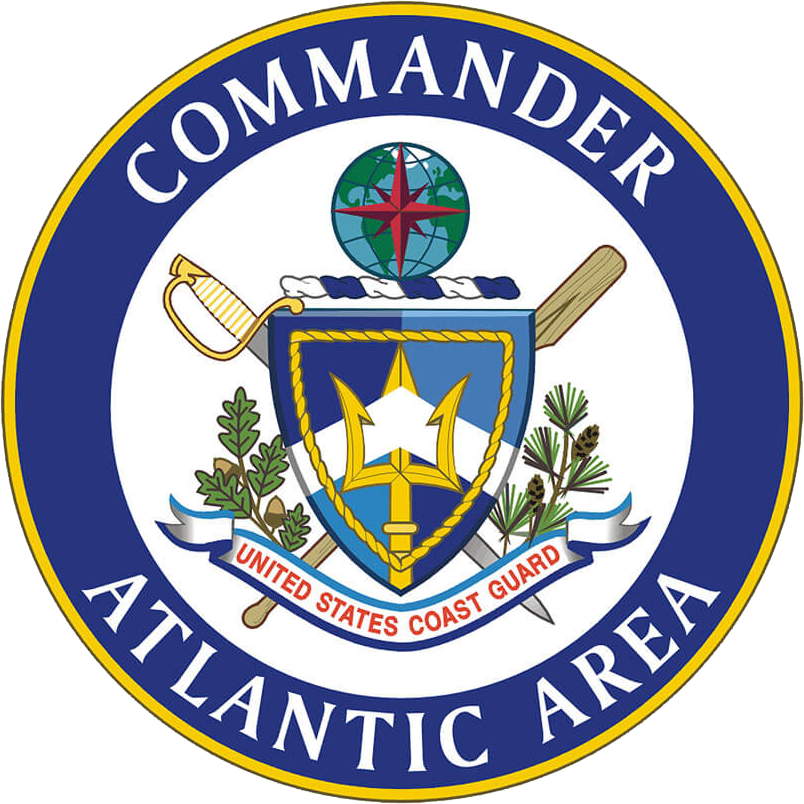
Atlantic area emblem

Pacific area emblem

The commander of the Atlantic Area is Vice Admiral Nathan A. Moore.

The acting commander of the Pacific Area is Rear Admiral Joseph R. Buzzella.

The acting deputy commandant for operations is Rear Admiral Shannon N. Gilreath.

The deputy commandant for mission support is Vice Admiral Thomas G. Allan Jr.

=== Rear admiral and rear admiral (lower half) ===
There are approximately 48 rear admirals in the Coast Guard who are either in the rank of rear admiral or rear admiral (lower half). Positions held by rear admirals include the commanders of each of the nine Coast Guard Districts, the nine assistant commandants, and the deputies to each of the vice admirals. They are also located at Coast Guard Headquarters, Department of Defense commands, and other Coast Guard commands.

The superintendent of the United States Coast Guard Academy is Rear Admiral Michael J. Johnston.

The Coast Guard also utilizes members of the civilian Senior Executive Service (SES) to serve as executives within the organization. There are approximately 18 SES officials in the Coast Guard as of Fiscal Year 2017.

=== Commodore (title) ===
The rank of commodore is no longer used in the Coast Guard. The equivalent rank used today is rear admiral (lower half). The title of commodore is occasionally granted to senior officers (typically of pay grade O-6, which is a captain) who are placed in command of a group or squadron of cutters. It is not a flag rank, but rather a title used to signify command of multiple units afloat.

The chief elected officers of the Coast Guard Auxiliary are also referred to as commodores, signifying their senior elected office, rather than a military rank.

== Senior officers ==
=== Captain ===
Coast Guard captains, like their Navy counterparts, rank immediately below rear admiral (lower half). Coast Guard captains command most large operational units—sectors, large cutters, large air stations, integrated support commands, training centers and large headquarters units. Captains also direct most headquarters, area and district staff elements. Most captains have served in the Coast Guard for 21 to 30 years.

By maritime tradition, the commanding officer of a ship is also called "captain", regardless of actual rank held. Thus, a young junior officer commanding a patrol boat is properly called "captain" even if his or her actual rank is lieutenant, or lieutenant (junior grade). This tradition has also carried over to many shore units. Occasionally, terms like "old man" and "skipper" are also used, though not usually in the presence of the "captain". However, in current usage, the person in charge of a Coast Guard or Coast Guard Auxiliary small boat is the "coxswain" (pronounced cok-sun).

=== Commander ===
Coast Guard commanders (Pay grade O-5) may head departments in large operational units or staff positions, or they may be the commanding officer of a medium-sized unit. The term commander is also associated with specific commanding officer positions, such as sector commander (usually a captain) or district commander (usually a rear admiral).

== Junior officers ==
The other commissioned officer ranks are (from most senior to least senior)

- Lieutenant commander: Examples of positions held by a lieutenant commander include command of some Coast Guard cutters, executive officers of larger cutters, or departmental oversight positions at Coast Guard Sector commands.
- Lieutenant: Examples of positions held by a lieutenant include command of small boat stations, command of Coast Guard patrol boats, and as operations officers or engineering officers aboard larger Coast Guard cutters.
- Lieutenant (junior grade): Examples of positions held by a lieutenant (junior grade) include command of Coast Guard patrol boats, executive officers of patrol boats, small boat stations, or as assistant operations officers aboard larger Coast Guard cutters.
- Ensign. Examples of positions held by an ensign include training billets as deck watch officers aboard large cutters, student engineers aboard large cutters, and staff positions at Coast Guard Sector commands.

== Chief warrant officers ==
The Coast Guard has three active grades of chief warrant officers. Chief warrant officers are commissioned officers, and are promoted from senior enlisted ranks. The grade of warrant officer (WO1) is not used in the Coast Guard. Although authorized in 1994, the Coast Guard does not currently use or have any active CWO5 grade. The three grades in use are (from most senior to least senior):

- Chief warrant officer 4
- Chief warrant officer 3
- Chief warrant officer 2

An example of a position held by a chief warrant officer is commanding officer of a small cutter, such as USCGC Abbie Burgess.

A chief warrant officer is not addressed as "chief"; that title that is normally reserved for the enlisted rank of chief petty officer (E-7). The proper way to address a chief warrant officer is to refer to their title (CWO, CWO3) or to address them as "Mr." or "Ms."

Due to the small and decentralized nature of the service, Coast Guard warrant officers often fill command roles. Warrant officers may serve as officers-in-charge of Coast Guard Stations, or as Command warrant officers.

== Chief petty officers ==
As in the Navy, Coast Guardsmen in the rates of chief petty officer (E-7), senior chief petty officer (E-8), and master chief petty officer (E-9), are collectively called "chiefs," and serve as the service's senior non-commissioned officers. The Coast Guard is often short of officers, therefore chiefs often fill roles that would normally be filled by commissioned officers in other branches. Chiefs serve as officers-in-charge of Coast Guard Stations and recruiting offices, command or serve as engineering petty officers on smaller cutters, and act as department heads on larger cutters.

Heath B. Jones is the current Master Chief Petty Officer of the Coast Guard (MCPOCG) and is the senior enlisted person of the Coast Guard and serves as an advisor to the Commandant. Like the Commandant, the MCPOCG serves a four-year term.

== Regional responsibilities - Areas, Districts, and Sectors ==
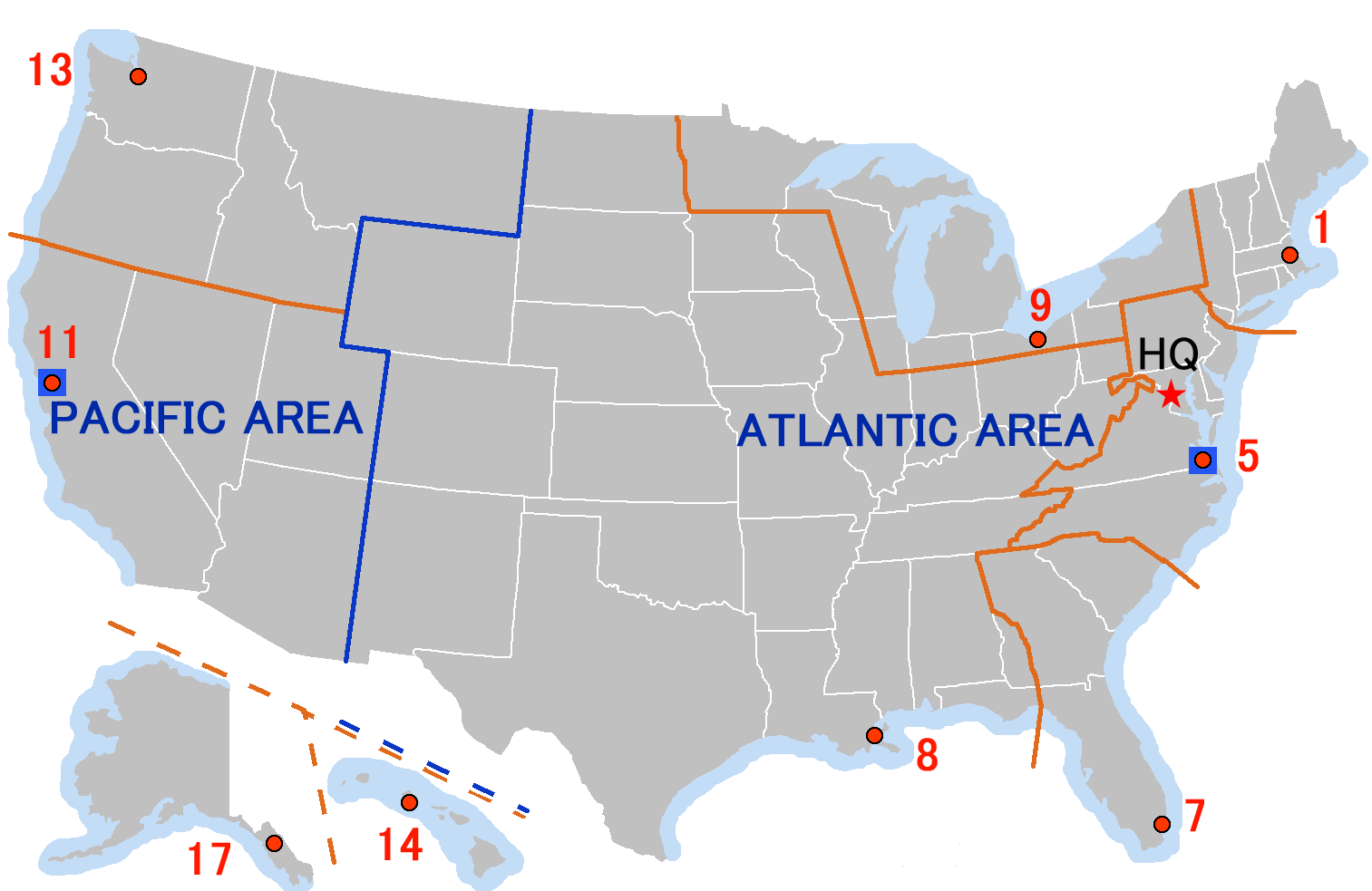

Since most Coast Guard operations are domestic, the service has always been organized along regional lines. The Coast Guard's shore establishment divides the continental United States and its territories into two area commands--Coast Guard Atlantic Area and Coast Guard Pacific Area—each commanded by a vice admiral. The area commands are divided into districts, each commanded by a rear admiral and responsible for a portion of the nation's coastline and/or inland waterways. Each district is further divided into sectors. Sectors are the primary organizational unit for many of the duties the public most closely identifies with the Coast Guard, such coordinating search and rescue missions and conducting law enforcement operations.

Individual operational units report at various levels within this three-tiered organizational structure. For example, small boat stations report to Sector Commanders while air stations report to District Commanders; both sectors and air stations are typically commanded by a captain.

Cutters are not organized into standing fleets as in most naval forces. Instead, individual cutters report to shore establishment commanders at various levels. Generally speaking, the larger the cutter, the higher up the chain the cutter reports. For example, USCGC William Trump (WPC-1111), a Sentinel-class cutter based in Key West, Florida, reports to Coast Guard Sector Key West, while USCGC Thetis (WMEC-910), a larger Famous-class cutter also based in Key West, reports to the Atlantic Area Commander.

Additionally, there are three major operational commands located outside the United States:

- USCG Far East Activities (FEACT) is located at Yokota Air Base, Japan. FEACT also commands Port Security Unit’s which deploy to South Korea, helping to support U.S. Naval Forces Korea. FEACT helps inspects U.S. ships overseas and foreign ships that will be operating in the Pacific. FEACT helps by providing Maritime Safety, Security, Training and International Support.
- USCG Activities Europe (ACTEUR) is located in Schinnen, The Netherlands.
- Patrol Forces Southwest Asia (PATFORSWA) is based out of Manama, Bahrain. Established in 2002, the mission of PATFORSWA is to train, organize, equip, support and deploy combat-ready Coast Guard forces in support of CENTCOM and national security objectives.

U.S. Coast Guard Districts
District	Area	District Office	Area of Responsibility	Note
Northeast (former First District)	Atlantic	Boston, Massachusetts	New England states, eastern New York and northern New Jersey	1
East (former Fifth District)	Atlantic	Portsmouth, Virginia	Pennsylvania, southern New Jersey, Delaware, Maryland, Virginia, and North Carolina	5
Southeast (former Seventh District)	Atlantic	Miami, Florida	South Carolina, Georgia, eastern Florida, Puerto Rico, and the U.S. Virgin Islands	7
Heartland (former Eighth District)	Atlantic	New Orleans, Louisiana	Western Rivers of the U.S. and the Gulf of Mexico	8
Great Lakes (former Ninth District)	Atlantic	Cleveland, Ohio	Great Lakes	9
Southwest (former Eleventh District)	Pacific	Alameda, California	California, Arizona, Nevada, and Utah	11
Northwest (former Thirteenth District)	Pacific	Seattle, Washington	Oregon, Washington, Idaho and Montana	13
Oceania (former Fourteenth District)	Pacific	Honolulu, Hawaii	Hawaii and Pacific territories	14
Arctic (former Seventeenth District)	Pacific	Juneau, Alaska	Alaska	17

== Coast Guard Sectors ==
Within each District, large operational shore-side units known as Sectors are responsible for mission execution within their area of responsibility. Sectors were formed when "groups" were merged with what were formerly known as Marine Safety Offices. Coast Guard small boat stations are called Stations and report to Sectors. Each Sector Commander reports to the appropriate District Commander.

== Coast Guard Air Stations ==
Coast Guard Air Stations provide aviation support for other Coast Guard activities. Unlike small boat stations, air stations are not subordinate to Sector commanders. Instead the commanding officer of a Coast Guard Air Station reports to the appropriate District Commander.

== Staff elements ==
Acquisition Directorate (CG-9) seal

Staff elements directorates are each headed by an Assistant Commandant or Director. Each directorate reports to the Deputy Commandant for Operations or the Deputy Commandant for Mission Support. A handful, such as the Judge Advocate General, report directly to the Commandant/Vice-Commandant.

On July 23, 2007, the Coast Guard instituted a consolidated acquisition directorate, which handles major systems and future equipment acquisitions. It is the second-largest staff element at Coast Guard headquarters. Rear Admiral Michael J. Johnston, Assistant Commandant for Acquisition, leads the directorate. The directorate’s programs include all platforms and mission systems designed to modernize and recapitalize the Coast Guard’s fleet of cutters, boats, aircraft, and information technology assets. Under the new organization, these programs are consolidated from the legacy Coast Guard acquisitions directorate and the Integrated Deepwater System Program. The new directorate also brings together the office of procurement management; the office of research, development and technical management; the Research and Development Center; and the head of contracting.

== Other ==
The Curatorial Services Office (CG-92) is located in Forestville, Maryland which includes the U.S. Coast Guard Exhibit Center.
