= DHS Border and Maritime Security Division =

Division of the United States Department of Homeland Security

Agency overview
- Formed: 2003
- Jurisdiction: United States
- Headquarters: DHS Nebraska Avenue Complex, Washington D.C.
- Agency executive: Mrs. Anh N. Duong, Director
- Parent agency: DHS Science and Technology Directorate
- Website: DHS Border and Maritime Security Division

The Border and Maritime Security Division (BMD) is a division of the Science and Technology Directorate of the United States Department of Homeland Security. Within the Homeland Security Advanced Research Projects Agency, BMD develops tools and technologies that improve the security of the United States's land borders and waterways.

== Focus ==
The 2007 High Priority Technical Needs Brochure published by Homeland Security defines critical focus areas for Border and Maritime research, falling primarily under the categories of border security, cargo security and maritime security.

=== Border security ===
- Improved ballistic protection via personal protective equipment
- Improve detection, tracking, and identification of all threats along the terrestrial and maritime border
- Non-lethal compliance measures for vehicles, vessels, or aircraft allowing for safe interdiction by law enforcement personnel
- Non-destructive tools that allow for the inspection of hidden or closed compartments to find contraband or security threats
- Improved analysis and decision-making tools that will ensure the development/implementation of border security initiatives
- Ability for law enforcement personnel to quickly identify the origin of gunfire and classify the type of weapon fired
- Ability for law enforcement officers to assure compliance of lawful orders using non-lethal means

=== Cargo security ===
- Enhanced screening and examination by non-intrusive inspection
- Increased information fusion, anomaly detection, Automatic Target Recognition capability
- Detect and identify WMD materials and contraband
- Capability to screen 100% of air cargo
- Test the feasibility of seal security; Detection of intrusion
- Track domestic high-threat cargo
- Harden air cargo conveyances and containers
- Positive ID of cargo & detection

=== Maritime security ===
- Wide-area surveillance from the coast to beyond the horizon; port and inland waterways region - detect, ID, and track
- Data fusion and automated tools for command center operations
- Vessel compliance through non-lethal compliance methods
- Enhanced capability to continuously track contraband on ships or containers
- Improved ballistic personal protective equipment for officer safety
- Improved WMD detection equipment for officer safety; improved screening capability for WMD for maritime security checkpoints
