= Marine safety (USCG) =

United States Coast Guard

Marine safety is one of the eleven missions of the United States Coast Guard.

Coast Guard personnel inspect commercial vessels, respond to pollution, investigate marine casualties and merchant mariners, manage waterways, and license merchant mariners. Coast Guard officials also draft recommendations for the transit of hazardous cargo by ship, such as liquid natural gas.

In addition to this mission, the Coast Guard carries out investigations to determine the cause of accidents on American-flagged (Flag State) ships or foreign ships in American waters (Port State).

Among the activities of the Coast Guard is inspection of commercial boats carrying passengers for hire. Vessels carrying more than six passengers must show a Certificate of Inspection; this indicates the crews of such vessels have undergone drug testing, that the vessel's firefighting and lifesaving equipment is adequate and in good condition, and machinery, hull construction, wiring, stability, safety railings, and navigation equipment meet Federal standards.

== Overview ==
The Coast Guard performs its marine safety mission by conducting marine inspection, marine investigation, waterways management, port safety, and merchant mariner credentialing activities. The marine safety mission is the largest mission performed by Prevention Departments at Coast Guard Sectors. Coast Guard personnel that contribute to the marine safety program at field units are eligible to earn the Marine Safety Insignia.

== Marine inspection ==
The Coast Guard is responsible for inspecting vessels (e.g., boats or ships) that are registered in the United States or are foreign ships in U.S. waters.

The Coast Guard delegates this responsibility to the Officer in Charge, Marine Inspection.

Inspections are done either under Flag State responsibility or Port State responsibility. The four basic categories of vessels subject to inspection are:

- Passenger vessels.
  - This category of vessel includes crew boats, nautical school vessels, cruise ships, excursion vessels, charter fishing boats, etc., carrying more than six passengers.
- Tank vessels.
  - This category of vessel includes tank ships and tank barges.
- Cargo vessels.
  - This category of vessel includes container vessels, freight vessels, roll on/roll off (RO/RO), etc.
- Special use vessels.
  - This category of vessel includes mobile offshore drilling units (MODU) offshore supply vessels (OSV), oceanographic research vessel (ORV), oil spill response vessel (OSRV), nautical school vessels, sailing school vessels, etc.

There are two kinds of inspections: Safety and Security.

Inspections of vessel safety systems includes the following:

- Hull inspection to ensure seaworthiness of vessel.
- Main/auxiliary power inspection to ensure safe and operable machinery for vessel propulsion and emergency power.
- Boiler inspection to ensure that it is structurally sound with operable safety devices.
- Electrical systems inspection to ensure satisfactory installation of wiring and equipment.
- Lifesaving systems inspection to ensure satisfactory and adequate means to abandon ship.
- Firefighting systems inspection to ensure fixed and portable devices are suitable for the intended space and type of fire.
- Navigation inspection to ensure adequacy and operation of navigation equipment.
- Pollution prevention inspection to ensure compliance with international regulations and domestic laws.

Inspections of vessel security systems includes the following:

- Verification of security related documents and certificates such as the ship security plan, International Ship Security Certificate and Declaration of Security.
- Ensure appropriate training drills, and exercises are being conducted.
- Ensure required on board security procedures are in place.

== Marine investigation ==
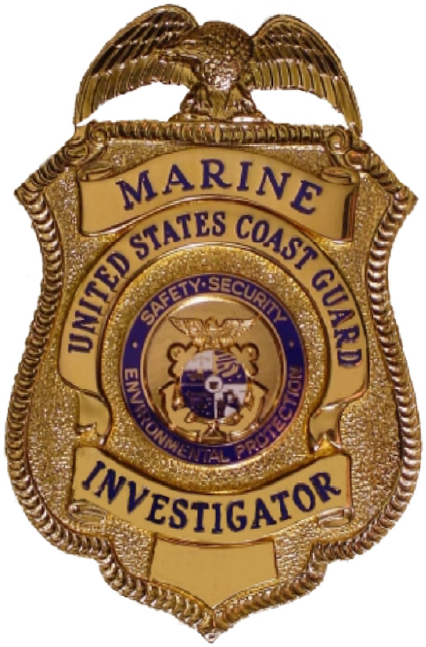
Coast Guard Marine Investigator Badge

The Coast Guard investigates marine casualties and allegations of improper Merchant Mariner actions to determine cause, and to prevent future occurrences under its Marine Safety mission. There are two kinds of investigations: Marine casualty investigations, and personnel actions.

=== Marine casualty investigations ===
Marine casualty investigations are carried out for the following:

- Death of an individual.
- Serious injury to an individual.
- Material loss of property.
- Material damage affecting the seaworthiness or efficiency of the vessel.
- Significant harm to the environment.

=== Personnel actions ===
Investigations are also conducted to determine if personnel actions by licensed or documented merchant mariners constitute one or more of the following:

- Misconduct.
- Negligence.
- Incompetence.
- Violation of law or regulation.

These investigations may result in a suspension and revocation action, which is an administrative process to determine the fitness of an individual to retain or continue to operate under the authority of his/her merchant Mariner document or license. These hearings are not criminal proceedings but rather administrative in nature.

== Waterways management ==
The program manages, influences, and provides access to a safe, secure, efficient and environmentally sound waterways system by providing marine safety information to the public, processing marine event permits, bridge administration and marine transportation system services.

== Port safety ==
The port safety function has a long history in the Coast Guard. It was expanded during the 20th century to include the protection of ports, harbors, vessels, and waterfront facilities against accidents, negligence, and sabotage. These responsibilities have been assigned to the COTP primarily through the Ports and Waterways Safety Act of 1972. This Act resulted from several major groundings and oil spills and provided port safety authority for the COTP to protect the use of port transportation facilities, and to enhance efforts against the degradation of the marine environment.

The port safety mission is primarily concerned with the prevention of accidental damage to ports, facilities, and ships in order to protect the environment and facilitate commerce.

The major activities that support the Port Safety mission include:

- Pollution prevention.
- Pollution investigation.
- Harbor patrols and surveillance.
- Contingency planning.
- Drills and exercises.
- Monitoring of liquid and hazardous cargo transfers.
- Monitoring of fuel transfers.
- Container inspections.
- Facilities inspections.
- Explosive cargo loading supervision.

The Captain can close a port and direct private vessels to depart or take protective measures if necessary, such as to prepare for a hurricane.

While port safety is concerned with accidents that harm people or property, port security (as a part of maritime security) is concerned with deliberate acts intended to harm people or property.

== Merchant mariner credentialing ==
In the United States, the Coast Guard is responsible for evaluating, certifying, and credentialing U.S. merchant mariners. All mariners receive a Merchant Mariner Credential from the Coast Guard, and are also required to obtain a Transportation Worker Identification Credential from the Transportation Security Administration.
