= NVMC =

NVMC may refer to:

- Nassau Veterans Memorial Coliseum, a multi-purpose indoor arena in Uniondale, New York, on Long Island
- National Vessel Movement Center, a military subdivision of the United States Coast Guard
