= United States Coast Guard sector =

Shore-based operational unit of the United States Coast Guard

A Sector is a shore-based operational unit of the United States Coast Guard. Each Sector is responsible for the execution of all Coast Guard missions within its Area of Responsibility (AOR), with operational support from Coast Guard Cutters and Air Stations. Subordinate commands within a Sector typically include Stations and Aids-to-Navigation (ATON) Teams. Some Sector commands also have subordinate units such as Sector Field Offices and Marine Safety Units that are responsible for mission execution in parts of the Sector's AOR. There are 36 sectors within the Coast Guard. As of 2025 all numbered sectors and units went away and were replaced with names.

== History ==
Sectors replaced Coast Guard Groups, Marine Safety Offices (MSO), Activities, and Vessel Traffic Services (VTS). Previously, a Group and its units provided Search and Rescue (SAR), maritime law enforcement, recreational boating safety, and maintained aids to navigation. MSOs enforced federal laws and regulations related to the safety and security of vessels, port facilities, and the marine environment, and assisted other law enforcement agencies. The new Sector organizations are based on the Activities prototype commands established in 1996 in New York and Baltimore, and (later) San Diego. The Activities units were praised for their efficiency and unity of effort in the aftermath of the 9/11 attacks.

Before 2004, field operations in a single port fell under multiple, mission-based commands (Group, MSO, and VTS) that were physically dispersed, had unique chains of command and different program managers at Coast Guard Headquarters, lacked a consistent voice to the public, and had some mission overlap. The attacks of September 11 called for a new Coast Guard unity of effort that was cumbersome to achieve using the previous multiple command port-level structure. The Coast Guard’s move from the Department of Transportation to the Department of Homeland Security and implementation of the Maritime Transportation Security Act of 2002 (MTSA) provided further impetus to restructure.

In 2003, the Coast Guard began to consolidate field activities for its Commercial Vessel Safety, Port and Environmental Safety, Marine Environmental Response, Port Security, Waterways Management, Bridge Administration, Search and Rescue (SAR), Recreational Boating Safety missions under one local Sector Command. The organizational change to Sectors eliminated the historical segregation of prevention and response activities at the local level and created a comprehensive unit that brings together field activities, authorities, and resources to provide the most effective organization and the best value to the public.

The Sector Command combines responsibilities and authorities previously shared by two or more commands into a single operational unit with a command and senior staff of highly competent experts.

The Coast Guard Sector provides for rapid, coordinated response to emergencies, whether natural (such as Hurricane Katrina) or man-made, along with integrated daily operations to enforce regulations governing marine safety, security, and environmental protection. In addition, it provides an immediate safety and security assessment at the onset of any maritime event, disaster, or casualty affords critical synergy to operations essential to marine safety, security, and environmental protection.

Coast Guard Sectors serve as one-stop-shops for marine safety, security, and environmental protection for major seaports and regions. They bring multi-mission capabilities to life on the front lines of the maritime environment, where Sector Commanders are afforded broad authority.

== Organization ==
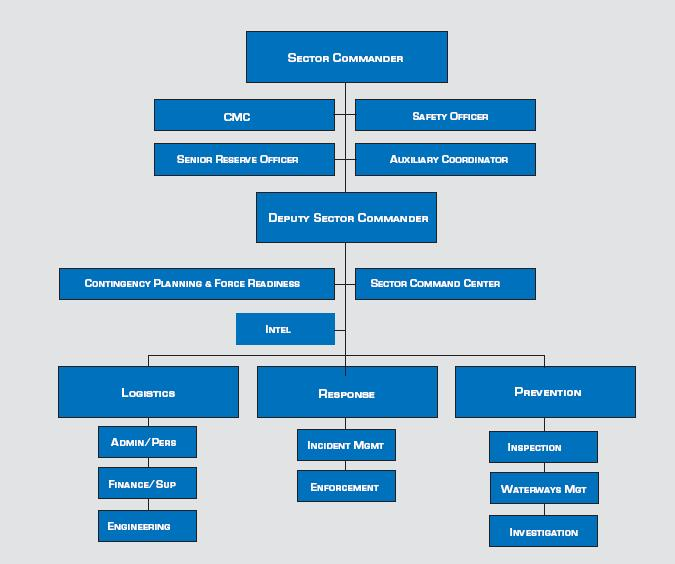
Diagram of the generic Sector organization

The Sector organizational construct represents a transformation from a Coast Guard traditionally organized around its operational programs to one organized around core operational service delivery processes. It focuses the coordinated efforts of all assigned operational capabilities to accomplish Coast Guard mission objectives.

=== Sector Commander ===
The commanding officer of a Sector is called the Sector Commander and is usually the rank of Captain. The Sector Commander holds the positions of Captain of the Port (COTP) and Federal Maritime Security Coordinator (FMSC). Unless otherwise assigned, the Sector Commander is also the Officer in Charge Marine Inspections (OCMI), Search and Rescue Mission Coordinator (SMC), and Federal On-Scene Coordinator (FOSC). The Sector Commander reports to the appropriate District Commander.

=== Command Staff ===
The Sector Commander's second-in-command is the Deputy Sector Commander. Also reporting directly to the Sector Commander are the:

- Command Master Chief (CMC)
- Senior Reserve Officer

==== Command Center ====
The Sector Command Center (SCC) is the center of Sector Operations. It provides 24-hour command, control, coordination, communications, intelligence, sensor analysis, and data mining (C4ISM). The SCC coordinates with other federal, state, and local operations centers, and issues Notices to Mariners, Situation Reports, and maritime security alerts. The SCC displays the current Common Operating Picture (COP) and Common Intelligence Picture (CIP), including a presentation of all vessels, aircraft, communications equipment, and personnel belonging to the Coast Guard and supporting agencies.

==== Emergency Management and Force Preparedness ====
The Emergency Management and Force Readiness Staff develops and maintains plans covering readiness, logistics, and emergency preparedness. It coordinates with the three departments in plan development and execution, and plans and executes readiness exercises to test contingency plans. The Emergency Management branch also monitors the training and readiness of Sector Reserve Forces and manages their mobilization and demobilization. The Emergency Management and Force Readiness staff also manages the federally mandated Area and Area Maritime Security Committees around the nation.

==== Intel ====
The Intelligence Staff's mission to collect, evaluate, report, and disseminate operational intelligence within the Sector. This staff serves as the primary intelligence support element for all operations within the Sector. Intel forwards its analysis of raw intelligence reports to the District and the Atlantic or Pacific Maritime Intelligence Fusion Center, and is the critical link between the Sector Commander and the entire Coast Guard intelligence enterprise, which is in turn a part of the United States Intelligence Community.

=== Response ===
The Response Department contains two Divisions:

- Incident Management Division: Addresses unit search & rescue policy, pollution response, and all-hazards incident management.
- Enforcement Division: Provides administration and oversight to the Coast Guard Boat Stations and Cutters that enforce U.S. law and execute the service's Ports, Waterways & Coastal Security (PWCS) enforcement activities, such as armed boardings, vessel escorts and security zone enforcement. This division works closely with federal, state, and local law enforcement and sister agencies within the DHS to respond to and mitigate the impact of maritime threats.

=== Prevention ===
The Prevention Department consists of three divisions.

- Inspections Division: Manages and oversees the regulatory and inspection aspects of the Coast Guard’s safety, security, and environmental protection responsibilities for vessels and facilities.
- Waterways Management Division: Controls aids to navigation; safety and security zones; Regulated Navigation Areas; ice breaking; and VTS.
- Investigations Division: Initiates inquiries into marine casualties, boating violations, and assessment of civil penalties.

=== Logistics ===
The Logistics Department performs unit level maintenance and organic engineering, personnel, medical support, and finance/supply functions for the entire Sector.

- Engineering/Support Division: Administers electronics and computer system, naval, aviation, vehicle, and facilities engineering; armory and small arms qualification; and environmental compliance. The associated Integrated Support Command or Aircraft Repair and Supply Center handle intermediate and depot level maintenance.
- Administrative/Personnel Division: Handles medical, training, housing, and educational services.
- Finance/Supply Division: Encompasses galley, transportation, and property and inventory management.

== List of Coast Guard Sectors ==
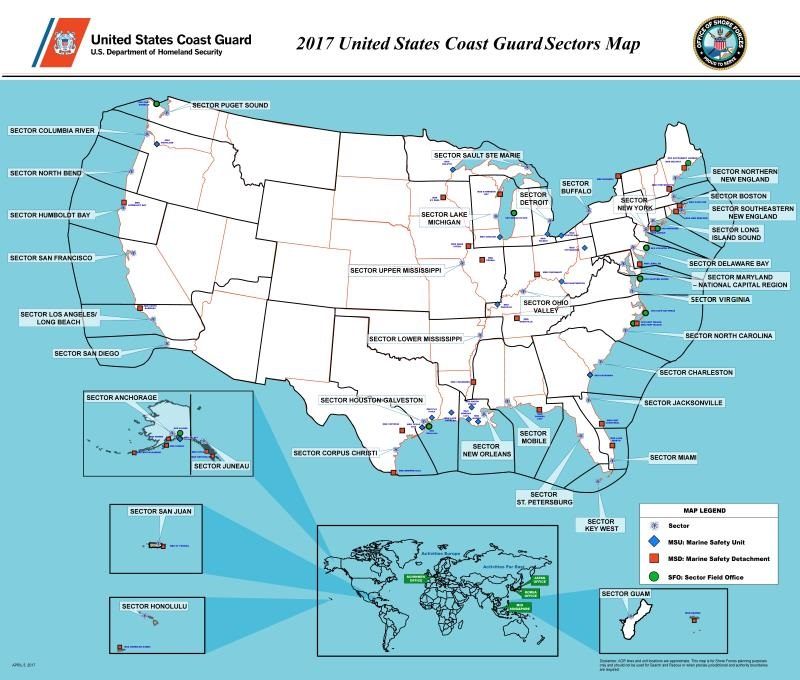
Map of Sectors across the United States. Sector North Bend was disestablished in 2023.

=== Atlantic Area ===
District	District Logo	Sector	Location of Sector command
Northeast		Sector Northern New England	South Portland, Maine
Northeast		Sector Boston	Boston, Massachusetts
Northeast		Sector Southeast New England	Woods Hole, Massachusetts
Northeast		Sector Long Island Sound	New Haven, Connecticut
Northeast		Sector New York	Staten Island, New York
East		Sector Delaware Bay	Philadelphia, Pennsylvania
East		Sector Maryland-National Capital Region	Baltimore, Maryland
East		Sector Virginia	Portsmouth, Virginia
East		Sector North Carolina	Atlantic Beach, North Carolina
Southeast		Sector Charleston	Charleston, South Carolina
Southeast		Sector Jacksonville	Jacksonville, Florida
Southeast		Sector Miami	Miami, Florida
Southeast		Sector Key West	Key West, Florida
Southeast		Sector St. Petersburg	St. Petersburg, Florida
Southeast		Sector San Juan	San Juan, Puerto Rico
Heartland		Sector Ohio Valley	Louisville, Kentucky
Heartland		Sector Upper Mississippi	St. Louis, Missouri
Heartland		Sector Lower Mississippi	Memphis, Tennessee
Heartland		Sector Mobile	Mobile, Alabama
Heartland		Sector New Orleans	New Orleans, Louisiana
Heartland		Sector Houston-Galveston	Houston, Texas
Heartland		Sector Corpus Christi	Corpus Christi, Texas
Great Lakes		Sector Eastern Great Lakes (Note: Formed as Sector Buffalo in July 2005 by merging Group Buffalo, Marine Safety Office Buffalo, and Marine Safety Office Cleveland. Renamed in December 2023.)	Buffalo, New York
Great Lakes		Sector Detroit	Detroit, Michigan
Great Lakes		Sector Lake Michigan	Milwaukee, Wisconsin
Great Lakes		Sector Northern Great Lakes (Note: Formed as Sector Sault Sainte Marie in June 2005 by merging Group Sault Sainte Marie and Marine Safety Office Sault Sainte Marie. Renamed in 2023.)	Sault Ste. Marie, Michigan

=== Pacific Area ===
District	District Logo	Sector	Location of Sector command
Southwest		Sector San Francisco	San Francisco, California
Southwest		Sector Humboldt Bay	McKinleyville, California
Southwest		Sector Los Angeles - Long Beach	San Pedro, California
Southwest		Sector San Diego	San Diego, California
Northwest		Sector Puget Sound	Seattle, Washington
Northwest		Sector Columbia River (Note: Sector North Bend was disestablished in May 2023 and the headquarters for Sector Columbia River were moved from Astoria to Portland.)	Portland, Oregon
Oceania		Sector Honolulu	Honolulu, Hawaii
Oceania		Sector Guam	Santa Rita, Guam
Arctic		Sector Western Alaska & U.S. Arctic (Note: Formerly Sector Anchorage; moved from Anchorage in 2014 and renamed in 2024.)	Joint Base Elmendorf-Richardson
Arctic		Sector Southeast Alaska	Juneau, Alaska

== See also ==
- United States Coast Guard
- Organization of the United States Coast Guard
- U.S. Coast Guard Cutters
- U.S. Coast Guard Air Stations
- Category:United States Coast Guard bases
