= Harbourmaster =

Official responsible for enforcement of port regulations

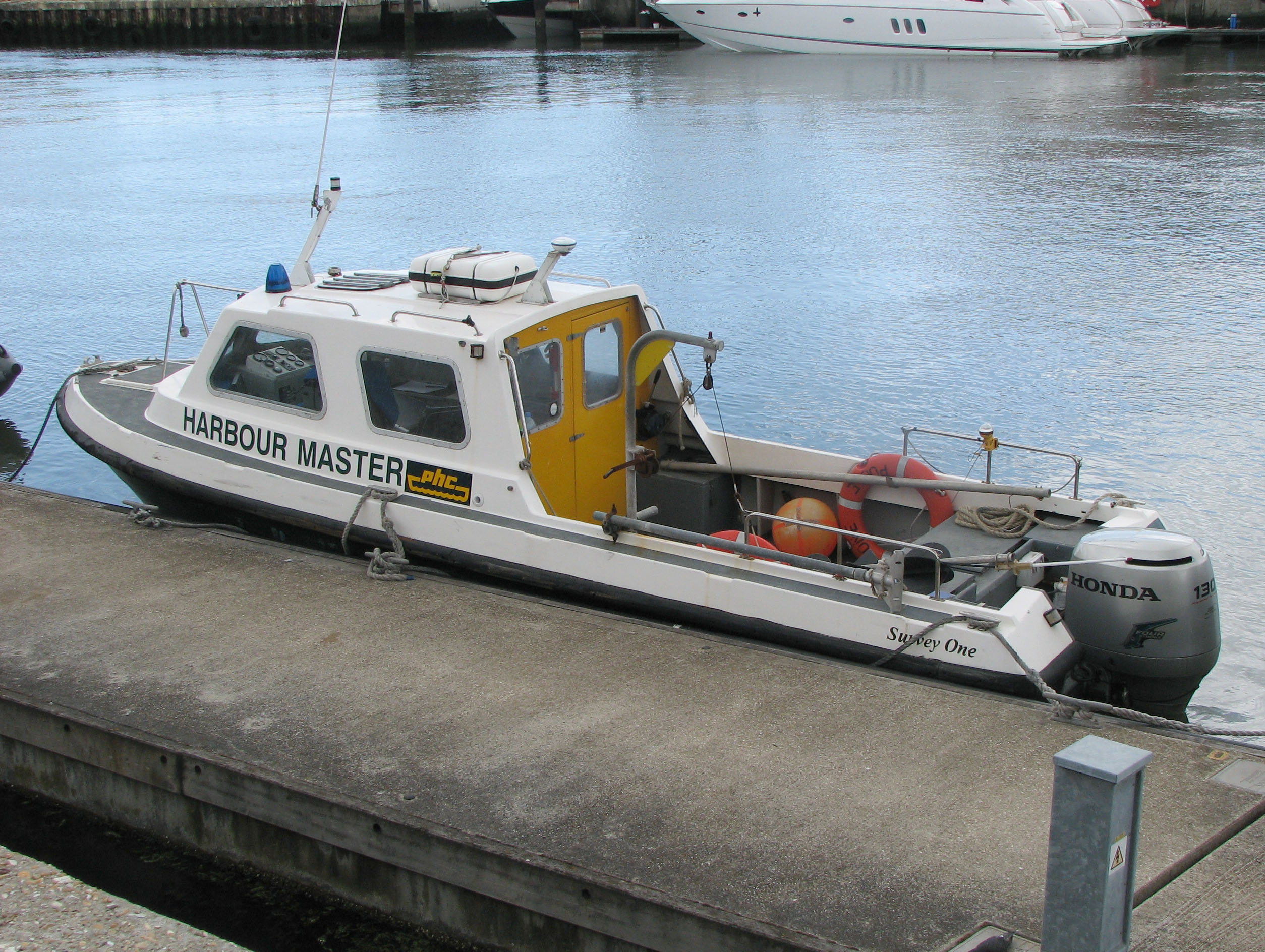
The Harbour Master’s transport at Poole, Dorset, England

A harbourmaster (or harbormaster, see spelling differences) is an official responsible for enforcing the regulations of a particular harbour or port, in order to ensure the safety of navigation, the security of the harbour and the correct operation of the port facilities. They are also typically responsible for protection of the marine environment in the port/harbour, as well as in ensuring adequate maritime pilots for ships according to the regulations of the harbour, where they may empower deputy or assistance harbour masters to assist them. Their responsibility typically extends to all jetties, marinas, quays and terminals with their designated port/harbour.

== Responsibilities ==
Harbourmasters are normally responsible for issuing local safety information sometimes known as notice to mariners.

They may also oversee the maintenance and provision of navigational aids within the port, co-ordinate responses to emergencies, inspect vessels and oversee pilotage services.

The harbourmaster may have legal power to detain, caution or even arrest persons committing an offence within the port or tidal range of the port's responsibilities. An example of this is the team of harbourmasters employed by the Port of London Authority who are empowered to undertake an enforcement role.

Actions that a harbourmaster may investigate include criminal acts, immigration, customs and excise, maritime and river safety and environmental and pollution issues. The police, customs, coastguard or immigration authorities will take over the handling of any offenders or incident once informed by the harbourmaster.

Worldwide there are approximately 3,000 merchant ports and the work of the Harbour Master can vary widely from country to country and from port to port even within the same country.

== Civilian and naval officers ==
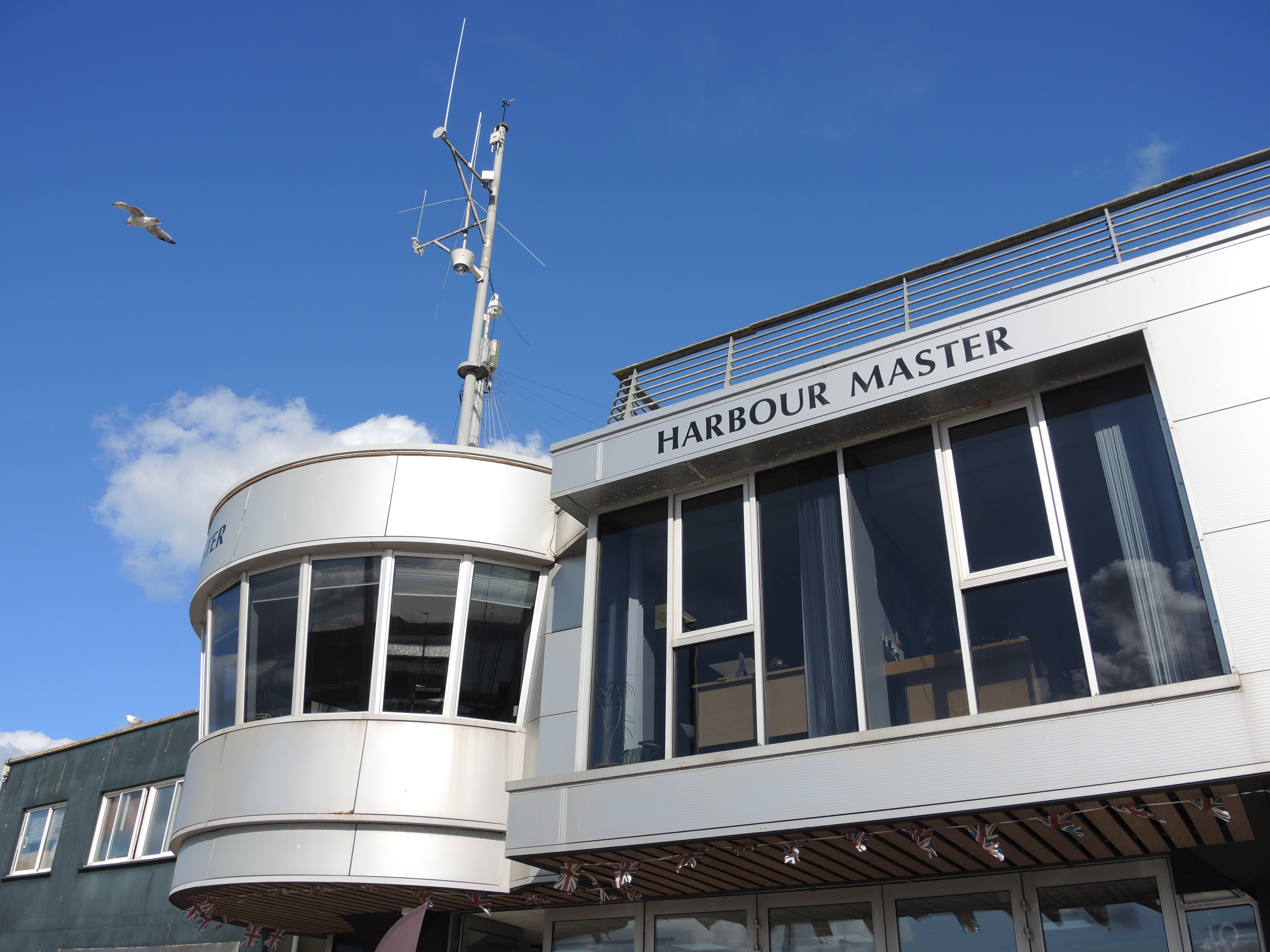
Harbour Master's office, Torquay, UK

A harbourmaster may either be a civilian or a commissioned naval officer of any rank.

Historically all harbourmasters were naval officers; even today they must possess prior seafaring knowledge and experience through serving with either a merchant navy or armed navy.

The terms naval and civilian are used here to distinguish who is employed by a military force and who is employed by a public or private port.

=== Netherlands ===
In the Netherlands, a civilian harbour master exercises authority over an individual port, including those of Rotterdam and Amsterdam, being responsible for regulation and maritime pilots.

=== United Kingdom and Canada ===
In the UK, harbour masters can be civilian or military. For example, in the River Clyde, Scotland, the Clydeport and Peel Ports Harbour Master is a civilian who exercises authority over commercial shipping while the KHM Clyde (King's Harbour Master Clyde) exercises authority over naval vessels and the waters around HMNB Clyde.

In the United Kingdom and Canada, a person that is appointed to superintend a dockyard port and ensures the port is secure for civilian and military shipping is known as a King's Harbour Master (or Queen's Harbour Master during the reign of a queen). In Canada, the position is also called a capitaine de port de Sa Majesté in French (lit. 'His Majesty's Captain of the Port'). Although legislation does not require it, most KHMs are officers from the naval service. King's Harbour Masters are entitled to fly their own flag. The flag flown by British KHMs is a white-bordered Union Flag with a white central disc bearing the initials "KHM" beneath a crown. Canadian KHMs fly a similar flag, a white-bordered flag of Canada with a white central disc bearing the initials "K.H.M." above the crown and "C.P.S.M. below it.

Commercial or statutory port authorities may also designate and empower a civilian harbour master. Under the Harbours, Docks and Piers Clauses Act 1847 the harbour master is assigned powers allowing them to "remove any Wreck or other Obstruction to the Harbour, Dock, or Pier, or the Approaches to the same." The port harbour master may also give directions for the regulations of vessels going in or out of the harbour, as well as their positions in the harbour and whether they can land passengers, cargo or take on ballast water in the harbour.

=== United States ===
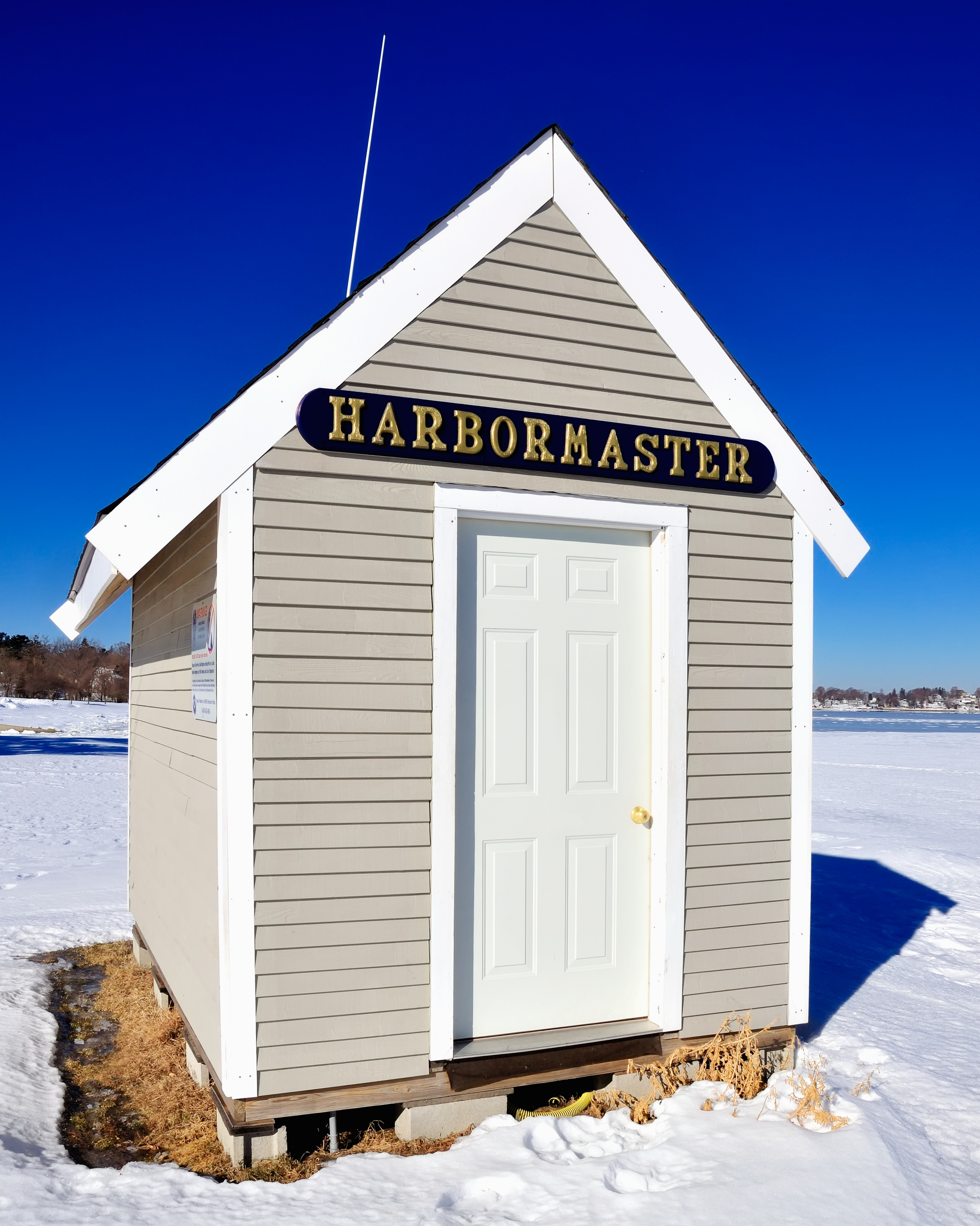
Harbormaster's shanty, Hingham harbor, US

In the United States, the captain of the port, a United States Coast Guard officer, is responsible for these duties in a predefined captain of the port zone which usually includes multiple ports and waterways leading to those ports, usually in federal waters. A US captain of the port, unlike the Canadian capitaine de port, is not normally considered to be a harbormaster, as harbormasters in the United States (as elsewhere) are usually local government officials responsible for safety and security in a harbor.

The directives of harbormasters are subject to the oversight of the Coast Guard.

US State laws typically set out requirements for harbor masters, eg Hawaii Code § 19-42-1, Code of the District of Columbia § 50–1541.24 and Code of Alabama § 33-3-5.

== Associations ==
Some countries have a harbourmasters membership association, which represents harbour masters around their respective country. The International Harbour Masters Association (IHMA) is the international representative body that represents national harbourmasters associations, for example, the UK Harbour Masters’ Association (UKHMA).
