= Maritime security (USCG) =

Basic role of the United States Coast Guard

Maritime security is concerned with the prevention of intentional damage through sabotage, subversion, or terrorism. Maritime security is one of the three basic roles of the United States Coast Guard has gradually developed in response to a series of catastrophic events, and was greatly expanded after the September 11 attacks.

There are three main maritime security activities conducted by the Coast Guard:

- Port Security.
- Vessel Security.
- Facility Security.

== Legal Background ==
The principle laws that support this mission of the United States Coast Guard are:

- Espionage Act of 1917 - This act empowered the Coast Guard to make regulations to prevent damage to harbors and vessels during national security emergencies.
- Magnuson Act, 1950 - Enacted as a result of the "Red Scare," this act provided permanent port security regulations, and broad powers to search vessels in U.S. waters and control the movement of foreign vessels in U.S. ports.
- Ports and Waterways Safety Act, 1972 – Resulting from several major groundings and oil spills, this act provided port safety authority beyond the Magnuson Act to protect the use of port transportation facilities, and to enhance efforts against the degradation of the marine environment.
- Maritime Transportation Security Act of 2002 or MTSA – Enacted as a result of the September 11, 2001, terrorist attacks on the United States. This Act provided sweeping new authorities for preventing acts of terrorism within the U.S. maritime domain.
- The International Ship and Port Facility Security (ISPS) Code, 2002 – Adopted by the International Maritime Organization as new provisions to the International Convention for SOLAS to enhance maritime .

== Port Security ==
The Port Security requirements found in the MTSA requires security measures for U.S. ports in order to reduce the risks and to mitigate the results of an act that threatens the security of personnel, facilities, vessels, and the public. The regulations draw together assets within port boundaries to provide a framework to communicate, identify risks, and coordinate resources to mitigate threats and consequences. The COTP must ensure that the total port security posture is accurately assessed, and that security resources are appropriate to meet these programs. The COTP must identify critical assets within a port, develop a prioritized list of those most susceptible to acts of sabotage, and plan for adequate security measures to meet specific needs.

== Vessel Security ==
Both MTSA and the ISPS Code regulate vessel security. The regulations within these two documents require the owners or operators of vessels to designate security officers for vessels, develop security plans based on security assessments, implement security measures specific to the vessel’s operation, and comply with current Marine Security levels.

== Facility Security ==
A facility is defined as: any structure or facility of any kind located in, on, under, or adjacent to any waters subject to the jurisdiction of the U.S. and used, operated, or maintained by a public or private entity, including any contiguous or adjoining property under common ownership or operation. Some examples of facilities are:

- Barge fleeting facilities.
- Container terminals.
- Oil storage facilities.
- Passenger vessel terminals.

Outer Continental Shelf (OCS) Facilities are generally offshore fixed platforms in water depths ranging up to 1,000 feet deep whose primary purpose is the exploration, development, and/or product of offshore petroleum reserves. This definition also includes novel floating design such as:

- Tension Leg Platforms (TLP).
- Floating Production Facilities (converted MODUs).
- Floating Production Storage Offloading units (FPSO).

Both MTSA and the ISPS Code regulate facility security. The regulations within these two documents require the owners or operators of facilities to designate security officers for facilities, develop security plans based on security assessments, implement security measures specific to the facility’s operation, and comply with current Marine Security levels. Those facilities designated as Outer Continental Shelf (OCS) facilities must meet the same security requirements as those designated as waterfront facilities.

When US Navy merchant vessels are in dangerous waters, security detachments are posted on the vessel. Security forces have helped deter piracy as well as terrorist attacks, such as the Maersk Alabama and the USS Cole. US Navy merchant vessels normally train the deck department in firearms training, but the added Navy security detail provides for extra security. Additionally, Navy escorts might sometimes accompany the vessels, such as traveling through the Straights of Gibraltar.

== See also ==
- Maritime Safety and Security Team
- Port Safety mission covers accidental damage rather than intentional damage.
- Port Security Unit
