= Federal On Scene Coordinator =

The Federal On Scene Coordinator (Federal OSC), is a designation in the United States for an individual that:

- Is responsible for providing access to federal resources and technical assistance
- Coordinates all federal containment, removal, and disposal efforts and resources during an oil or hazmat incident
- Serves as the point of contact for coordination of federal efforts with the local response community
- Coordinates, monitors, or directs response efforts

The federal agency providing OSC might differ depending on the incident.

== General ==
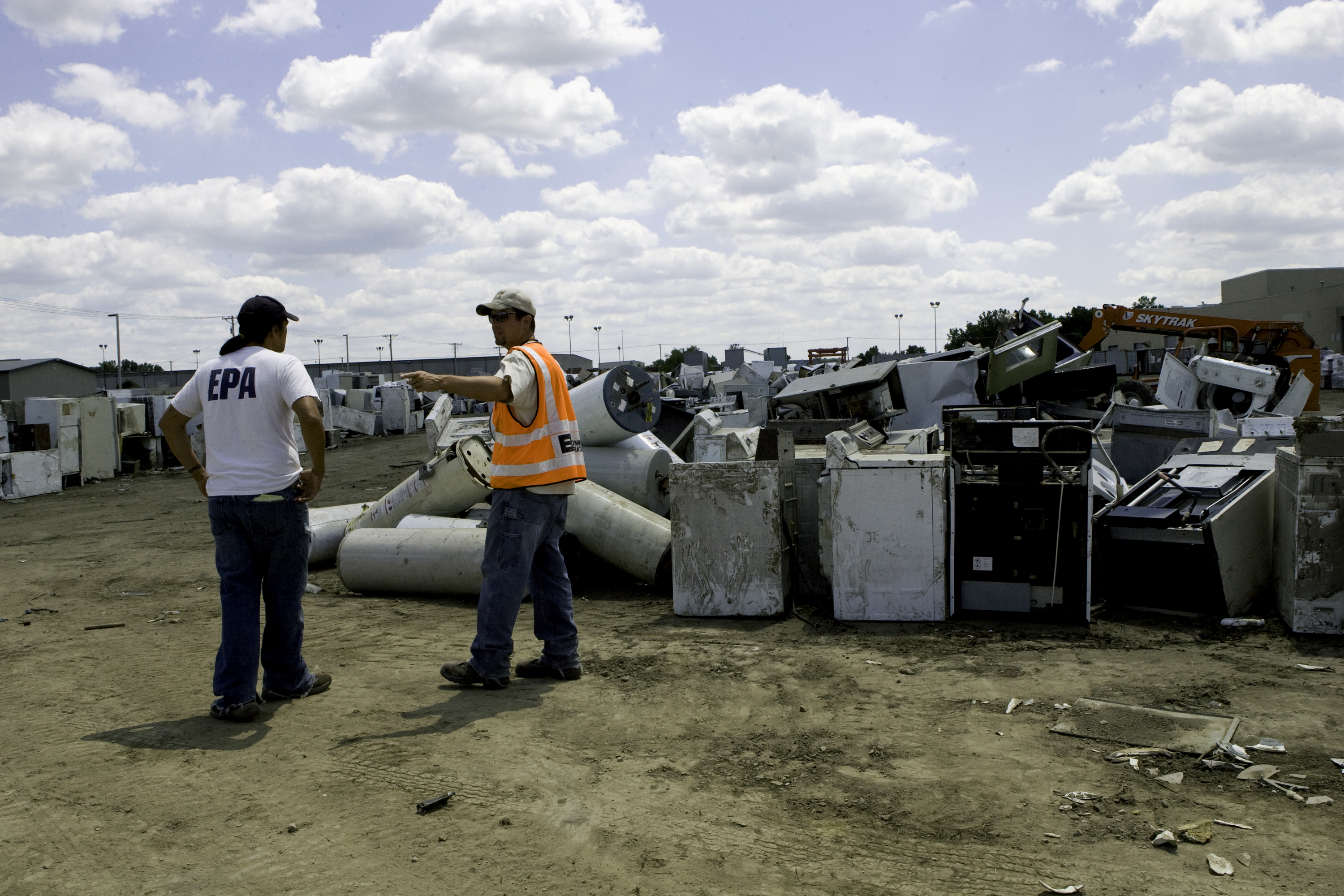
Cedar Rapids, Iowa, July 4, 2008-- EPA Federal On-Scene Coordinator John Frey, discussed an issue with a colleague in front of 'white goods' discarded household appliances; such as refrigerators, stoves, washers, dryers etc., which the EPA is responsible for recycling and disposing of

Federal OSCs are the federal officials predesignated by United States Environmental Protection Agency and the United States Coast Guard to coordinate response resources. The OSC, either directly or through their staff, monitors, provides technical assistance, and/or directs federal and potentially responsible party (PRP) resources. As the state and local responder's gateway to the resources of the NRS, it is the OSC's responsibility to provide access to resources and technical assistance that may not otherwise be available to a community. Under the NCP, if federal involvement is necessary because state and local resources have been exceeded, the OSC is obligated to coordinate the use of these resources to protect public health and the environment. (Note: An example of the OSC's direction of PRP resources could be through participation in the Unified Command under the Incident Command System or issuance of an administrative order.)

During an oil or hazmat incident, EPA will usually provide OSCs in the inland zone, and the USCG will generally provide OSCs in the coastal zone. The OSC coordinates all federal containment, removal, and disposal efforts and resources during an incident under the NCP or the Federal Response Plan (FRP). The OSC is the point of contact for the coordination of federal efforts with those of the local response community. EPA has approximately 200 OSCs at 17 locations nationwide; USCG has 46 Marine Safety Offices (MSOs), spread among the nine USCG Districts, each of which is headed by a Captain of the Port (COTP), who acts as an OSC.

Agencies other than EPA or USCG might provide the OSC depending on the incident. While EPA and USCG have primary responsibility under federal laws and regulations, under CERCLA, DOD, DOE, and other federal agencies provide OSCs for incidents for which they have responsibility for releases of hazardous substances. If a federal agency other than EPA, USCG, DOD, or DOE – has responsibility for an incident, they only provide the OSC if the incident involves non-emergency removal actions. Each of the agencies in the NRS provides resources and technical expertise and has access to a wide range of federal assets, such as equipment and special expertise, through the RRT.

== Planning roles and responsibilities ==
Under the NCP, OSCs have the responsibility to oversee development of the Area Contingency Plan (ACP) in the area of the OSC's responsibility. The NCP states that the development of ACPs should be accomplished in cooperation with the RRT, and designated local and state representatives, as appropriate. In both contingency planning and spill response, the OSC is responsible for coordinating, directing, and reviewing the work of other agencies, Area Committees, RPs, and contractors to ensure compliance with the NCP and other plans applicable to the response.

In developing the ACP, the OSC must coordinate with state and local response organizations, including those represented on the State Emergency Response Commissions (SERCs) and Local Emergency Planning Committees (LEPCs). It is the OSC's and Area Committee's responsibility to ensure that the ACP provides for a well coordinated response that is integrated and compatible, to the greatest extent possible, with all appropriate response plans of local, state, and non-federal entities, and especially with SARA Title III local emergency response plans. The OSC should also include, to the extent possible, a discussion of relationships with potential RPs. In addition, the OSC must periodically conduct drills of spill removal capability, including fish and wildlife response capability, without prior notice, in areas for which ACPs are required and under relevant tank vessel and facility response plans. In the event of a significant discharge, OSCs should implement the ICS specified in the ACP.

== Response roles and responsibilities ==
The use of the ICS/UC as a management tool does not relieve the On-Scene Coordinator (OSC) of her or his obligation to direct, monitor, and coordinate response actions. The OSC in every case retains the authority to direct the response, and must direct responses to discharges of oil that pose a substantial threat to the public health or welfare of the United States. In most situations, however, the OSC will choose to monitor the actions of the RP and/or local and state governments and provide support and advice where appropriate. It is the OSC's responsibility to explain the OSC's authority at a response during both the planning and response phases. The ICS/UC also is a useful mechanism in obtaining input from other responders to help the OSC in directing and coordinating response efforts.

The OSC should either implement an ICS at the beginning of a response, or be prepared to integrate into an existing, properly functioning, ICS during a response. It is important to recognize that local and/or state responders may already have established an ICS when the OSC arrives on-scene. In many cases, the OSC will fill multiple positions within the ICS organization. An OSC also may elect to establish any of the functions of an ICS by assigning responsibility to another individual.

== See also ==
- Search and Rescue
- Sector Commander
