= National Vessel Movement Center =

Subdivision of the United States Coast Guard

The National Vessel Movement Center, commonly abbreviated NVMC, is a military subdivision of the United States Coast Guard, assigned to record and monitor arrivals of ships within United States ports. Its purpose is to prevent terrorist attack.

The NVMC commenced operations on October 15, 2001, relieving the United States Department of Transportation of this responsibility.

361 U.S. ports are on watch, with 55 (15%) indicated as militarily or economically critical.

All ship classifications are monitored. Information recorded includes:

- Estimated time of arrival (ETA)
- Name and home port of ship
- Hazards, if any
- Cargo and passengers on board
- Reason(s) for entering ports

The system is based on both a Notification System (SANS) and an NVMC database.

== See also ==
- United States Department of Transportation
- United States Department of Homeland Security
