= Sector commander =

Position in the United States Coast Guard

Sector Commander is the position title of the commanding officer of a United States Coast Guard Sector, usually of the rank of Captain (O-6). The Sector Commander's second-in-command is the Deputy Sector Commander. Also reporting directly to the Sector Commander are the Command Master Chief (CMC), the Senior Reserve Officer, and the Sector's Auxiliary Coordinator.

Unless otherwise assigned, the Sector Commander serves as the Captain of the Port (COTP), Federal Maritime Security Coordinator (FMSC), Officer in Charge, Marine Inspection (OCMI), Search and Rescue Mission Coordinator (SMC), and maritime Federal On Scene Coordinator (FOSC).

In the event of an emergency, the Sector Commander has broad authority to act as necessary without additional authorization and acts as coordinator among other major Federal agencies in the maritime area of responsibility. However, the Sector Commander must consider federal laws and the Code of Federal Regulations in making decisions in non-emergencies.

== Captain of the Port ==
Per 33 CFR 1.01-30, Captains of the Port and their representatives enforce within their respective areas port safety and security and marine environmental protection regulations, including, without limitation, regulations for the protection and security of vessels, harbors, and waterfront facilities; anchorages; security zones; safety zones; regulated navigation areas; deepwater ports; water pollution; and ports and waterways safety.

The designation was first used during World War I and was given to the officer responsible for loading munitions aboard ships.

For other uses of the term outside the U.S. Coast Guard, see Captain of the Port.

=== History ===
==== World War I ====
During World War I, the Coast Guard served under the Navy and enforced rules and regulations that governed the anchorage and movements of vessels in American harbors. The Espionage Act, passed in June 1917, gave the Coast Guard increased power to protect merchant shipping from sabotage. This Act vested the Coast Guard with a wide range of responsibilities, including the safeguarding of waterfront property, supervision of vessel movements, establishment of anchorages and restricted areas, and the right to control and remove people aboard ships. In order to be successful in all of these missions, the Coast Guard worked directly with local shipping companies and pilots' associations to ensure that American ports remained safe and secure, but also afforded appropriate avenues for commerce.

The tremendous increase in munitions shipments during World War I, particularly in New York, required an increase in personnel to oversee this activity. The term "Captain of the Port (COTP)" was first used in New York. This officer was charged with supervising the safe loading of explosives. During the war similar posts were established in other U.S. ports.

==== World War II ====
After World War I, the COTP officers were retained to regulate peacetime port activities, and the position continued to be known as the COTP. In the 20 years following the war, the Coast Guard's responsibilities concerning anchorage regulations and vessel movements in American harbors grew. In April 1939, with the outbreak of World War II imminent, the Coast Guard once again was called to enforce new marine safety regulations in the form of anchorage regulations.

During World War II, the port-security mission grew through various laws and agreements to give the service broad wartime responsibilities. In June 1940, President Franklin Roosevelt proclaimed that the Coast Guard would assume the functions that other government agencies had previously overseen because the increased traffic in American ports had blurred the authority of the various federal, state, and local agencies responsible for port security and safety. The Coast Guard developed these new waterways management regulations and enforcement strategies through developing working partnerships with local pilots' associations and the shipping industry.

The Dangerous Cargo Act of October 1940 and the restructuring of anchorage regulations during that same month clearly laid out and expanded previous regulations and provisions. The responsibilities of each COTP increased and in November 1940, 29 ports were designated to have Coast Guard Captain of the Port offices. This created a regime for enforcing the laws and regulations which governed the movement of vessels, the loading of dangerous cargoes, and the protection and regulation of anchorages. This also provided a central Coast Guard office for the local shipping industry to interface with the Coast Guard to address local concerns.

==== Protection of Waterfronts ====
Early in 1942, those responsible for port safety realized that the peacetime regulations that governed the movement of explosives would have to be amended to sufficiently handle wartime conditions. One of the more visible duties of the Coast Guard was the protection of piers and docks. The service began this job with the understanding that it could not be solely a Coast Guard operation. To perform this tremendous task, COTPs had to coordinate operations, and their personnel supplemented municipal and private personnel. The protection of waterfront property and facilities was accomplished using military, naval, and Department of Justice intelligence personnel; private organizations and companies; municipal and state police forces; and commercial organizations such as underwriter associations.

To protect vessels and important installations within each port facility, the Coast Guard created security zones around the dock areas. Within these areas the COTPs assigned roving guards and enforced the integrity of the zones with Coast Guard personnel and barricaded streets. The men watching the waterfront generally performed their service on foot but used vehicles in isolated spots.

While pier and facility guards were important, harbor patrols were just as significant as those from shore and consumed much of the manpower of the COTP offices. This particular task used various patrol craft to watch the multitude of vessels and harbors full of vessels. These small harbor craft worked in tandem with offshore patrols and the Coast Guard Beach Patrol to watch the vast shore lines.

Balancing both harbor safety and port security, harbor-patrol craft watched for fires, detected unauthorized persons and pleasure craft with improper papers, reported accidents, removed menaces to navigation, rendered assistance, patrolled anchorages and restricted areas, and escorted ammunition and dangerous cargo ships out of the harbor. Most of this duty consisted of identifying and checking personnel aboard vessels. Coast Guard harbor patrols often questioned the occupants of small craft and checked cargoes for proper documentation. Parties of Coast Guard Personnel also inspected ships' equipment for safety and made recommendations for replacing firefighting equipment or called fire hazards to the attention of owners.

By the end of the war, nearly 200 COTP and assistant COTP offices had been established in the United States and overseas. The COTPs' valuable service to ensure the steady movement of supplies was of inestimable value, and was built upon the ability to address both safety and security requirements in the complex port environment.

==== Port State Control ====
After World War II, the Coast Guard continued to grow and improve its multi-mission capability, while striving to balance the safety and security of American ports. The U.S. Coast Guard became a model marine safety agency for the world, playing a major role in the development of international standards that improve the safety and security of the world's maritime transportation system.

In the 1970s, the Coast Guard, as the lead U.S. agency at the International Maritime Organization (IMO), began an effort that led to significant improvements to the international safety and environmental protection standards for shipping. In addition, the Coast Guard also took action to improve international compliance with IMO standards since not all Flag States were fulfilling their responsibility to ensure their ships met the international standards. IMO standards had improved, enforcement had not.

By the late 1980s, the number of substandard ships entering U.S. ports posed increased threats to maritime commerce and environment. In response, the Coast Guard began a concerted port state control effort in 1994 to ensure ships calling in U.S. ports met international standards for safety and operations. Largely due to the success of what came to be known as the Coast Guard's Port State Control (PSC) program, the IMO adopted new standards to expand the authority of port states when conducting safety inspections onboard foreign vessels.

These inspections were originally intended to supplement Flag State exam programs, but experience taught that port state inspections were essential to ensuring the safety of vessels engaged in worldwide commerce, especially if these exams were organized on a regional basis. Since ships move cargo from port to port and country to country, it was found to be to every nation's advantage if inspections could be closely coordinated. To facilitate information exchange, the Coast Guard developed the Maritime Information Exchange and Port State Information Exchange systems to share vital safety information with fellow port states and shipping companies. The results of safety inspections and ship specific information are still recorded and made public in these systems. This transparency of information helps to ensure that as many ships as possible are inspected while at the same time prevents ships from being delayed by unnecessary, redundant inspections. These information systems were developed jointly with the maritime industry to facilitate safe commerce.

The Coast Guard developed a boarding priority matrix in the 1990s. This matrix is still used today to prioritize ships for port state control inspections based on their relative risk. The matrix was constructed around the past performance of each ship's Flag State, classification society, operating company, ship type, and the ship's prior compliance history. Whenever a substandard ship is detained, the Coast Guard reports the action via an internet based system to alert shippers to potential risks associated with shipping on the substandard vessel. To ensure global alignment against substandard vessels, detailed information on detentions is also reported to an international database shared by PSC regimes around the world.

==== Post September 11, 2001 ====
After the terrorist attacks of September 11, 2001, the PSC program was immediately expanded to address emerging security concerns for United States ports. The pre-arrival boarding matrix integrated both safety and security background checks. High risk vessels were boarded at-sea and pre-arrival notice requirements were expanded to ensure the Coast Guard could complete adequate safety and security screening prior to a vessel's arrival. The validation of mariners' documents became an integrated security check conducted jointly with U.S. Customs and Border Protection agents. The PSC exam was quickly expanded to validate vessels for compliance with the requirements of both the Maritime Transportation Security Act of 2002 (MTSA) and the International Ship and Port Facility Security Code (ISPS), which was negotiated through the IMO and serves as the international counterpart to the MTSA.

Implementation of the MTSA and ISPS Code was achieved by working closely with the Coast Guard's industry and agency partners.

== Officer in Charge, Marine Inspection ==
Per 33 CFR 1.01-20, final authority is vested in the Officer in Charge, Marine Inspection, for the performance, within the area of his jurisdiction, of the following functions:

- Inspection of vessels in order to determine that they comply with the applicable laws, rules, and regulations relating to safe construction, equipment, manning, and operation and that they are in a seaworthy condition for the services in which they are operated;
- Shipyard and port facility safety inspections;
- Investigation of marine casualties and accidents;
- Credentialing, shipment and discharge of U.S. merchant mariners;
- Investigation and initiating of action in cases of misconduct, negligence, or incompetence of merchant marine officers or seamen; and
- Enforcement of vessel inspection, navigation, and seamen's laws in general.

== Federal On-Scene Coordinator ==
Per 33 CFR 153.103(n), the Federal On-Scene Coordinator or FOSC is the official predesignated by the Environmental Protection Agency (EPA) or Coast Guard to coordinate and direct Federal removal efforts at the scene of an oil or hazardous substance discharge as prescribed in the National Oil and Hazardous Substances Pollution Contingency Plan (National Contingency Plan) as published in 40 CFR Part 300.

== Federal Maritime Security Coordinator ==
As stipulated in the Maritime Transportation Security Act of 2002, the Secretary designates a Coast Guard official to serve as the FMSC in each area to develop an area maritime security plan and coordinate actions under the National Transportation Security Plan.

33 CFR 103.205 gives the Sector Commander, as the Federal Maritime Security Coordinator, the authority to establish, convene, and direct the Area Maritime Security (AMS) Committee which is a group of port stakeholders focused on security. The FMSC will develop and maintain the AMS Plan in coordination with the AMS Committee, and is responsible for implementing and exercising the plan.

== Search and Rescue Mission Coordinator ==
Each Search and Rescue (SAR) operation is carried out under the guidance of a Search and Rescue Mission Coordinator (SMC). The SMC is usually the District Commander through the District's Rescue Coordination Center (RCC) for offshore SAR, or the Sector Commander, through the Sector Command Center for coastal SAR. The SMC has several duties and responsibilities:

- Obtain and evaluate all data on the emergency.
- Dispatch search and rescue units (SRUs) based on this information.
- Develop search plans which include determining limits for the search area, selecting the search pattern, and designating the on-scene coordinator (OSC).
- Control the SAR communication network for the assigned mission.
- Monitor progress of the SAR mission and request additional SAR resources as necessary.
