= List of United States Coast Guard stations =

Coast Guard Station Tom's River, pictured as a life saving station. It was operational from 1872 to around 1964.

This article contains a list of United States Coast Guard stations in the United States within the United States Coast Guard's nine districts. There are currently many stations located throughout the country along the shores of the Atlantic Ocean, Gulf of Mexico, Pacific Ocean and Great Lakes. Although many of the stations have been located on shore, floating stations have been based on the Ohio River and Dorchester Bay.

Many of the stations listed date from the 1800s, during the existence of the United States Life-Saving Service. Development of stations were started with the 1848 signing of the Newell Act. This act allowed Congress to appropriate $10,000 to established unmanned life-saving stations along the New Jersey coast south of New York Harbor and to provide "surf boat, rockets, carronades and other necessary apparatus for the better preservation of life and property from shipwreck ... ." During that same year, the Massachusetts Humane Society received funds from Congress for life-saving stations on the Massachusetts coastline. Over the next six years, further stations were built, although they were loosely managed.

The advent of air stations beginning in 1920 meant that some stations would become obsolete, as air coverage and improved technology were better able to supplement the rescue of mariners in remote regions. With early air stations using aircraft that could land on water, boat and air stations could work together to make sure that maximum help could be provided in time of need.

== Northeast District ==
=== Maine ===
Active US Coast Guard installations located within Maine.

USCG Air Station

USCG Station

USCG Detachment

USCG Auxiliary

Station	Location	Opened	Closed	Life-Saving Station?	Life-Saving Station number	Life-Saving Station district	Coast Guard Station number	Reference
Coast Guard Station Boothbay Harbor	Boothbay Harbor	1967	Active	No	N/A	N/A	Unknown	
Coast Guard Station Burnt Island	Burnt Island	1891	1964	Yes	Unknown	1st	7	
Coast Guard Station Cape Elizabeth	Cape Elizabeth	1887	1964	Yes	Unknown	1st	10	
Coast Guard Station Cranberry Island	Cranberry Isles	1879–1880	1946	Yes	4	1st	5	
Coast Guard Station Cross Island	Cross Island	1874	1964	Yes	2	1st	2	
Coast Guard Station Crumple Island	Crumple Island	1874	1952	Yes	3	1st	4	
Coast Guard Station Damariscove Island	Damariscove Island	1897	1960	Yes	Unknown	1st	8	
Coast Guard Station Fletcher's Neck	Biddeford	1873	1955	Yes	6	1st	11	
Coast Guard Station Hunniwell's Beach (Kennebec River)	Phippsburg	1883	1971	Yes	Unknown	1st	9	
Marine Safety Detachment Belfast	Belfast	Unknown	Active	Yes	Unknown	1st	Unknown	
Coast Guard Station Jonesport	Jonesport	Unknown	Active	No	N/A	1st	Unknown	
Coast Guard Station Quoddy Head	Lubec	1873	1970	Yes	1	1st	1	
Coast Guard Station Rockland	Rockland	1946	Active	No	N/A	N/A	Unknown	
Coast Guard Station South Portland	South Portland	Pre-1941	Active	Unknown	Unknown	N/A	Unknown	
Coast Guard Station Southwest Harbor	Southwest Harbor	1937	Active	No	N/A	N/A	Unknown	
Coast Guard Station Eastport	Eastport	Unknown	Active	N/A	Unknown	Unknown	Unknown	
Coast Guard Station White Head	St. George	1874	1956	Yes	5	1st	6	
Saco Bay Yacht Club	Saco	Unknown	Active	N/A	N/A	N/A	Unknown	
Bangor Police Department Building	Bangor	Unknown	Active	N/A	N/A	N/A	Unknown	

=== New Hampshire ===
Active US Coast Guard installations located within New Hampshire.

USCG Air Station

USCG Station

USCG Detachment

USCG Auxiliary

Station	Location	Opened	Closed	Life-Saving Station?	Life-Saving Station number	Life-Saving Station district	Coast Guard Station number	Reference
Coast Guard Station Hampton Beach	Hampton Beach	1898	1969	Yes	Unknown	1st	16	
Coast Guard Station Isle of Shoals	Appledore Island	1910	1954	No	N/A	N/A	14	
Coast Guard Station Portsmouth Harbor	New Castle	unknown	active	Yes	Unknown	1st	Unknown	
Coast Guard Station Rye Beach	Rye	1874	1933	Yes	7	1st	15	
Coast Guard Station Wallis Sands	Rye	1890	1938	Yes	Unknown	1st	13	

=== Vermont ===
Active US Coast Guard installations located within Vermont.

USCG Air Station

USCG Station

USCG Detachment

USCG Auxiliary

Station	Location	Opened	Closed	Life-Saving Station?	Life-Saving Station number	Life-Saving Station district	Coast Guard Station number	Reference
Coast Guard Station Burlington	Burlington	1948	Active	No	N/A	N/A	Unknown	

=== Massachusetts ===
Active US Coast Guard installations located within Massachusetts.

USCG Air Station

USCG Station

USCG Detachment

USCG Auxiliary

Station	Location	Opened	Closed	Life-Saving Station?	Life-Saving Station number	Life-Saving Station district	Coast Guard Station number	Reference
Coast Guard Station Boston	Boston	1790; 2003	1996; Active	No	N/A	N/A	Unknown	
Coast Guard Station Brant Point	Nantucket	Unknown	Active	Unknown	N/A	N/A	Unknown	
Coast Guard Station Brant Rock	Marshfield	1892–1893	1953	Yes	Unknown	2nd	29	
Coast Guard Station Cahoons Hollow	Wellfleet	1872–1873	1950	Yes	10	2nd	38	
Joint Base Cape Cod	Bourne	Unknown	Active	No	N/A	N/A	Unknown	
Coast Guard Station Chatham	Chatham	1872	Active	Yes	13	2nd	42	
Coast Guard Station City Point	Dorchester Bay (floating station)	1896	1929	Yes	Unknown	2nd	25	
Coast Guard Station Coskata	Nantucket	1883	1953	Yes	Unknown	2nd	45	
Coast Guard Station Cuttyhunk	Cuttyhunk	1895	1964?	Yes	Unknown	2nd	50	
Coast Guard Station Fourth Cliff	Scituate	1879	1952	Yes	3	2nd	28	
Coast Guard Station Gloucester	Gloucester	1900	Active	Yes	Unknown	2nd	23	
Coast Guard Station Gurnet	Duxbury	1878	1957	Yes	4	2nd	30	
Coast Guard Station High Head	Truro	1882	1921	Yes	Unknown	2nd	35	
Coast Guard Station Highland	Truro	1872	1955	Yes	8	2nd	36	
Coast Guard Station Maddaket	Nantucket	1889	1956	Yes	Unknown	2nd	47	
Coast Guard Station Manomet Point	Manomet	1874	1955	Yes	5	2nd	31	
Coast Guard Station Menemsha	Aquinnah	1895	Active	Yes	Unknown	2nd	49	
Coast Guard Station Merrimack River	Newburyport	1882	Active	Yes	1	2nd	20	
Coast Guard Station Monomoy	Monomoy Island	1873–1874	1955	Yes	14	2nd	43	
Coast Guard Station Monomoy Point	Monomoy Island	1902	1947	Yes	Unknown	2nd	44	
Coast Guard Station Muskeget	Muskeget Island	1882	1922	Yes	Unknown	2nd	48	
Coast Guard Station Nahant	Nahant	1898	1963	Yes	Unknown	2nd	24	
Coast Guard Station Nauset	Eastham	1872	1948	Yes	11	2nd	39	
Coast Guard Station New Bedford	New Bedford	Unknown	2003	No	N/A	N/A	Unknown	
Coast Guard Station Osterville	Osterville	Unknown	1986	No	N/A	N/A	Unknown	
Coast Guard Station North Scituate	North Scituate	1884	1947	Yes	Unknown	2nd	27	
Coast Guard Station Old Harbor	Chatham	1897–1898	1947	Yes	Unknown	2nd	41	
Coast Guard Station Orleans	Orleans	1872–1873	1947	Yes	12	2nd	40	
Coast Guard Station Pamet River	Truro	1873	1938	Yes	9	2nd	37	
Coast Guard Station Peaked Hill Bars	Provincetown	1872	1938	Yes	7	2nd	34	
Coast Guard Station Plum Island	Plum Island	1889	Unknown	Yes	1	2nd	21	
Coast Guard Station Point Allerton	Hull	1889	Active	Yes	Unknown	2nd	26	
Coast Guard Station Provincetown	Provincetown	1979	Active	No	N/A	N/A	Unknown	
Coast Guard Station Race Point	Provincetown	1872	Active	Yes	6	2nd	33	
Coast Guard Station Salisbury Beach	Salisbury	1897–1898	1939	Yes	Unknown	2nd	19	
Coast Guard Station Scituate (seasonal)	Scituate	1936	Active	No	N/A	N/A	Unknown	
Coast Guard Station Straitsmouth	Annisquam	1889	1964	Yes	2	2nd	22	
Coast Guard Station Surfside	Nantucket	1874	1921	Yes	15	2nd	46	
Coast Guard Station Wood End	Provincetown	1896	1948	Yes	Unknown	2nd	32	
Coast Guard Station Woods Hole	Woods Hole	Unknown	Active	Unknown	Unknown	Unknown	Unknown	

=== Rhode Island ===
Active US Coast Guard installations located within Rhode Island.

USCG Air Station

USCG Station

USCG Detachment

USCG Auxiliary

Station	Location	Opened	Closed	Life-Saving Station?	Life-Saving Station number	Life-Saving Station district	Coast Guard Station number	Reference
Coast Guard Station Block Island	New Shoreham	1879	Active	Yes	5	3rd	62	
Coast Guard Station Brenton Point	Newport	1884	1946	No	N/A	N/A	53	
Coast Guard Auxiliary Station Warwick	Warwick	1972	Active	Yes	Unknown	Unknown	Unknown	
Coast Guard Station Castle Hill	Newport	1941	Active	Active	34			
Coast Guard Station Green Hill	South Kingstown	1911–1912	1939	Yes	Unknown	3rd	Unknown	
Coast Guard Station Narragansett	Narragansett	1887	1937	Yes	1	3rd	54	
Coast Guard Station New Shoreham	New Shoreham	1874	1937	Yes	4	3rd	61	
Coast Guard Station Point Judith	Point Judith	1876	Active	Yes	2	3rd	55	
Coast Guard Station Quonocontaug	Quonochontaug	1891	1939	Yes	Unknown	3rd	57	
Coast Guard Station Sandy Point	Portsmouth	1898	1922	Yes	Unknown	3rd	60	
Coast Guard Station Watch Hill	Watch Hill	1879	1947?	Yes	3	3rd	58	

=== Connecticut ===
Station	Location	Opened	Closed	Life-Saving Station?	Life-Saving Station number	Life-Saving Station district	Coast Guard Station number	Reference
Coast Guard Station New Haven	New Haven	Unknown	Active	Unknown	Unknown	N/A	Unknown	
Coast Guard Station New London	New London	Unknown	Active	Unknown	Unknown	N/A	Unknown	

=== New York ===
Station	Location	Opened	Closed	Life-Saving Station?	Life-Saving Station number	Life-Saving Station district	Coast Guard Station number	Reference
Coast Guard Station Amagansett	Amagansett	1877	1937	Yes	10	3rd	68	
Coast Guard Station Bellport	Bellport	1879	1951	Yes	21	3rd	79	
Coast Guard Station Blue Point	Patchogue	1856	1946	Yes	22	3rd	80	
Coast Guard Station City Island	City Island	Unknown	Unknown	Unknown	Unknown	Unknown	Unknown	
Coast Guard Station Coney Island	Coney Island	1856	1899	Yes	37	3rd	1899	
Coast Guard Station Ditch Plain	Montauk	1854	1956	Yes	7	3rd	65	
Coast Guard Station Eatons Neck	Eatons Neck	1849	Active	Yes	38	3rd	94	
Coast Guard Station Far Rockaway	Far Rockaway	1871	1892	Yes	34	3rd	N/A	
Coast Guard Station Fire Island	Fire Island	1849	Active	Yes	25	3rd	83	
Coast Guard Station Fishers Island	Fishers Island	Post-1901	1940–1945	Yes	Unknown	3rd	59	
Coast Guard Station Forge River	Ocean Bay Park	1871	1948	Yes	19	3rd	77	
Coast Guard Station Fort Totten	Fort Totten	1976	2002?	No	N/A	N/A	Unknown	
Coast Guard Station Georgica	East Hampton	1872	1948	Yes	11	3rd	69	
Coast Guard Station Gilgo	Gilgo	1853	1917	Yes	27	3rd	85	
Coast Guard Station Hither Plain	Montauk	1871	1948	Yes	8	3rd	66	
Coast Guard Station Jones Beach (1st)	Jones Beach Island	1871	1949?	Yes	28	3rd	86	
Coast Guard Station Jones Beach (2nd)	Jones Beach Island	1878	Active	Yes	30	3rd	88	
Coast Guard Station Kings Point	Kings Point	2002	Active	No	N/A	N/A	Unknown	
Coast Guard Station Lone Hill	Fire Island	1855	1946	Yes	23	3rd	81	
Coast Guard Station Long Beach	Long Beach	1849	1939	Yes	3	3rd	90	
Coast Guard Station Meadow Island	Meadow Island	1872	1882	Yes	Unknown	Unknown	Unknown	
Coast Guard Station Mecox	Bridgehampton	1849	1850	Yes	12	3rd	70	
Coast Guard Station Montauk	Montauk	1954	Active	No	N/A	N/A	Unknown	
Coast Guard Station Montauk Point	Montauk	Pre-1882	c. 1900	Yes	6	3rd	N/A	
Coast Guard Station Moriches	Moriches	1849	1954	Yes	18	3rd	76	
Coast Guard Station Napeague	Napeague	1855	1949	Yes	9	3rd	67	
Coast Guard Station New York	New York	Unknown	Active	Unknown	Unknown	Unknown	Unknown	
Coast Guard Station Oak Island	Oak Beach	1861	1937	Yes	26	3rd	84	
Coast Guard Station Point Lookout	Fire Island	1872	1948	Yes	32	3rd	89	
Coast Guard Station Point of Woods	Point O' Woods	1856	1937	Yes	24	3rd	82	
Coast Guard Station Potunk	Westhampton	1872	1937	Yes	17	3rd	75	
Coast Guard Station Quogue	Quogue	1849	1937	Yes	Unknown	3rd	74	
Coast Guard Station Rockaway (1st)	Rockaway	1872	Pre-1960	Yes	35	3rd	91	
Coast Guard Station Rockaway Point	Rockaway	1856	2003	Yes	36	3rd	92	
Coast Guard Station Rocky Point	Rocky Point	1896	1946	Yes	3rd	Unknown	95	
Coast Guard Station Sheep's Head Bay	Brooklyn	1876	1878	Yes	Unknown	Unknown	N/A	
Coast Guard Station Shinnecock	Southampton	1855	Active	Yes	13	3rd	72	
Coast Guard Station Smiths Point	Fire Island	1872	1937	Yes	20	3rd	78	
Coast Guard Station Southampton	Southampton	1849	1946	Yes	13	3rd	71	
Coast Guard Station Tiana	Hampton Bays	1871	1946	Yes	15	3rd	73	
Coast Guard Station Zachs Inlet	Jones Beach Island	1869	1934	Yes	Unknown	Unknown	87	

=== New Jersey ===
Station	Location	Opened	Closed	Life-Saving Station?	Life-Saving Station number	Life-Saving Station district	Coast Guard Station number	Reference
Coast Guard Station Sandy Hook	Sandy Hook	1848	Active	Yes	1	4th	97	
Coast Guard Station Spermaceti Cove	Middletown	1849	1949	Yes	2	4th	98	

== East District ==
=== New Jersey ===
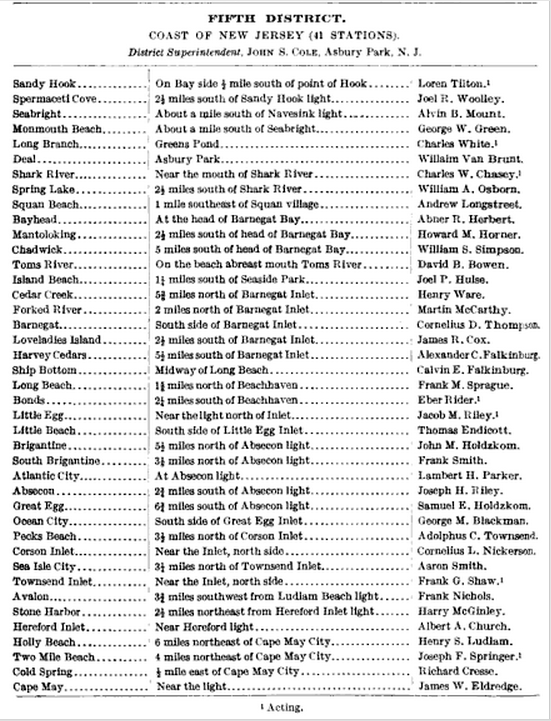
1915 list of New Jersey stations

Station	Location	Opened	Closed	Life-Saving Station?	Life-Saving Station number	Life-Saving Station district	Coast Guard Station number	Reference
Coast Guard Station Absecon	Absecon	1872	1955	Yes	28	4th	124	
Coast Guard Station Atlantic City	Atlantic City	1853	Active	Yes	27	4th	123	
Coast Guard Station Avalon	Avalon	1894	1948	Yes	Unknown	4th	131	
Coast Guard Station Barnegat	Barnegat	1855	Active	Yes	17	4th	113	
Coast Guard Station Bay Head	Bay Head	1856?	1946	Yes	10	4th	106	
Coast Guard Station Beach Haven	Beach Haven	Unknown	Active	Unknown	Unknown	Unknown	Unknown	
Coast Guard Station Bonds	Beach Haven	1849	Unknown	Yes	22	4th	118	
Coast Guard Station Brigantine	Brigantine	1898	1949	Yes	25	4th	121	
Coast Guard Station Cape May	Cape May	1849	Active	Yes	29	4th	137	
Coast Guard Station Cedar Creek	Island Beach	1872	1939	Yes	Unknown	4th	111	
Coast Guard Station Chadwick's	Chadwick Beach Island	1849	1939	Yes	Unknown	4th	108	
Coast Guard Station Cold Spring	Cold Spring	1868	1952	Yes	Unknown	4th	136	
Coast Guard Station Corson Inlet	Corson Inlet	1849	1962	Yes	32	4th	128	
Coast Guard Station Deal	Deal	1849	1946	Yes	6	4th	102	
Coast Guard Station Forked River	Forked River	1855	1948	Yes	15	4th	112	
Coast Guard Station Fortesque	Fortescue	Unknown	Active	Unknown	Unknown	Unknown	Unknown	
Coast Guard Base Gloucester	Gloucester City	1898?	1988	Yes	Unknown	4th	Unknown	
Coast Guard Station Harvey Cedar	Harvey Cedars	1849	1950	Yes	19	4th	115	
Coast Guard Station Hereford Inlet	North Wildwood	1881	1964	Yes	Unknown	4th	133	
Coast Guard Station Island Beach	Island Beach	1849	1946	Yes	14	4th	110	
Coast Guard Station Little Beach	Little Beach	1872	1945	Yes	24	4th	120	
Coast Guard Station Little Egg	Little Egg Harbor Township	1856?	Pre-1964	Yes	23	4th	119	
Coast Guard Station Long Beach	Long Beach	1849	1946	Yes	21	4th	117	
Coast Guard Station Long Branch	Long Branch	1854	1938	Yes	5	4th	101	
Coast Guard Station Loveladies Island	Loveladies	1871	1922	Yes	18	4th	114	
Coast Guard Station Manasquan	Manasquan	1856	Active	Yes	9	4th	105	
Coast Guard Station Mantoloking	Mantoloking	1872	1938	Yes	11	4th	107	
Coast Guard Station Monmouth Beach	Monmouth Beach	1857	Pre-1964	Yes	4	4th	100	
Coast Guard Station Ocean City	Ocean City	1878	Active	Yes	30	4th	126	
Coast Guard Station Peck's Beach	Ocean City	1870	1922	Yes	31	4th	127	
Coast Guard Station Sea Isle City	Sea Isle City	1872	1939	Yes	33	4th	129	
Coast Guard Station Seabright	Seabright	1871	1938	Yes	3	4th	99	
Coast Guard Station Shark River	Avon-by-the-Sea	1871	2021	Yes	7	4th	103	
Coast Guard Station Ship Bottom	Ship Bottom	1872	Unknown	Yes	20	4th	116	
Coast Guard Station South Brigantine	Brigantine	1872	Pre-1955	Yes	Unknown	4th	122	
Coast Guard Station Spring Lake	Spring Lake	Unknown	1947	Yes	8	4th	104	
Coast Guard Station Tatham's	Stone Harbor	1872	1948	Yes	35	4th	132	
Coast Guard Station Tom's River	Tom's River	1872	Pre-1964	Yes	13	4th	109	
Coast Guard Station Townsend Inlet	Avalon	1849	Active	Yes	34	4th	130	
Coast Guard Station Turtle Gut	Wildwood Crest	Unknown	1925?	Yes	37	4th	Unknown	
Coast Guard Station Wildwood	Wildwood	1849	Unknown	Yes	Unknown	4th	134	

=== Pennsylvania ===
Station	Location	Opened	Closed	Life-Saving Station?	Life-Saving Station number	Life-Saving Station district	Coast Guard Station number	Reference
Coast Guard Station Philadelphia	Philadelphia	June 7, 2002	Active	Yes	Unknown	Unknown	Unknown	

=== Delaware ===
Station	Location	Opened	Closed	Life-Saving Station?	Life-Saving Station number	Life-Saving Station district	Coast Guard Station number	Reference
Coast Guard Station Bethany Beach	Bethany Beach	1905	1945	Yes	2	5th	143	
Coast Guard Station Cape Henlopen	Cape Henlopen	1876	1937	Yes	1	5th	140	
Coast Guard Station Fenwick Island	Fenwick Island	1891	Pre-1957	Yes	Unknown	5th	144	
Coast Guard Station Indian River Inlet	Rehoboth Beach	1876; 1964	1962; Active	Yes	3	5th	142	
Coast Guard Station Lewes	Lewes	1883	Pre-1957	Yes	Unknown	5th	139	
Coast Guard Station Rehoboth Beach	Rehoboth Beach	1878	1921	Yes	2	5th	141	

=== Maryland ===
Station	Location	Opened	Closed	Life-Saving Station?	Life-Saving Station number	Life-Saving Station district	Coast Guard Station number	Reference
Coast Guard Station Annapolis	Annapolis	Unknown	Active	Unknown	Unknown	Unknown	Unknown	
Coast Guard Station Crisfield	Crisfield	Unknown	Active	Unknown	Unknown	Unknown	Unknown	
Coast Guard Station Green Run Inlet	Assateague Island	1875–1876	1939	Yes	5	5th	108	
Coast Guard Station Isle of Wight	Isle of Wight	1897	1948	Yes	Unknown	5th	145	
Coast Guard Station North Beach	North Beach	1883	1970	Yes	Unknown	5th	147	
Coast Guard Station Cove Point	Cove Point, Maryland	Unknown	Active	Yes	Unknown	5th	Unknown	Unknown
Coast Guard Station Ocean City	Ocean City	1878	Active	Yes	Unknown	4th	146	
Coast Guard Station Oxford	Oxford	Unknown	Active	Unknown	Unknown	Unknown	Unknown	
Coast Guard Station St. Inigoes	St. Inigoes	1976	Active	N/A	Unknown	N/A	Unknown	
Coast Guard Station Stillpond	Still Pond	Unknown	Active (seasonal)	Unknown	Unknown	Unknown	Unknown	

=== Washington, D.C. ===
Station	Location	Opened	Closed	Life-Saving Station?	Life-Saving Station number	Life-Saving Station district	Coast Guard Station number	Reference
Coast Guard Station Washington, D.C.	Washington, D.C.	2003	Active	Unknown	Unknown	Unknown	Unknown	

=== Virginia ===
Station	Location	Opened	Closed	Life-Saving Station?	Life-Saving Station number	Life-Saving Station district	Coast Guard Station number	Reference
Coast Guard Station Assateague Beach	Assateague Island	1875	1956	Yes	7	5th	150	
Coast Guard Station Cape Charles	Cape Charles	Unknown	Active	Unknown	Unknown	5th	Unknown	
Coast Guard Station Cape Henry	Cape Henry	1873	1906	Yes	1	6th	161	
Coast Guard Station Chincoteague	Chincoteague	Unknown	Active	Unknown	Unknown	5th	Unknown	
Coast Guard Station Cobb Island	Cobb Island	1875	1955	Yes	10	5th	157	
Coast Guard Station Dam Neck Mills	Dam Neck	1881	1938	Yes	3	6th	163	
Coast Guard Station False Cape	False Cape	1881	1946	Yes	5	6th	165	
Coast Guard Station Hog Island	Hog Island	1875	1964	Yes	9	5th	156	
Coast Guard Station Little Creek	Little Creek	Unknown	Active	Unknown	Unknown	5th	Unknown	
Coast Guard Station Little Island	Sandbridge	1878	1964	Yes	4	6th	164	
Coast Guard Station Little Machipongo Inlet	Hog Island	Unknown	Unknown	Unknown	Unknown	5th	Unknown	
Coast Guard Station Metompkin Inlet	Accomac	1888	1957 or 1964	Unknown	Unknown	5th	152	
Coast Guard Station Milford Haven	Hudgins	Unknown	Active	Unknown	Unknown	5th	Unknown	
Coast Guard Station Parramore Beach	Parramore Island	1874	1940	Unknown	8	5th	154	
Coast Guard Station Pope's Island	Assateague Island	1878	1965	Yes	9	5th	149	
Coast Guard Station Smith Island	Smith Island	1878	1955	Yes	11	5th	158	
Coast Guard Station Seatack	Virginia Beach	1878	Unknown	Yes	2	6th	162	
Coast Guard Station Wachapreague	Wachapreague	Unknown	Unknown	Unknown	Unknown	5th	Unknown	
Coast Guard Station Wallop's Beach	Wallops Island	1883	1947	Yes	Unknown	5th	151	
Coast Guard Base Portsmouth	Portsmouth					5th		

=== North Carolina ===
Station	Location	Opened	Closed	Life-Saving Station?	Life-Saving Station number	Life-Saving Station district	Coast Guard Station number	Reference
Coast Guard Station Big Kinnakeet	Avon	1872	1938	Yes	21	6th	182	
Coast Guard Station Bodie Island	Bodie Island	1878	1953	Yes	16	6th	175	
Coast Guard Station Bogue Inlet	Bogue Banks	1904	Active	Yes	Unknown	6th	192	
Coast Guard Station Caffey's Inlet	Duck	1875	1964	Yes	10	6th	170	
Coast Guard Station Cape Fear	Cape Fear	1881	1941	Yes	25	6th	193	
Coast Guard Station Cape Hatteras	Cape Hatteras	1882	Active	Yes	Unknown	Unknown	183	
Coast Guard Station Cape Lookout	Cape Lookout	1887	Active	Yes	24	6th	190	
Coast Guard Station Chicamacomico	Chicamacomico	1874	1954	Yes	18	6th	179	
Coast Guard Station Core Bank	Core Banks	1894	1965	Yes	Unknown	Unknown	189	
Coast Guard Station Creed's Hill	Hatteras	1878	1947	Yes	22	6th	184	
Coast Guard Station Currituck Inlet	Fruitville Township	1874	1950	Yes	7	6th	168	
Coast Guard Station Durant	Durant	1879	1939	Yes	23	6th	185	
Coast Guard Station Elizabeth City	Elizabeth City	Unknown	Active	Unknown	Unknown	Unknown	Unknown	
Coast Guard Station Emerald Isle	Emerald Isle	Unknown	Active	Unknown	Unknown	Unknown	Unknown	
Coast Guard Station Fort Macon	Bogue Banks	1904	1963	Yes	Unknown	Unknown	191	
Coast Guard Station Gull Shoal	Gull Shoal	1878	1940	Yes	Unknown	6th	180	
Coast Guard Station Hatteras Inlet	Hatteras Inlet	1882	1957	Yes	Unknown	Unknown	186	
Coast Guard Station Hobucken	Hobucken	Unknown	Active	Unknown	Unknown	Unknown	Unknown	
Coast Guard Station Kill Devil Hills	Kill Devil Hills	1878	1964	Yes	13	6th	173	
Coast Guard Station Kitty Hawk	Kitty Hawk	1878	1964	Yes	12	6th	172	
Coast Guard Station Little Kinnakeet	Avon	1873	1970	Yes	20	6th	181	
Coast Guard Station Nags Head	Nags Head	1874	1957	Yes	14	6th	174	
Coast Guard Station New Inlet	New Inlet	1883	1916?	Yes	Unknown	6th	Unknown	
Coast Guard Station Oak Island	Oak Island	1899	Active	Yes	Unknown	6th	194	
Coast Guard Station Ocracoke	Ocracoke	1904	Active	Yes	Unknown	6th	187	
Coast Guard Station Oregon Inlet	Oregon Inlet	1874	Active	Yes	16	6th	176	
Coast Guard Station Paul Gamiel Hill	Southern Shores	Unknown	1949	Yes	11	6th	171	
Coast Guard Station Pea Island	Pea Island	1871	1947	Yes	17	6th	177	
Coast Guard Station Portsmouth	Portsmouth	1894	1946	Yes	Unknown	6th	188	
Coast Guard Station Poyners Hill	Poyners Hill	1878	1956	Yes	9	6th	169	
Coast Guard Station Wash Woods	Wash Woods (VA.)	1878	1951	Yes	6	6th	166	
Coast Guard Station Whales Head	Corolla	1874	Unknown	Yes	8	6th	Unknown	
Coast Guard Station Wrightsville Beach	Wrightsville Beach	1957	Active	Unknown	Unknown	Unknown	Unknown	

== Southeast District ==
=== South Carolina ===
Station	Location	Opened	Closed	Life-Saving Station?	Life-Saving Station number	Life-Saving Station district	Coast Guard Station number	Reference
Coast Guard Station Georgetown	Georgetown	1989	Active	Unknown	Unknown	Unknown	Unknown	
Coast Guard Station Sullivan's Island	Sullivan's Island	1894–1895	Unknown	Yes	Unknown	Unknown	196	

=== Georgia ===
Station	Location	Opened	Closed	Life-Saving Station?	Life-Saving Station number	Life-Saving Station district	Coast Guard Station number	Reference
Coast Guard Station Brunswick	Brunswick	Unknown	Active	Unknown	Unknown	Unknown	Unknown	
Coast Guard Station Tybee Island	Tybee Island	1983	Active	Yes	Unknown	Unknown	Unknown	

=== Florida ===
Station	Location	Opened	Closed	Life-Saving Station?	Life-Saving Station number	Life-Saving Station district	Coast Guard Station number	Reference
Biscayne Bay House of Refuge	Miami Beach	1876	1930	Yes	5	7th	209	
Cape Malabar House of Refuge	Melbourne Beach	1886	1891	Yes	Unknown	7th	N/A	
Chester Shoal House of Refuge	Cape Canaveral	1884	1949	Unknown	Unknown	Unknown	204	
Coast Guard Station Cortez	Cortez	1974	Active	Unknown	Unknown	Unknown	Unknown	
Fort Lauderdale House of Refuge	Fort Lauderdale	1876	1930	Yes	4	7th	208	
Coast Guard Station Fort Myers Beach	Fort Myers	1963	Active	Unknown	Unknown	Unknown	Unknown	
Gilbert's Bar House of Refuge	Stuart	1876	1945	Yes	2	7th	207	
Indian River House of Refuge	Vero Beach	1876	1885	Yes	1	7th	N/A	
Indian River Inlet House of Refuge	Vero Beach	1885	1948	Yes	1	7th	206	
Coast Guard Station Islamorada	Islamorada	1965	Active	Yes	No	N/A	N/A	
Jupiter Inlet Life Saving Station	Jupiter	1885	1896	Yes	Unknown	7th	N/A	
Coast Guard Station Key West	Key West	Unknown	Active	Unknown	Unknown	Unknown	Unknown	
Coast Guard Station Lake Worth Inlet	Riviera Beach	Unknown	Active	Unknown	Unknown	Unknown	Unknown	
Coast Guard Station Marathon	Marathon	Unknown	Active	Unknown	Unknown	Unknown	Unknown	
Marquesas Keys House of Refuge	Marquesas Keys	Never opened	N/A	N/A	N/A	N/A	N/A	
Coast Guard Station Mayport	Mayport	Unknown	Active	Unknown	Unknown	Unknown	Unknown	
Coast Guard Station Miami Beach	Miami Beach	Unknown	Active	Unknown	Unknown	Unknown	Unknown	
Mosquito Lagoon House of Refuge	New Smyrna Beach	1886	1945	Yes	Unknown	Unknown	Unknown	
Orange Grove House of Refuge	Delray Beach	1876	1896	Yes	3	7th	N/A	
Coast Guard Station Ponce de Leon Inlet	New Smyrna Beach	Unknown	Active	Unknown	Unknown	Unknown	Unknown	
Coast Guard Station Port Canaveral	Port Canaveral	Unknown	Active	Unknown	Unknown	Unknown	Unknown	
Coast Guard Station Sand Key	Clearwater Beach	Unknown	Active	Unknown	Unknown	Unknown	Unknown	
Smith's Creek House of Refuge	Flagler Beach	1884	1948	Yes	Unknown	7th	Unknown	
Coast Guard Station Yankeetown	Yankeetown	Unknown	Active	Unknown	Unknown	Unknown	Unknown	

=== Puerto Rico ===
Station	Location	Opened	Closed	Life-Saving Station?	Life-Saving Station number	Life-Saving Station district	Coast Guard Station number	Reference
Coast Guard Station San Juan	San Juan	1993	Active	No	N/A	N/A	Unknown	

== Heartland District ==
=== Florida ===
Station	Location	Opened	Closed	Life-Saving Station?	Life-Saving Station number	Life-Saving Station district	Coast Guard Station number	Reference
Coast Guard Station Carrabelle	Carrabelle	Unknown	Active	Unknown	Unknown	Unknown	Unknown	
Coast Guard Station Destin	Destin	1977	Active	No	N/A	N/A	Unknown	
Coast Guard Station Panama City	Panama City	1933	Active	No	N/A	N/A	Unknown	
Coast Guard Station Pensacola	Pensacola	1885	Active	Yes	Unknown	7th	Unknown	
Coast Guard Station Santa Rosa	Santa Rosa Island	1885	Active	Yes	N/A	N/A	212	

=== Alabama ===
Station	Location	Opened	Closed	Life-Saving Station?	Life-Saving Station number	Life-Saving Station district	Coast Guard Station number	Reference
Coast Guard Station Dauphin Island	Dauphin Island	Unknown	Active	Unknown	N/A	N/A	N/A	

=== Mississippi ===
Station	Location	Opened	Closed	Life-Saving Station?	Life-Saving Station number	Life-Saving Station district	Coast Guard Station number	Reference
Coast Guard Station Gulfport	Gulfport	Unknown	Active	Unknown	N/A	N/A	N/A	
Coast Guard Station Natchez	Natchez	Unknown	Active	Unknown	N/A	N/A	N/A	
Coast Guard Station Pascagoula	Pascagoula	1929	Active	Yes	N/A	N/A	N/A	

=== Louisiana ===
Station	Location	Opened	Closed	Life-Saving Station?	Life-Saving Station number	Life-Saving Station district	Coast Guard Station number	Reference
Coast Guard Station Grand Isle	Grand Isle	Unknown	Active	No	N/A	N/A	Unknown	
Coast Guard Search and Rescue Station New Orleans	Metairie	Unknown	Active	No	N/A	N/A	Unknown	
Coast Guard Station Venice	Venice	Unknown	Active	No	N/A	N/A	Unknown	

=== Texas ===
Station	Location	Opened	Closed	Life-Saving Station?	Life-Saving Station number	Life-Saving Station district	Coast Guard Station number	Reference
Coast Guard Sector Houston	Houston	1963	Active	Yes	Unknown	Unknown	Unknown	
Coast Guard Station Aransas	Port Aransas	1878	Active	Yes	5	Unknown	Unknown	
Coast Guard Station Freeport	Surfside Beach	Unknown	Active	Unknown	Unknown	Unknown	Unknown	
Coast Guard Station Galveston	Galveston	Unknown	Active	Unknown	Unknown	Unknown	Unknown	
Coast Guard Station Port O'Connor	Port O'Connor	Unknown	Active	Unknown	Unknown	Unknown	Unknown	
Coast Guard Station Sabine Pass	Port Arthur	1879	1955	Yes	1	8th	216	
Coast Guard Station Saluria	Matagorda Island	1880	1942	Yes	4	8th	220	
Coast Guard Station San Luis	Galveston Island	1879	1950?	Yes	Unknown	8th	218	
Coast Guard Station South Padre Island	South Padre Island	1978	Active	Yes	6	8th	222	
Coast Guard Station Velasco	Velasco	1888	1914	Yes	Unknown	8th	219	

=== Kentucky ===
Station	Location	Opened	Closed	Life-Saving Station?	Life-Saving Station number	Life-Saving Station district	Coast Guard Station number	Reference
Coast Guard Station Louisville	Louisville	1881	1972	Yes	Unknown	Unknown	276	

== Great Lakes District ==
=== New York ===
Station	Location	Opened	Closed	Life-Saving Station?	Life-Saving Station number	Life-Saving Station district	Coast Guard Station number	Reference
Coast Guard Station Alexandria Bay	Alexandria Bay	Unknown	Active	Unknown	Unknown	Unknown	Unknown	
Coast Guard Station Buffalo	Buffalo	1877	Active	Yes	5	9th	235	
Coast Guard Station Galloo Island	Galloo Island	1874	1973	Yes	Unknown	9th	231	
Coast Guard Station Niagara	Niagara	1893	Active	Yes	Unknown	9th	234	
Coast Guard Station Oswego	Oswego	1875	Active	Yes	3	9th	232	
Coast Guard Station Rochester	Rochester	1875	Active	Yes	4	9th	233	
Coast Guard Station Sackett's Harbor	Sackett's Harbor	Post-1874	Post-1915	Yes	1	9th	231	
Coast Guard Station Salmon Creek	Salmon Creek	1877	1886	Yes	2	9th	N/A	

=== Pennsylvania ===
Station	Location	Opened	Closed	Life-Saving Station?	Life-Saving Station number	Life-Saving Station district	Coast Guard Station number	Reference
Coast Guard Station Erie	Erie	1876	Active	Yes	6	9th	236	

=== Ohio ===
Station	Location	Opened	Closed	Life-Saving Station?	Life-Saving Station number	Life-Saving Station district	Coast Guard Station number	Reference
Coast Guard Station Ashtabula	Ashtabula	1893	Active	Yes	Unknown	9th	237	
Coast Guard Station Cleveland Harbor	Cleveland	1875	Active	Yes	Unknown	9th	Unknown	
Coast Guard Station Fairport	Fairport	1876	Active	Yes	7	9th	238	
Coast Guard Station Lorain	Lorain	1908	Active	Yes	Unknown	9th	240	
Coast Guard Station Marblehead	Marblehead	1876	Active	Yes	Unknown	9th	Unknown	
Coast Guard Station Toledo	Toledo	1938?	Active	No	N/A	N/A	Unknown	

=== Michigan ===
Station	Location	Opened	Closed	Life-Saving Station?	Life-Saving Station number	Life-Saving Station district	Coast Guard Station number	Reference
Coast Guard Station Alpena AUXOP	Alpena	1988	Active	No	N/A	9th	Unknown	
Coast Guard Station Beaver Island	Beaver Island	1875	1922	Yes	1	11th	257	
Coast Guard Station Belle Isle	Detroit	1881	active	Yes	Unknown	11th	Unknown	
Coast Guard Station Bois Blanc	Bois Blanc Township	1890	1956	Yes	Unknown	11th	255	
Coast Guard Station Charlevoix	Charlevoix	1899	Pre-1969	Yes	Unknown	11th	258	
Coast Guard Station Crisp Point	Munising	1876	Pre-1960	Yes	Unknown	11th	Unknown	
Coast Guard Station Deer Park	Deer Park	1876	1955	Yes	Unknown	11th	295	
Coast Guard Station Eagle Harbor	Eagle Harbor Township	1905	Pre-1954	Yes	Unknown	11th	299	
Coast Guard Station Frankfort	Frankfort	1887	Active	Yes	Unknown	11th	Unknown	
Coast Guard Station Grand Haven	Grand Haven	1875	Active	Yes	9	11th	270	
Coast Guard Station Grand Marais	Grand Marais	1899	Active	Yes	Unknown	11th	296	
Coast Guard Station Grand Point Au Sable	Grand Point Au Sable	1876	1954	Yes	6	11th	279	
Coast Guard Station Grindstone City	Grindstone City	1878	1939	Yes	Unknown	Unknown	Unknown	
Coast Guard Station Hammond Bay	Rogers Township	1876	1968	Yes	Unknown	11th	254	
Coast Guard Station Harbor Beach	Harbor Beach	1881	Active	Yes	Unknown	11th	Unknown	
Coast Guard Station Holland	Holland	1885	2022	Yes	Unknown	11th	Unknown	
Coast Guard Station Lake View Beach	Lakeport	1898	1946	Yes	Unknown	11th	246	
Coast Guard Station Ludington	Ludington	1879	Active	Yes	7	11th	266	
Coast Guard Station Manistee	Manistee	1879	Active	Yes	5	11th	264	
Coast Guard Station Marquette	Marquette	1890	Active	Yes	Unknown	11th	298	
Coast Guard Station Middle Island	Marquette Township	Circa 1879	Pre-1958	Yes	Unknown	11th	258	
Coast Guard Station Muskegon	Muskegon	1890	Active	No	8	11th	269	
Coast Guard Station North Manitou	North Manitou Island	1876	1939	Yes	2	11th	259	
Coast Guard Station Pentwater	Pentwater	1886	Pre-1965	Yes	Unknown	11th	267	
Coast Guard Station Point Betsie	Frankfort	1875	1946	Yes	4	11th	262	
Coast Guard Station Pointe Aux Barques	Pointe Aux Barques	1875	1956	Yes	2	10th	248	
Coast Guard Station Port Huron	Port Huron	1932	Active	No	N/A	11th	N/A	
Coast Guard Station Saginaw River	Essexville	Unknown	Active	Unknown	Unknown	11th	Unknown	
Coast Guard Station Saint Ignace	Saint Ignace	Unknown	Active	Unknown	Unknown	11th	Unknown	
Coast Guard Station Sand Beach	Harbor Beach	1881	Active	1928	1	10th	247	
Coast Guard Station Sault Ste. Marie	Sault Ste. Marie	1916	2005	No	N/A	11th	N/A	
Coast Guard Station Ship Canal	Portage	1884	Active	Yes	13	10th	300	
Coast Guard Station Sleeping Bear Point	Glenn Haven	1901	1955	Yes	3	11th	261	
Coast Guard Station South Haven	South Haven	1886	Active	Yes	Unknown	11th	272	
Coast Guard Station South Manitou Island	South Manitou Island	1900	Pre-1962	Yes	Unknown	11th	260	
Coast Guard Station St. Joseph	St. Joseph	1874	Active	Yes	Unknown	11th	Unknown	
Coast Guard Station Sturgeon Point	Haynes Township	1875	Pre-1960	Yes	5	10th	251	
Coast Guard Station Tawas	East Tawas	1876	Active	Yes	4	10th	250	
Coast Guard Station Thunder Bay Island	Thunder Bay Island	1876	1951	Yes	6	10th	252	
Coast Guard Station Two Heart River	Unknown	1876	1945	Yes	11	10th	294	
Coast Guard Station Vermillion Point	Whitefish Township	1876	1940	Yes	Unknown	11th	292	
Coast Guard Station White River	Montague	1886	1947	Yes	Unknown	11th	268	

=== Indiana ===
Station	Location	Opened	Closed	Life-Saving Station?	Life-Saving Station number	Life-Saving Station district	Coast Guard Station number	Reference
Coast Guard Station Michigan City	Michigan City	1888	Active	Yes	Unknown	Unknown	274	

=== Illinois ===
Station	Location	Opened	Closed	Life-Saving Station?	Life-Saving Station number	Life-Saving Station district	Coast Guard Station number	Reference
Coast Guard Station Calumet Harbor	Chicago	1934	Active	Unknown	Unknown	11th	278	
Coast Guard Station Chicago	Chicago	1875	1968	Yes	Unknown	11th	280	
Coast Guard Station Jackson Park	Jackson Park	1892	1963	Yes	11	11	279	
Coast Guard Station Wilmette Harbor	Wilmette	1877	Active	Yes	12	11th	12	

=== Wisconsin ===
Station	Location	Opened	Closed	Life-Saving Station?	Life-Saving Station number	Life-Saving Station district	Coast Guard Station number	Reference
Coast Guard Station Bayfield	Bayfield	Unknown	Active	Unknown	Unknown	11th	Unknown	
Coast Guard Station Baileys Harbor	Baileys Harbor	1895	1948	Yes	Unknown	11th	289	
Coast Guard Station Green Bay	Green Bay	Unknown	Active	Unknown	Unknown	11th	Unknown	
Coast Guard Station Kenosha	Kenosha	1879	Active	Yes	13	11th	282	
Coast Guard Station Kewaunee	Kewaunee	1893	1947	Yes	Unknown	11th	287	
Coast Guard Station Milwaukee	Milwaukee	1875	Pre-1970	Yes	15	11th	284	
Coast Guard Station Plum Island	Washington	1896	Active	Yes	Unknown	11th	290	
Coast Guard Station Racine	Racine	1875	1971	Yes	14	11th	283	
Coast Guard Station Sheboygan	Sheboygan	1875	Active	Yes	16	11th	285	
Coast Guard Station Sturgeon Bay	Sturgeon Bay	1885	Active	Yes	Unknown	11th	288	
Coast Guard Station Two Rivers	Two Rivers	1875	Active	Yes	17	11th	286	
Coast Guard Station (Small) Washington Island	Washington, Door County	1902	Active	Yes	Unknown	11th	Unknown	

=== Minnesota ===
Station	Location	Opened	Closed	Life-Saving Station?	Life-Saving Station number	Life-Saving Station district	Coast Guard Station number	Reference
Coast Guard Station Duluth	Duluth	1894	Active	Yes	Unknown	11th	304 (originally 265)	

== Southwest District ==
=== California ===
Station	Location	Opened	Closed	Life-Saving Station?	Life-Saving Station number	Life-Saving Station district	Coast Guard Station number	Reference
Coast Guard Station Arena Cove	Point Arena	1902	1958	Yes	Unknown	Unknown	314	
Coast Guard Station Bodega Bay	Bodega Bay	1889	Active	Yes	Unknown	Unknown	Unknown	
Coast Guard Station Bolinas Bay	Bolinas	1881	1947	Yes	6	12th	312	
Coast Guard Station Channel Islands Harbor	Oxnard	Unknown	Active	Unknown	Unknown	Unknown	Unknown	
Coast Guard Station Fort Point	Presidio of San Francisco	1889	1990	Yes	Unknown	Unknown	310	
Coast Guard Station Golden Gate	Sausalito	Unknown	Active	Unknown	Unknown	Unknown	Unknown	
Coast Guard Station Golden Gate Park	San Francisco	1877	1951	Yes	7	12th	309	
Coast Guard Station Humboldt Bay	Eureka	1878	Active	Yes	5	12th	316	
Coast Guard Station Lake Tahoe	Tahoe City	Unknown	Active	Unknown	Unknown	Unknown	Unknown	
Coast Guard Station Los Angeles Long Beach	San Pedro	Unknown	Active	Unknown	Unknown	Unknown	Unknown	
Coast Guard Station Monterey	Monterey	Unknown	Active	Unknown	Unknown	Unknown	Unknown	
Coast Guard Station Morro Bay	Morro Bay	Unknown	Active	Unknown	Unknown	Unknown	Unknown	
Coast Guard Station Noyo River	Noyo River	Unknown	Active	Unknown	Unknown	Unknown	Unknown	
Coast Guard Station Point Bonita	Mill Valley	1899	1947	Yes	Unknown	Unknown	311	
Coast Guard Station Point Reyes	Point Reyes	1899	Pre-1969	Yes	Unknown	Unknown	313	
Coast Guard Station Rio Vista	Rio Vista	Unknown	Active	Unknown	Unknown	Unknown	Unknown	
Coast Guard Station San Diego	San Diego	Unknown	Active	Unknown	Unknown	Unknown	Unknown	
Coast Guard Station San Francisco	San Francisco	1939	Active	Unknown	Unknown	Unknown	Unknown	
Coast Guard Station Southside	San Francisco	1893	1945	Yes	Unknown	Unknown	308	
Coast Guard Station Vallejo	Vallejo	Unknown	Active	Unknown	Unknown	Unknown	Unknown	

== Northwest District ==
=== Oregon ===
Station	Location	Opened	Closed	Life-Saving Station?	Life-Saving Station number	Life-Saving Station district	Coast Guard Station number	Reference
Coast Guard Station Chetco River	Harbor	1961	Active	No	N/A	12th	Unknown	
Aids to Navigation Team (ANT) Coos Bay	Coos Bay	1976	Active	No	N/A	Unknown	Unknown	
Coast Guard Station Coos Bay	Coos Bay	1878	1955	Yes	4	12th	320	
Coast Guard Station Coquille River	Bandon	1890	Active	Yes	Unknown	12th	Unknown	
Coast Guard Station Depoe Bay	Depoe Bay	1940	Active	Unknown	Unknown	12th	Unknown	
Coast Guard Station Point Adams	Warrenton	1889	1967	Yes	311	12th	326	
Coast Guard Station Port Orford	Port Orford	1934	1970	No	N/A	12th	Unknown	
Coast Guard Station Portland	Portland	1997	Active	No	N/A	12th	Unknown	
Coast Guard Station Siuslaw River	Florence	1917	Active	No	N/A	12th	Unknown	
Coast Guard Station Tillamook Bay	Garibaldi	1907	Active	Yes	312	12th	325	
Coast Guard Station Umpqua River	Winchester Bay	1891	Active	Yes	Unknown	12th	321	
Coast Guard Station Yaquina Bay	Newport	1895	Active	Yes	Unknown	12th	323	

=== Washington ===
Station	Location	Opened	Closed	Life-Saving Station?	Life-Saving Station number	Life-Saving Station district	Coast Guard Station number	Reference
Coast Guard Station Bellingham	Bellingham	1977	Active	No	N/A	13th	Unknown	
Coast Guard Station Cape Disappointment	Ilwaco	1877	Active	Yes	3	12th	327	
Coast Guard Station Grays Harbor	Grays Harbor	1897	Active	Yes	Unknown	12th	330	
Coast Guard Station Klipsan Beach	Ocean Park	1891	1949	Yes	Unknown	12th	309	
National Motor Lifeboat School, Cape Disappointment, Ilwaco	Ilwaco	1968 (1980)	Active	Unknown	Unknown	Unknown	Unknown	
Coast Guard Station Neah Bay	Neah Bay	Unknown	Active	Yes	1	12th	332	
Coast Guard Station Port Angeles	Port Angeles	2003	Active	No	N/A	13th	Unknown	
Coast Guard Station Quillayute River	La Push	Unknown	Active	Unknown	Unknown	13th	Unknown	
Coast Guard Station Seattle	Seattle	1989	Active	No	N/A	13th	Unknown	
Coast Guard Station Willapa Bay	Willapa Bay Shoreline	1887	Active	Yes	2	12th	329	

== Oceania District ==
=== Hawaii ===
Station	Location	Opened	Closed	Life-Saving Station?	Life-Saving Station number	Life-Saving Station district	Coast Guard Station number	Reference
Coast Guard Station Honolulu	Honolulu	Unknown	Active	Unknown	Unknown	Unknown	Unknown	
Coast Guard Station Maui	Maui	Unknown	Active	Unknown	Unknown	Unknown	Unknown	
Coast Guard Station Kauaʻi	Kauaʻi	Unknown	Active	Unknown	Unknown	Unknown	Unknown	

=== Guam ===
Station	Location	Opened	Closed	Life-Saving Station?	Life-Saving Station number	Life-Saving Station district	Coast Guard Station number	Reference
Coast Guard Station Apra Harbor	Apra Harbor	Unknown	Active	Unknown	Unknown	Unknown	Unknown	

== Arctic District ==
=== Alaska ===
Station	Location	Opened	Closed	Life-Saving Station?	Life-Saving Station number	Life-Saving Station district	Coast Guard Station number	Reference
Coast Guard Base Kodiak	Kodiak	1947	Active	No	N/A	17th	Unknown	
Coast Guard Station Juneau	Juneau	Mid-1950s	Active	No	N/A	17th	Unknown	
Coast Guard Station Ketchikan	Ketchikan	Unknown	Active	Unknown	Unknown	17th	Unknown	
Coast Guard Station Nome	Nome	1905	1949	Yes	Unknown	17th	305	
Coast Guard Station Valdez	Valdez	2004	Active	No	N/A	17th	Unknown	

== See also ==
- List of United States military bases
- United States Coast Guard Air Stations
- United States Coast Guard History and Heritage Sites
