= List of shipwrecks in March 1877 =

The list of shipwrecks in March 1877 includes ships sunk, foundered, grounded, or otherwise lost during March 1877.

== 1 March ==
List of shipwrecks: 1 March 1877
Ship	State	Description
Calder	United Kingdom	The steamship caught fire in the River Mersey. She was on a voyage from Lisbon, Portugal to Liverpool, Lancashire.
Cettois	France	The steamship collided with another steamship and sank at "Faraman".
Christopher Hansteen	Norway	The brig was abandoned in the North Sea 20 nautical miles (37 km) off Whitby, Yorkshire, United Kingdom. Her crew were rescued by the Whitby Lifeboat Robert Whitworth ( Royal National Lifeboat Institution). Christopher Hansteen was on a voyage from Christiania to Leith, Lothian, United Kingdom. She was subsequently towed in to the River Tees in a capsized condition by the steamship Minthorpe (United Kingdom).
Lake Megantic	Canada	The steamship ran aground in the Chesapeake River 20 nautical miles (37 km) downstream of Baltimore, Maryland, United States. She was on a voyage from Liverpool, Lancashire, United Kingdom to Baltimore. She was refloated and taken in to Baltimore.
Maria	France	The ship was driven ashore and wrecked 2 nautical miles (3.7 km) west of Dunkirk, Nord. Her crew were rescued by a pilot cutter.
Strathnairn	United Kingdom	The ship ran aground in the Bangka Strait. She was on a voyage from North Shields, Northumberland to Singapore, Straits Settlements.

== 2 March ==
List of shipwrecks: 2 March 1877
Ship	State	Description
Conflict	United Kingdom	The ship ran aground off Rhosneigr, Anglesey. She was on a voyage from San Francisco, California, United States to Liverpool, Lancashire. She was refloated.
Friends	United Kingdom	The schooner ran aground at Preston, Lancashire. She was on a voyage from Preston to Havre de Grâce, Seine-Inférieure, France. She was refloated and resumed her voyage, but put in to Liverpool in a leaky condition.
Grace	United Kingdom	The Mersey Flat collided with the Mersey Flat Ann Grace (United Kingdom) in the Rock Channel and was beached at Dove Point in a waterlogged condition. She was refloated and taken in to Liverpool.
Himalaya	United Kingdom	The ship ran aground on the Kentish Knock. She was refloated and resumed her voyage.
Margaret and Lucy	United States	The schooner stranded on a bar 1.75 miles (2.8 km) north of the Toms River Life-Saving Station at Toms River, New Jersey, during a rainstorm. She broke up immediately with the loss of all seven hands.
Melina	United Kingdom	The schooner was driven ashore at Waterford. She was on a voyage from Cardiff, Glamorgan to Waterford. She was refloated the next day.
Unnamed	Flag unknown	The ship ran aground on the Nore. She was refloated.

== 3 March ==
List of shipwrecks: 3 March 1877
Ship	State	Description
Arina	United Kingdom	The schooner ran aground on the Shipwash Sand, in the North Sea off the coast of Suffolk. She was on a voyage from London to Hartlepool, County Durham. She was refloated and put in to Great Yarmouth, Norfolk in a leaky condition.
Eliza	United Kingdom	The schooner ran aground at Waterford. She was on a voyage from London to Wexford. She was refloated and beached.
Elizabeth Scown	United Kingdom	The schooner Elizabeth Scown of Bude, loaded with stone for church restoration, struck Bude breakwater on Saturday night. The Bude Royal National Lifeboat Institution lifeboat Elizabeth Moore Garden was returning to harbour after being unable to rescue the crew when it capsized. The lifeboat self-righted, but the Coxswain James Maynard was lost. The crew of Elizabeth Scown survived.
Ennismore	United Kingdom	The steamship ran aground on Wallace's Rock, off the coast of County Antrim. She was on a voyage from Whitehaven, Cumberland to the Clyde. She was refloated and resumed her voyage.
Industry	United Kingdom	The sloop was driven ashore east of Brancaster, Norfolk.
Gan Giovanni	Italy	The brig was driven ashore at Gallipoli, Ottoman Empire. She was on a voyage from Bourgas, Ottoman Empire to Marseille, Bouches-du-Rhône, France.
Ocean	United Kingdom	The smack was run down by the steamship John Ormston (United Kingdom) and sank in the North Sea 70 nautical miles (130 km) off Flamborough Head, Yorkshire with the loss of two of her crew. Survivors were rescued by John Ormston.
Paquebot	France	The schooner collided with the barque Laura (Norway) off Penarth, Glamorgan, United Kingdom and was abandoned. Her crew were rescued by Laura. Paquebot was on a voyage from Quimper, Finistère to Cardiff, Glamorgan. She was beached with assistance from the tug John Bull (United Kingdom). Following repairs, she was refloated and taken in to Cardiff on 5 March.

== 4 March ==
List of shipwrecks: 4 March 1877
Ship	State	Description
Commonwealth	United Kingdom	The steamship ran aground off Deal, Kent. She was on a voyage from South Shields, County Durham to Aden, Aden Colony.
Flower of Buchan	United Kingdom	The schooner was driven ashore at South Shields, County Durham. She was on a voyage from South Shields to Peterhead, Aberdeenshire. She was refloated.
Lord Byron	United Kingdom	The steamship ran aground at Maassluis, South Holland, Netherlands. She was refloated and resumed her voyage.
Nadalin	Italy	The ship was wrecked at "Snedia", Ottoman Syria. Her crew were rescued.
Nova Scotian	Canada	The barque foundered. Her crew were rescued by the brigantine Randolph Payson ( Canada). Nova Scotian was on a voyage from New York to London, United Kingdom.
Reint Peter	Sweden	The ship sank at Halmstad. Her crew were rescued.
Friedrich der Grosse	Germany	The ship was driven ashore on Skagen, Denmark. She was on a voyage from Leith, Lothian, United Kingdom to Danzig. She was refloated and resumed her voyage.

== 5 March ==
List of shipwrecks: 5 March 1877
Ship	State	Description
Dori	United Kingdom	The ship ran aground and was damaged at Dunkirk, Nord, France.
Hartlepool	United Kingdom	The steamship collided with the steamship Cygnet (United Kingdom) and sank at Vlissingen, Zeeland, Netherlands.
Pia	Italy	The brig was wrecked at Cape Ortegal, Spain. Her crew were rescued.
Rimedio	Italy	The ship was driven ashore at Capo Passero, Sicily. Her crew were rescued. She was on a voyage from Catania, Sicily to Cette, Hérault, France.

== 6 March ==
List of shipwrecks: 6 March 1877
Ship	State	Description
Eclipse	(United Kingdom of Great Britain and Ireland) Guernsey	The schooner struck a submerged object 2 nautical miles (3.7 km) off A Coruña, Spain and was holed. She sank 6 nautical miles (11 km) off the Cape Prior Lighthouse. Her crew survived. She was on a voyage from Jersey, Channel Islands to A Coruña.

== 7 March ==
List of shipwrecks: 7 March 1877
Ship	State	Description
Broomside	United Kingdom	The steamship struck the pier and sank at Sunderland, County Durham. Her eighteen crew were rescued; some of them by rocket apparatus. She was on a voyage from Sunderland to Bordeaux, Gironde, France.
Crystal	United Kingdom	The ship ran aground on the Swash, in the Bristol Channel off the coast of Somerset. She was on a voyage from Roscoff, Finistère, France to Bristol, Gloucestershire.
Dale	United Kingdom	The steamship ran aground at Leith, Lothian. She was on a voyage from Leith to Bangkok, Siam. She was refloated and resumed her voyage.
Inkerman	United Kingdom	The Mersey Flat sank at Liverpool, Lancashire. All seven people on board were rescued.
James	United Kingdom	The steamship was driven ashore at Belhaven, Lothian. Her four crew were rescued by the Dunbar Lifeboat.
Jane Roper	United Kingdom	The schooner collided with Alexandrovna (Russia) at Liverpool. She was towed clear by the tug Surprise (United Kingdom) and was beached at New Ferry, Cheshire.
Liberty	United Kingdom	The ship was driven ashore at Stepper Point, Cornwall. She was on a voyage from Waterford to Newquay, Cornwall. She was refloated.
Lotus	United Kingdom	The fishing coble capsized off the coast of Marsden, County Durham with the loss of all three crew.
Maria	United Kingdom	The smack was wrecked at Bude, Cornwall with the loss of her captain.
Mary	United Kingdom	The galiot ran aground on the South Bull, off Drogheda, County Louth and was wrecked. Her crew were rescued by the Drogheda Lifeboat. She was on a voyage from Maryport, Cumberland to Rostrevor, County Down.
Runcorn	United Kingdom	The schooner was driven ashore at Liverpool.

== 8 March ==
List of shipwrecks: 8 March 1877
Ship	State	Description
August	United Kingdom	The Thames barge was driven ashore at Westgate-on-Sea, Kent.
Chancellor	United Kingdom	The ship ran aground on the Lavan Sands, in the Menai Strait. She was being towed from Liverpool, Lancashire to Bristol, Gloucestershire.
Chatsworth	United Kingdom	The steamship ran aground in the Dardanelles. She was on a voyage from Cardiff, Glamorgan to Constantinople, Ottoman Empire. She was refloated on 11 March and resumed her voyage two days later.
Crocodile	United Kingdom	The brig ran aground at Cardiff, Glamorgan. She was refloated.
Garron Tower	United Kingdom	The ship ran aground at Dunkirk, Nord. She was on a voyage from Sunderland, County Durham to Dunkirk. She was refloated the next day and taken in to Dunkirk.
Lorn	United Kingdom	The schooner ran aground at Ryde, Isle of Wight. She was on a voyage from Barrow-in-Furness, Lancashire to Honfleur, Manche, France.
Meredith	United Kingdom	The steamship ran aground at "Fort Augusta". She was on a voyage from "Fort Augusta" to Jacmel, Haiti. She was refloated and resumed her voyage.
Nestor, and Warkworth	United Kingdom	The steamship Nestor ran aground at Boulogne, Pas-de-Calais, France and was then run into by the steamship Warkworth and was severely damaged. She was refloated. Warkworth put back to Boulogne in a leaky condition.
Orion	Norway	The barque was driven ashore at Lavernock Point, Glamorgan, United Kingdom.
St. Catherine	United Kingdom	The schooner was driven ashore at Lavernock Point.

== 9 March ==
List of shipwrecks: 9 March 1877
Ship	State	Description
Maria	United Kingdom	The abandoned barque was driven ashore on Faial Island, Azores.
Maryland	Germany	The ship collided with the barque Porro (Norway) in the English Channel off Beachy Head, Sussex, United Kingdom. Her 21 crew took to the boats; they were rescued by the steamship Malleable (United Kingdom). Maryland was on a voyage from Philadelphia, Pennsylvania, United States to Bremen. She was towed in to Portsmouth, Hampshire, United Kingdom the next day and sank there. She was refloated on 17 March.
Memem	United Kingdom	The tug ran aground on a reef in the Red Sea and was abandoned by her fifteen crew. She was on a voyage from Port Glasgow, Renfrewshire to Bangkok, Siam.
Moliere	France	The ship was driven ashore at Honfleur, Manche. She was on a voyage from Rouen, Seine-Inférieure to the Cape Verde Islands. She was refloated and resumed her voyage.
Unnamed	United Kingdom	The steamship was driven ashore at Honfleur. She was refloated.

== 10 March ==
List of shipwrecks: 10 March 1877
Ship	State	Description
Agnes	New South Wales	The brigantine was wrecked on the breakwater at Wollongong, New South Wales, while arriving in ballast from Sydney.
Charlotte Padbury	United Kingdom	The barque was driven ashore at Mundens Point, Saint Helena. She was on a voyage from the Swan River, Western Australia to London. She was refloated and resumed her voyage.

== 11 March ==
List of shipwrecks: 11 March 1877
Ship	State	Description
Ann Alice, and Armenian	United Kingdom	The schooner Ann Alice collided with the steamship Armenian and sank off The Skerries, Anglesey with the loss of a crew member. She was on a voyage from Runcorn, Cheshire to Dublin. Armenian was severely damaged. She was on a voyage from Huelva, Spain to Liverpool, Lancashire.
Ebenezer	United Kingdom	The ship ran aground on the Horsens, in the North Sea off the Dutch coast. She was refloated and taken in to the Nieuw Diep.

== 12 March ==
List of shipwrecks: 12 March 1877
Ship	State	Description
Christina	United States	The schooner was driven ashore near "Insum" or "Tusum". She was on a voyage from Philadelphia, Pennsylvania, to Bremen, Germany. She was later refloated.
Leonie	United Kingdom	The brig was run into by the steamship Consett (United Kingdom) and sank in the North Sea with the loss of six of her nine crew. Leonie was on a voyage from Gravesend, Kent to Newcastle upon Tyne, Northumberland.
Paul	Germany	The schooner was driven ashore in the Nieuw Diep. She was on a voyage from Antwerp, Belgium to Königsberg.
Sarah	Canada	The barque was driven ashore and wrecked south of Workington, Cumberland, United Kingdom. Her seventeen crew survived. She was on a voyage from New York, United States to Silloth, Cumberland.
Swift	United Kingdom	The brigantine was wrecked on the Filly Tail Rocks on the coast of Yorkshire. Her crew were rescued.
Unnamed	United Kingdom	The schooner was driven ashore near "Imsum".

== 13 March ==
List of shipwrecks: 13 March 1877
Ship	State	Description
Cap Horn	France	The barque ran aground on the Brock Bank, in the Elbe. She was on a voyage from Hamburg, Germany to Bordeaux, Gironde. She was refloated and towed in to Ostend, West Flanders, Belgium in a sinking condition.
Equestrian	United Kingdom	The ship ran aground at Bridlington, Yorkshire. She was on a voyage from Portsmouth, Hampshire to Sunderland, County Durham.
Kalema	United Kingdom	The barque was severely damaged by fire at Liverpool, Lancashire.
Norfolk	United Kingdom	The steamship was driven ashore at Sunk Island, Yorkshire.

== 14 March ==
List of shipwrecks: 14 March 1877
Ship	State	Description
Agatha	Netherlands	The ship was wrecked on Sylt, Germany. She was on a voyage from Brake, Germany to Fredrikshald, Norway.
Vigil	United Kingdom	The schooner collided with the gunboat HMS Tyrian (Royal Navy) 5 nautical miles (9.3 km) off Girdleness, Aberdeenshire and was severely damaged. She was on a voyage from Banff, Aberdeenshire to South Shields, County Durham. She was towed in to Aberdeen by HMS Tyrian.
Unnamed	United Kingdom	The steam lighter sank in Loch Lomond with the loss of three of the eight people on board. She was on a voyage from Balloch, Dunbartonshire to Luss, Argyllshire.

== 15 March ==
List of shipwrecks: 15 March 1877
Ship	State	Description
Saucy Jack	United Kingdom	The fishing boat was run down and sank off St Mary's Island, Northumberland by the schooner Kotka (Russia. Her crew were rescued by Kotka.
Vivid	United Kingdom	The ship was driven ashore at Combe Martin, Devon. Her crew were rescued. She was on a voyage from Cardiff, Glamorgan to Ilfracombe, Devon.

== 16 March ==
List of shipwrecks: 16 March 1877
Ship	State	Description
Concordia	Germany	The schooner was wrecked on the Bril Reef, off Makassar, Netherlands East Indies. Her crew were rescued. She was on a voyage from Surabaya, Netherlands East Indies to Saigon, French Indo-China.
Halley	United Kingdom	The steamship ran aground at New York, United States. She was on a voyage from Rio de Janeiro, Brazil to New York. She was refloated and taken in to New York.

== 17 March ==
List of shipwrecks: 17 March 1877
Ship	State	Description
Aboyne	United Kingdom	The barque was driven ashore and wrecked in the Lacepede Islands, Western Australia with the loss of six lives.
Albert Victor	Victoria	The barque was driven ashore and wrecked in the Lacepede Islands.
Anna Maria	United Kingdom	The steamship ran aground on the Gaa Bank, off the mouth of the River Tay and sank. Her crew were rescued by the tug Flying Scotsman (United Kingdom). Anna Maria was on a voyage from Sunderland, County Durham to Dundee, Forfarshire.
Bessie	Flag unknown	The schooner was driven ashore and wrecked in the Lacepede Islands.
Cingalee	Victoria	The ship was driven ashore and wrecked in the Lacepede Islands.
City of Foochow	United Kingdom	The ship was wrecked on Flinders Island, Tasmania. Her crew survived. She was on a voyage from Sydney, New South Wales to Calcutta, India.
Helen Malcolm	Victoria	The barque was driven ashore and wrecked in the Lacepede Islands.
Isabella	Victoria	The brig was driven ashore and wrecked in the Lacepede Islands.
Lady Octavia	United Kingdom	The ship was driven ashore in the Hooghly River. She was on a voyage from Calcutta, India to London. She was later refloated.
Margaret Owen	United Kingdom	The ship was driven ashore at Zingst, Germany. Her crew were rescued.
Mary Smith	United Kingdom	The schooner was driven ashore and wrecked in the Lacepede Islands.
Rapid	United Kingdom	The ship was driven ashore at "North Hermoly". Her crew were rescued. She was on a voyage from Turku, Grand Duchy of Finland to Torrevieja, Spain. She was refloated on 3 April and towed in to Stralsund, Germany.
Rusland	Belgium	Rusland aground, from Harper's Weekly, 7 April 1877. Bound from Antwerp, Belgium, to New York City carrying either 200 passengers or 200 passengers and crew (sources disagree) and a cargo of plate glass and iron wire, the 2,538-gross register ton Red Star Line steamship was wrecked at Long Branch, New Jersey, United States in a gale with heavy fog, coming to rest on top of the wreck of the barque Adonis (Bremen). All on board survived and had been brought ashore by the morning of 18 March. She broke in half on 8 April and was declared a total loss, and her wreck eventually sank in 25 feet (8 m) of water. Her wreck and that of Adonis are known as the "Dual Wrecks."

== 18 March ==
List of shipwrecks: 18 March 1877
Ship	State	Description
Brigadier	United Kingdom	The steamship was driven ashore and wrecked on Anholt, Denmark. She was on a voyage from Copenhagen, Denmark to Newcastle upon Tyne, Northumberland.
May Queen	New Zealand	The 78-ton schooner departed from Auckland for Tonga. No further trace, presumed foundered with the loss of all nine crew.
Messenger	United Kingdom	The brig was abandoned in the Bay of Biscay with the loss of three of her five crew. Survivors were rescued by the steamship Olindo (United Kingdom). Messenger was discovered on 20 April by the steamship Astarte (United Kingdom), which set her afire and sunk her.
Rio Bento, and Toward	United Kingdom	The steamships collided in the Clyde at Bowling, Dunbartonshire and were both severely damaged. Toward sank. She was on a voyage from Limerick to Glasgow, Renfrewshire. She was refloated on 29 March. Rio Bento ran aground.

== 19 March ==
List of shipwrecks: 19 March 1877
Ship	State	Description
Alfred	United Kingdom	The schooner ran aground on the Doran Rock, in the Strangford Lough. She was on a voyage from "Arkeen" to Glasgow, Renfrewshire.
Fairby	United Kingdom	The Thames barge collided with the steamship Rainbow and sank in the River Thames with the loss of two of the three people on board.
Gadden	United States	The ship was driven ashore at Martha's Vineyard, Massachusetts. She was on a voyage from the Cape Verde Islands to Portland, Maine.
Johanna	Germany	The galiot ran aground on the Haisborough Sands, in the North Sea off the coast of Norfolk, United Kingdom. She was on a voyage from Cork to Newcastle upon Tyne, Northumberland, United Kingdom. She was refloated and assisted in to Great Yarmouth, Norfolk.
Ocean Mail	United Kingdom	The ship was wrecked in the Chatham Islands. All on board were rescued. She was on a voyage from London to Wellington, New Zealand.
Roanoke	United States	The brig was wrecked at sea with the loss of eleven of the twelve people on board. The survivor was rescued on 28 March. She was on a voyage from Philadelphia to La Guaira, Venezuela.
Sultan	United Kingdom	The ship was driven ashore in the River Thames downstream of Tilbury, Essex. She was on a voyage from Saint-Malo, Ille-et-Vilaine, France to London.

== 20 March ==
List of shipwrecks: 20 March 1877
Ship	State	Description
Clyde	New Zealand	The 40-ton schooner went ashore on the Māhia Peninsula and was wrecked while she was en route from Lyttelton Harbour to Auckland. Her crew were rescued.
Jane	United Kingdom	The smack collided with the smack Surprise (United Kingdom) and was abandoned with the loss of her captain. Three crew were rescued by Surprise. Jane was driven ashore at Dungeness, Kent, where she was wrecked.

== 21 March ==
List of shipwrecks: 21 March 1877
Ship	State	Description
Elizabeth	United Kingdom	The ship was driven ashore near Ouistreham, Calvados, France. She was on a voyage from Caen, Calvados to Burnham Overy Staithe, Norfolk.
Elizabeth	United Kingdom	The ship was driven ashore at Cairnbulg, Aberdeenshire. She was on a voyage from Macduff, Aberdeenshire to Newcastle upon Tyne, Northumberland. She was refloated the next day and taken in to Fraserburgh, Aberdeenshire.
Florence Outton	United Kingdom	The ship was abandoned in the Atlantic Ocean. Her crew took to two boats. Six crew in one of the boats were rescued by Trowbridge (United Kingdom) on 27 March. Those in the other boat were also rescued.
George and Mary	(United Kingdom of Great Britain and Ireland) Jersey	The ship was wrecked on the Fillettes Rocks, off Brest, Finistère, France. She was on a voyage from Saint-Malo, Ille-et-Vilaine to Landerneau, Finistère.
Jessie Foster	United Kingdom	The cutter collided with the dandy Gauntlet (United Kingdom) and sank off The Lizard, Cornwall. Her crew were rescued by the fishing trawler Fawn (United Kingdom).
Ocean Mail	New Zealand	The 1,039-ton clipper was wrecked on a reef off the north coast of the main island of the Chatham Islands. All passengers and crew were safely landed, but the ship became a total wreck.

== 22 March ==
List of shipwrecks: 22 March 1877
Ship	State	Description
Elfrida	Austria-Hungary	The brig ran aground in the River Tweed. She was on a voyage from Alexandria, Egypt to Berwick upon Tweed, Northumberland, United Kingdom. She was later refloated and taken in to Berwick upon Tweed.
John Liddell	United Kingdom	The steamship was driven ashore in the River Thames at the Coalhouse Fort, Essex. She was on a voyage from Sunderland, County Durham to London.
Papa Luigi	Italy	The barque was driven ashore at Nantucket, Massachusetts, United States. She was on a voyage from Agrigento, Sicily to Boston, Massachusetts.
Unnamed	United Kingdom	The barge was damaged by fire in the River Thames at Blackfriars, London.

== 23 March ==
List of shipwrecks: 23 March 1877
Ship	State	Description
Dorothea	United Kingdom	The ship departed from South Shields, County Durham for Danzig, Germany. No further trace, reported missing.
Margaret Wyllie	United Kingdom	The ship was wrecked at "Roccas". Her crew were rescued. She was on a voyage from Paraíba, Brazil to Liverpool, Lancashire.
Wallachia	(United Kingdom of Great Britain and Ireland) Isle of Man	The schooner was driven ashore near Castletown, Isle of Man. She was on a voyage from Liverpool to Castletown. She was refloated the next day.

== 24 March ==
List of shipwrecks: 24 March 1877
Ship	State	Description
Eva	United Kingdom	The barque was driven ashore and wrecked at Baldoyle, County Dublin. Three of her crew were rescued by the Howth Lifeboat Clara Baker ( Royal National Lifeboat Institution). Eva was on a voyage from Dublin to Ardrossan, Ayrshire.
Garibaldi	United Kingdom	The ship was driven ashore at the Coalhouse Fort, Essex. She was on a voyage from Guernsey, Channel Islands to London. She was refloated on 26 March and resumed her voyage.
James Annand	United Kingdom	The ship sprang a leak and foundered off Bengore Head, County Antrim. Her crew survived. She was on a voyage from Irvine, Ayrshire to Portrush, County Antrim.
Oncko	Netherlands	The schooner was wrecked in the Haaks Sandbank, in the North Sea off the Dutch coast. Her crew were rescued. She was on a voyage from Groningen to Gloucester, United Kingdom.
Princess Beatrice	United Kingdom	The ship struck a sunken rock in Loch Oich and was beached. She was on a voyage from Liverpool, Lancashire to Dundee, Forfarshire. She was refloated on 3 April and rescued her voyage.

== 25 March ==
List of shipwrecks: 25 March 1877
Ship	State	Description
Johanna	Germany	The ship was abandoned in the North Sea 25 nautical miles (46 km) north east of Borkum. Her crew were rescued by Jacoba Cornelia (Netherlands). Johanna was on a voyage from Papenburg to Larvik, Norway.

== 26 March ==
List of shipwrecks: 26 March 1877
Ship	State	Description
Florence	United Kingdom	The ship foundered in the North Sea. Her eight crew were rescued by Albert Wilhelm (United Kingdom). Florence was on a voyage from Hull to Christiania, Norway.
Loudon Castle	United Kingdom	The steamship was run into by the steamship Macgregor was run ashore at Shanghai, China.

== 27 March ==
List of shipwrecks: 27 March 1877
Ship	State	Description
Polina	United Kingdom	The schooner sank in the North Sea. Her crew were rescued. She was on a voyage from Newcastle upon Tyne, Northumberland to Randers, Norway.
Santorin	United Kingdom	The steamship was discovered in a sinking condition 170 nautical miles (310 km) south west of The Lizard, Cornwall by the steamship Glenrosa (United Kingdom), which towed her in to Falmouth, Cornwall. Santorin was on a voyage from Cardiff, Glamorgan to Port Said, Egypt.
Shand	United Kingdom	The ship sprang a leak and foundered in the Atlantic Ocean. Her crew were rescued by the steamship Mayaquez (Spain). Shand was on a voyage from New York, United States to London.

== 28 March ==
List of shipwrecks: 28 March 1877
Ship	State	Description
Frank W. Emery	United States	The ship was driven ashore at Pensacola, Florida. She was on a voyage from Havana, Cuba to Pensacola.
Sunshine	Norway	The ship was driven ashore at Hvidovre, Denmark. She was on a voyage from New York, United States to Pillau, Germany. She was refloated the next day and taken in to Rønne, Denmark.

== 29 March ==
List of shipwrecks: 29 March 1877
Ship	State	Description
Antiope	United Kingdom	The ship ran aground on the Bara Quay Flats, off Rangoon, Burma. She was on a voyage from Madras, India to Rangoon. She was later refloated and towed in to Rangoon.
Ariel	Germany	The ship was driven ashore on Rügen. She was on a voyage from Port Madoc, Caernarfonshire to Stettin. She was refloated with assistance from the steamship Sequens (Germany) and taken in to Stettin in a severely leaky condition.
Elizabeth Williams	United Kingdom	The ship ran aground on the Pennington Spit, off the coast of Hampshire. She was on a voyage from Portsmouth, Hampshire to A Coruña, Spain. She was refloated the next day and resumed her voyage.
Emanuel	Norway	The brig foundered in the North Sea 40 nautical miles (74 km) off Tynemouth, Northumberland, United Kingdom. Her crew were rescued by the brig Najaden (Norway). Emanuel was on a voyage from Sunderland, County Durham, United Kingdom to Memel, Germany.
Hjorurgavaag	Norway	The ship departed from Christiania for Ayr, United Kingdom. No further trace, reported missing.
Hollywood	United Kingdom	The barque was abandoned in the Atlantic Ocean. Her crew were rescued by Vaeringer (Norway). Hollywood was on a voyage from the Bull River to a Plymouth, Devon.
Trust	United Kingdom	The ship was driven ashore at Wilmington, Delaware, United States. She was on a voyage from Wilmington to London. She was refloated on 3 April.
Wilhelm Kister	Germany	The ship was driven ashore at Wilmington. She was on a voyage from Wilmington to Hamburg. She was refloated.

== 30 March ==
List of shipwrecks: 30 March 1877
Ship	State	Description
Alkanet	United Kingdom	The ship ran aground at Blakeney, Norfolk. She was on a voyage from London to Blakeney. She was refloated and taken in to Blakeney in a leaky condition.
Cádiz	Spain	The ship was wrecked in the Dry Tortugas. Her crew were rescued. She was on a voyage from Pensacola, Florida, United States to London, United Kingdom.
Cambridgeshire	United Kingdom	The steamship ran aground and was wrecked in the North Sea 5 nautical miles (9.3 km) off the Cuxhaven Lightship (Germany). Her crew were rescued.
Elise	Germany	The abandoned galiot was towed in to Frederikshavn, Denmark.
Lelie	France	The schooner collided with the steamship Wyvern (United Kingdom) and sank in the North Sea. Her crew were rescued by Wyvern. Lelie was on a voyage from Gravelines, Nord to Dysart, Fife, United Kingdom.
Young John	United Kingdom	The ship ran aground at Blakeney. She was on a voyage from Hull, Yorkshire to Blakeney. She was refloated and taken in to Blakeney in a leaky condition.

== 31 March ==
List of shipwrecks: 31 March 1877
Ship	State	Description
Don Colino	(United Kingdom of Great Britain and Ireland) Guernsey	The brigantine was run down and sunk off Cromer, Norfolk by the barque Destino (Italy). Her crew were rescued bu Destino. Don Colino was on a voyage from South Shields, County Durham to Cherbourg, Manche, France.
Gemma	Norway	The barque ran aground in the River Boyne. She was refloated and taken in to Dublin, United Kingdom.
Lyra	United Kingdom	The barque collided with the steamship Dee (United Kingdom) in the Thames Estuary and was severely damaged. Lyra was on a voyage from London to Bangkok, Siam. She put back and was beached at Northfleet, Kent.
Portellas	Spain	The brig was wrecked at Maldonado, Uruguay. She was on a voyage from Barcelona to Montevideo, Uruguay.
Zelie	United Kingdom	The schooner collided with the steamship Wyvern (United Kingdom) and sank. Her crew were rescued. Zelie was on a voyage from Gravelines, Nord, France to Dysart, Fife.

== Unknown date ==
List of shipwrecks: Unknown date in March 1877
Ship	State	Description
Amelia Emma	United States	The brig was lost whilst on a voyage from Baltimore, Maryland, to Santiago, Chile. Her crew were rescued.
Anglia	United Kingdom	The barque caught fire and was abandoned in the North Sea. Her twelve crew were rescued by the smack Alarm (United Kingdom). Anglia was on a voyage from Amsterdam, North Holland, Netherlands to New York, United States.
Arbutus	United Kingdom	The steamship ran aground at Ayr. She was on a voyage from Dublin to Ayr. She was refloated.
Bierstadt	United States	The barque was wrecked at East London, Cape Colony.
Bayonnaise	French Navy	Damage caused to Bayonnaise by a spar torpedo. The Bayonnaise-class corvette was sunk by a spar torpedo fired by Thorneycroft (French Navy) in an experiment before 12 March. She was subsequently broken up.
Busy Bee	United Kingdom	The steamship was driven ashore at Dragør, Denmark. She was refloated and towed in to Copenhagen, Denmark.
Caldera	United Kingdom	The ship ran aground at Berwick upon Tweed, Northumberland. She was refloated on 22 March.
California	United States	The ship was driven ashore at the Margarethe Polder. She was on a voyage from Antwerp, Belgium to Philadelphia, Pennsylvania, United States. She was refloated and towed in to Terneuzen, Zeeland, Netherlands.
Cassandra	United Kingdom	The brig ran around on the Shipwash Sand, in the North Sea off the coast of Suffolk. She was refloated and resumed her voyage.
Champion	Canada	The schooner was abandoned in the Atlantic Ocean before 15 March.
Fortunia	Germany	The steamship was driven ashore at the Darßer Ort. She was refloated and resumed her voyage.
Frank Marion	United Kingdom	The ship was driven ashore at Key West, Florida, United States. She was on a voyage from Cardiff, Glamorgan to New Orleans, Louisiana, United States. She was refloated with assistance.
G. M. Stetson	United Kingdom	The barque sprang a leak and was beached on Lord Howe Island, New South Wales where she was wrecked. Her crew survived. She was on a voyage from Newcastle, New South Wales to San Francisco, California, United States.
Harriet	United Kingdom	The ship ran aground on the Barber Sand, in the North Sea off the coast of Norfolk. She was on a voyage from Goole, Yorkshire to London. She was refloated and taken in to Caister-on-Sea, Norfolk.
Jessie	United Kingdom	The schooner was wrecked on the Goodwin Sands, Kent. Her crew were rescued by a tug and the Ramsgate Lifeboat. She was on a voyage from Plymouth, Devon to Perth.
John W. Webb	United States	The schooner was abandoned in the Atlantic Ocean before 22 March.
Kellisto	United Kingdom	The ship was driven ashore at Beaufort, New Jersey, United States. She was on a voyage from Queenstown, County Cork to New York. She was refloated.
Lady Turner	United Kingdom	The ship was destroyed by fire at sea. Her crew were rescued by the steamship Arratoon Apcar (flag unknown). Lady Turner was on a voyage from Melbourne Victoria to Colombo, Ceylon.
Maud	United Kingdom	The steamship was driven ashore. She was refloated and taken in to Aden, where she arrived on 10 March.
Queen	United Kingdom	The steamship was driven ashore at New Brighton, Cheshire.
Resoluda	Spain	The ship was driven ashore. She was on a voyage from New Orleans to Barcelona. She was refloated and put in to Bermuda in a leaky condition.
San Francisco	Italy	The ship was driven ashore near Monastir, Beylik of Tunis. She was on a voyage from Genoa to Sfax, Beylik of Tunis. She was refloated and resumed her voyage.
Sunshine	United Kingdom	The brigantine was abandoned in the Atlantic Ocean. Her crew were rescued by Hahnemann (Germany). Sunshine was on a voyage from Port Royal, Jamaica to Queenstown.
Tamby	France	The barque was abandoned in the Atlantic Ocean off the coast of the Newfoundland Colony. Her crew were rescued by Behrend (Germany). Tamby Candassamy was on a voyage from Havre de Grâce, Seine-Inférieure to the West Indies.
Thistle	United Kingdom	The steamship was either wrecked on the Foggott Rock, off Seahouses, Northumberland on 12 March, or was wrecked at Newton, Northumberland on 31 March.
Tønsberg	Norway	The barque was driven ashore and wrecked at Cape Lookout, North Carolina, United States with the loss of six lives. She was on a voyage from Liverpool, Lancashire, United Kingdom to Baltimore.
Vidsjaaen	Flag unknown	The ship was driven ashore and wrecked at Darien, Georgia, United States before 3 March. She was on a voyage from Bordeaux, Gironde, France to Darien.
Virtu	Italy	The barque was wrecked at Alexandroupoli, Greece.
Warrior	(United Kingdom of Great Britain and Ireland) Jersey	The schooner was wrecked on the coast of the Newfoundland Colony with the loss of all hands. She was on a voyage from the Newfoundland Colony to Boston, Massachusetts, United States.
Winchester	United Kingdom	The ship was driven ashore at Cape Henry, Virginia, United States. She was on a voyage from Liverpool, Lancashire to the Hampton Roads, Virginia. She was refloated in late March. She was refloated on 30 March and towed in to Norfolk, Virginia.
Unnamed	(Ottoman Empire) Egyptian Navy	The ship was destroyed by fire off Suez before 11 March with the loss of twenty of the 420 people on board. Survivors were rescued by Agra (Flag unknown).
