= Coast Guard Station Cahoon Hollow =

US Coast Guard Station in Nauset, Massachusetts US

Coast Guard Station Cahoons Hollow, Coast Guard Station #38
- Part of USLSS Station #10, 2nd District
- Cahoon Hollow Beach, Wellfleet, Massachusetts
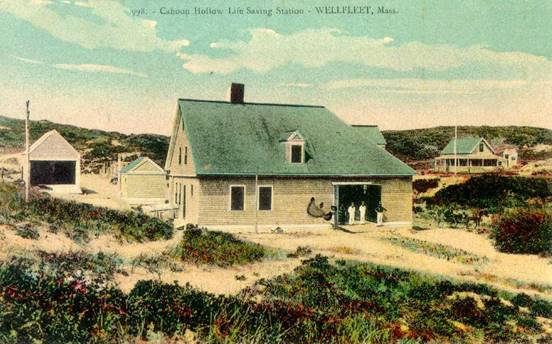
- "Cahoon Hollow Life Saving Station - Wellfleet, Massachusetts"; no date; photographer unknown. Colorized postcard, c. 1900

Site information
- Type: Coast Guard Station
- Owner: The Beachcomber Wellfleet (restaurant)
- Open to the public: Yes

Location
- Coordinates: 41°56′38″N 69°59′6″W

Site history
- Built: 1872–1873; 1888 (rebuilt)
- In use: 1872–1939

United States Coast Guard Station Cahoons Hollow is located on Cahoon Hollow Beach, in Wellfleet, Massachusetts.

== Construction ==
This station was built "east two and a half miles (4.0 km) of Wellfleet, Massachusetts," during the 1872 to 1873 time period. It is located on the "back side" of Cape Cod. The original station was destroyed by fire in February, 1893. The coast at this station was made exceedingly dangerous by sunken rips which stretch out under the sea and extended along the shore for miles.

The station was extensively repaired and improved in 1888. In the 1894 Annual Report is this notation: "...station has been rebuilt to replace the one destroyed by fire on the 25th of February, 1893." The station is not listed subsequent to 1939; the property was abandoned in 1950.

== Keepers ==
The first assigned keeper was William C. Newcombe, who was appointed at the age of 48, with 15 years experience as a sea captain, on December 12, 1872, but he resigned in 1879. He was followed by Daniel Cole, who had been a surfman at the station, and who was appointed keeper on October 25, 1879; he served until he was dismissed because of physical reasons, on May 25, 1905. He was followed by Edward J. Tobin, who was appointed on May 18, 1905, and retired on July 25, 1924. He, in turn, was followed by Chief Petty Officer H. O. Daniels. Jasper B. Myers assumed command on March 3, 1931, having been reassigned from the Coast Guard Station Portsmouth Harbor. He was followed by Chief A. C. Tavers, in 1932, A. E. Newcomb from Coast Guard Station Cuttyhunk, in 1934, and C. R. Ellis from Coast Guard Station Coskata, in 1935.

== See also ==
- List of military installations in Massachusetts

== Bibliography ==
- "Life-Saving Service & Coast Guard Stations Station Cahoons Hollow, Massachusetts".
