= Coast Guard Station Nauset =

US Coast Guard Station in Nauset, Massachusetts US

Coast Guard Station Nauset, Coast Guard Station #39
- Part of USLSS Station #11, 2nd District
- Nauset Beach, Eastham, Massachusetts
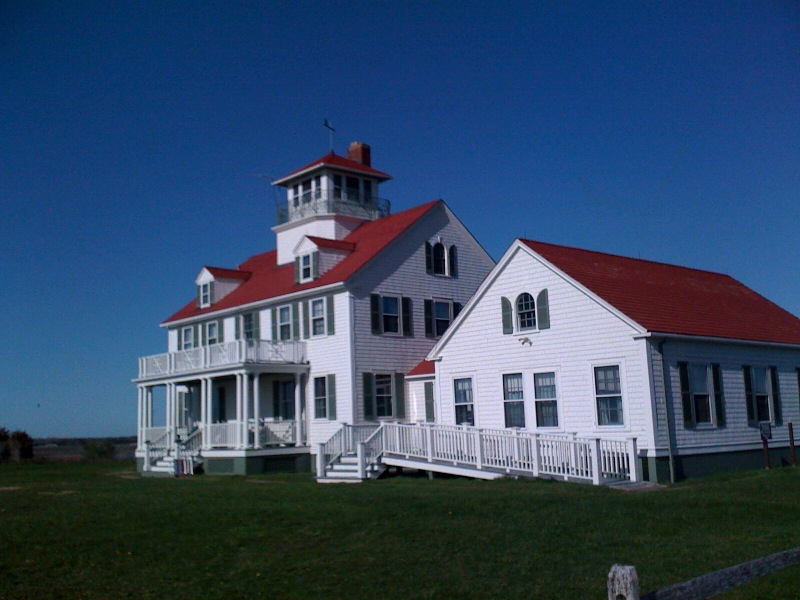
- Former Coast Guard Station, Nauset, Cape Cod National Seashore

Site information
- Type: Coast Guard Station
- Owner: National Park Service
- Open to the public: Yes

Location
- Coordinates: 41°50′36″N 69°56′52″W

Site history
- Built: 1872; 1888 (rebuilt)
- In use: 1872–1948

United States Coast Guard Station Nauset is located on Nauset Beach, in Eastham, Massachusetts.

== Construction ==
Nauset station was built in 1872, "south one and a quarter miles (2.0 km) of Nauset Beach Light." It was one of the original nine life-saving stations which were built on Cape Cod, in that year. Comment is made that "when the station was built, it was placed on a site one thousand feet (300 m) south of its (then) present location, but the shifting sands soon required its being moved inland to a more secure location...the sea at this point is constantly making great inroads into the beach, the banks having been cut away for a distance of about one hundred and fifty feet (46 m) since the station was built." The station was extensively repaired and improved in 1888. Nauset station was still listed as active until it disappears from the list of stations in July 1959.

== Keepers ==
The first keeper was Marcus M. Pierce, who was appointed at the age of 32, on December 12, 1872, and removed on December 17, 1877. Next came Walter 0. Knowles, who was appointed on December 17, 1877, and resigned on September 16, 1887. He was followed by Alonzo N. Bearse, September 12, 1887, until he resigned for physical reasons, on July 21, 1905, Abbott H. Walker, July 15, 1905, until retiring on May 3, 1926, and George B. Nickerson, from the Old Harbor station, on June 11, 1926, he was reassigned to the Old Harbor station, on January 16, 1936. The last keeper shown before World War II, was Chief Petty Officer C. D. Keegan.

== See also ==
- List of military installations in Massachusetts

== Bibliography ==
- "Life-Saving Service & Coast Guard Stations Station Nauset, Massachusetts".
