= Coast Guard Station Key West =

US Coast Guard station in Key West, Florida

Coast Guard Base Key West
- Part of 1st District
- Key West, Florida
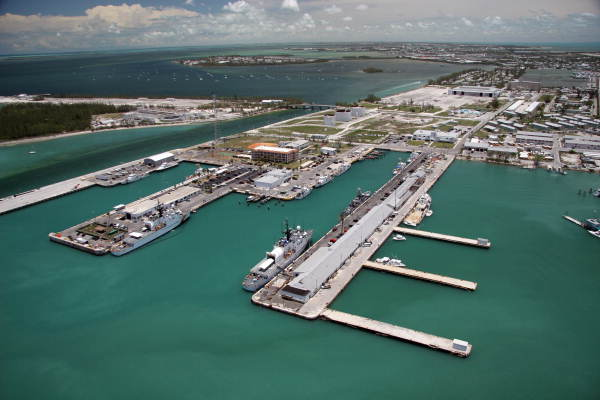

Site information
- Type: Coast Guard Station
- Owner: United States Coast Guard

Location
- Coordinates: 24.5647°N 81.7976°W

Coast Guard Station Key West is the most southerly Coast Guard Station in Florida.

All the cutters in the United States Coast Guard's Sentinel class cutters proceeded to Key West for their acceptance trials, prior to proceeding to their future home ports, for their commissioning. The seventh through twelfth Sentinel cutters, Charles David Jr., Charles W. Sexton, Kathleen Moore, Raymond Evans, William Trump,Isaac Mayo, were homeported in Key West, in 2013, 2014 and 2015.

Those vessels have been active intercepting smugglers and vessels carrying refugees.

== See also ==
- U.S. Coast Guard Headquarters, Key West Station
