= Coast Guard Act =

- Other short titles: An Act to create the Coast Guard by combining therein the existing Life-Saving Service and Revenue-Cutter Service.
- Enacted by: the 63rd United States Congress
- Effective: January 28, 1915

Citations
- Public law: Pub. L. 63–239
- Statutes at Large: 38 Stat. 800

Codification
- Titles amended: 14 U.S.C.: Coast Guard
- U.S.C. sections created: 14 U.S.C. ch. 1 § 1 et seq.

Legislative history
- Introduced in the Senate as S. 2337 by Charles E. Townsend (R-MI) on May 26, 1913; Passed the Senate on March 12, 1914 (Passed); Passed the House on January 20, 1915 (210-79); Signed into law by President Woodrow Wilson on January 28, 1915

The Coast Guard Act of 1915 was passed by Congress on January 20, 1915, and signed into law by then-American president Woodrow Wilson on the twenty-eighth day of the same month. The act created the United States Coast Guard as a new service outwardly modeled on the structure of the U.S. Navy and under the command of the Department of Treasury.

Its men wore uniforms and had the responsibility of protecting American coastal cities and waters from hostile attack, enforcing customs duties and performing search and rescue missions at sea and in coastal environments. The U.S. Coast Guard is a branch of the United States Armed Forces authorized to stop, search and arrest suspected smugglers and other unlawful intruders into American waters.

== Mergers ==
The Coast Guard was created from the merged United States Life-Saving Service and the United States Revenue Cutter Service, which had been established in 1790 to prevent smuggling until the reestablishment of the Navy in 1798.

Although placed under the U.S. Treasury Department the Coast Guard was temporarily transferred to the Navy Department during World War I and again during World War II. In 1939, the Coast Guard also integrated and incorporated the United States Lighthouse Service and, in 1942, the Bureau of Marine Inspection and Navigation. In 1967, the Coast Guard was placed under the United States Department of Transportation.

== Further Amendment ==
Since 2003, the U.S. Coast Guard has fallen under the jurisdiction of the Department of Homeland Security and as before in times of war and emergency when declared by the president, it reverts to the navy's control.
