= Coast Guard Station Michigan City =

US Coast Guard station in Indiana

- Part of 9th District
- Michigan City, Indiana
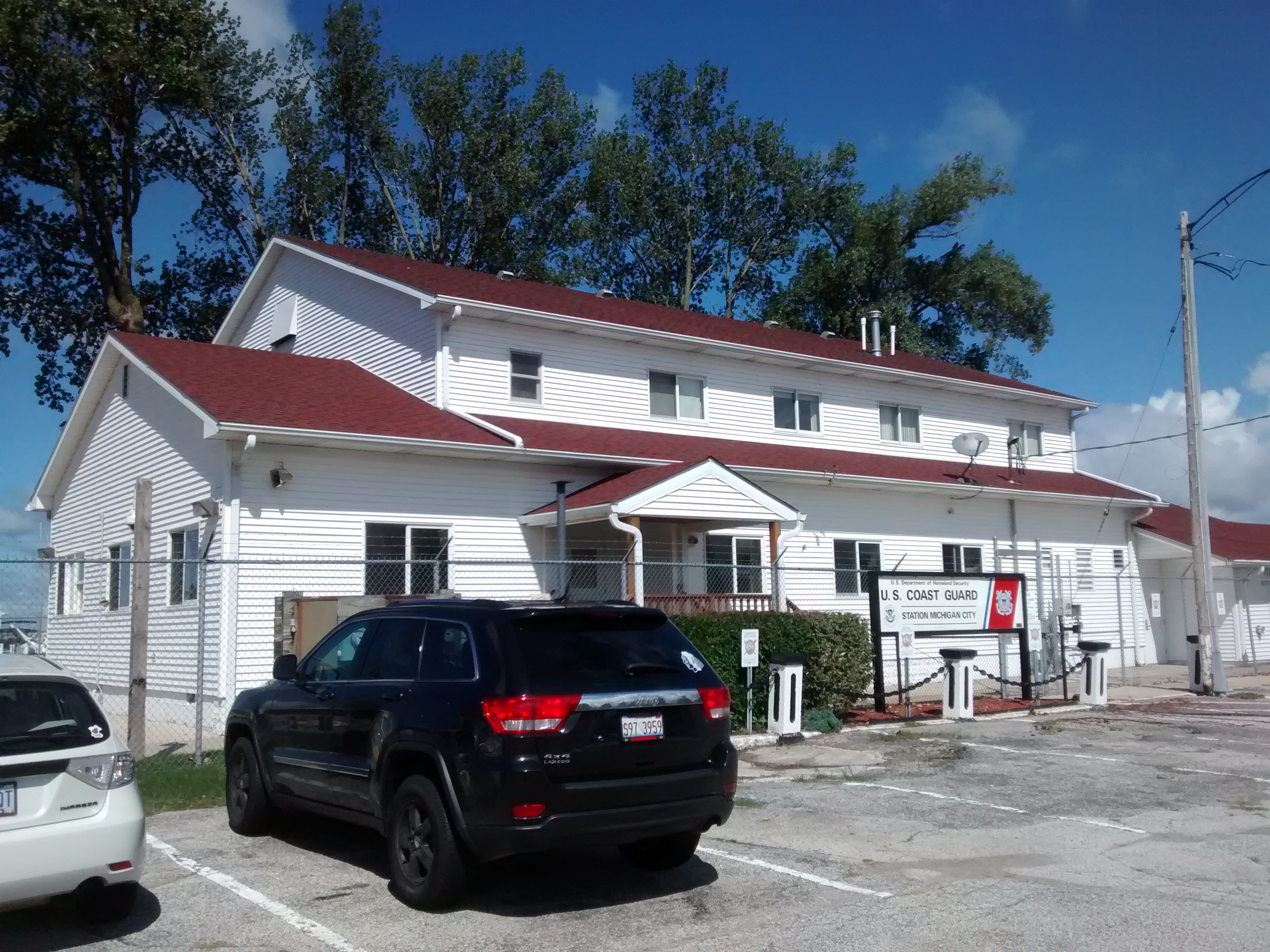

Site information
- Type: Coast Guard Station
- Owner: United States Coast Guard (USCG)
- Condition: Renovated 1988

Location
- Coordinates: 41.7239°N 86.9074°W

Site history
- Built: 1888
- In use: 1888 to Present

Coast Guard Station Michigan City is a United States Coast Guard station located in Michigan City, Indiana. The station is the only Coast Guard Station located on Lake Michigan in Indiana. Station Michigan City is a multi-mission unit that conducts missions in search and rescue, maritime law enforcement, homeland security and marine environmental protection. The station responds to an average of 125 search and rescue cases a year, assisting nearly two million dollars in property.

== Role in Homeland Security ==
Following the terrorist attacks of September 11, 2001, the station took on the important mission known as ports, waterways, and coastal security. The mission includes regular security patrols along the Indiana and Michigan lakeshore to prevent, and protect against potential sabotage by terrorists. The station also conducts many law enforcement boardings to make sure the operator of the boat follows safety guidelines.
