= Coast Guard Base Gloucester =

Decommissioned base in Gloucester, NJ

Coordinates: 39.8986°N 75.1267°W

Coast Guard Base Gloucester is the correct title for the former U.S. Coast Guard COTP Gloucester City, NJ (COTP standing for "Captain of the Port") as well as the now decommissioned U.S. Coast Guard Base Gloucester City, NJ.

The base was formed in 1898 and was closed in 1988, when the Coast Guard moved across the Delaware to Penn's Landing. The base had two tug boats (Coast Guard Cutters Cleat and Catenary), one 41-foot UTB, one oil skimmer, and a 157-foot buoy tender. The site also had the main building that housed administration, berthing for some of the crew, the galley, officers quarters, and the PX. There was a boat house, fire house, Aids To Navigation unit, and a standalone crane for small boats and buoys. All of the above was housed on 10 acres of land and piers.

The 157-foot Red Oak (WLM-689) buoy tender was commissioned on 17 December 1971 and assigned to Gloucester City, New Jersey. It was placed under the operational control of the Third (later the Fifth) Coast Guard District.

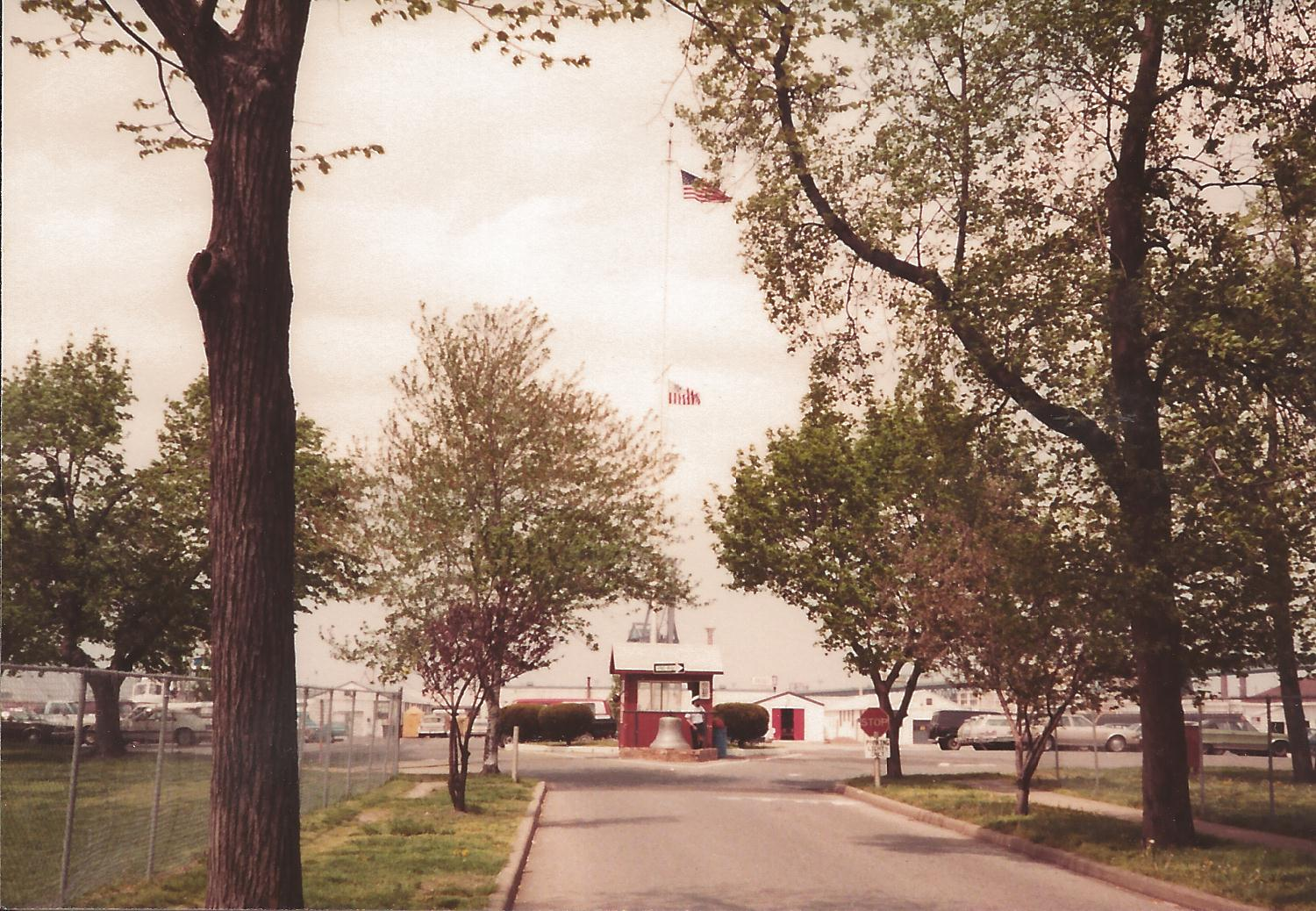
Guard House

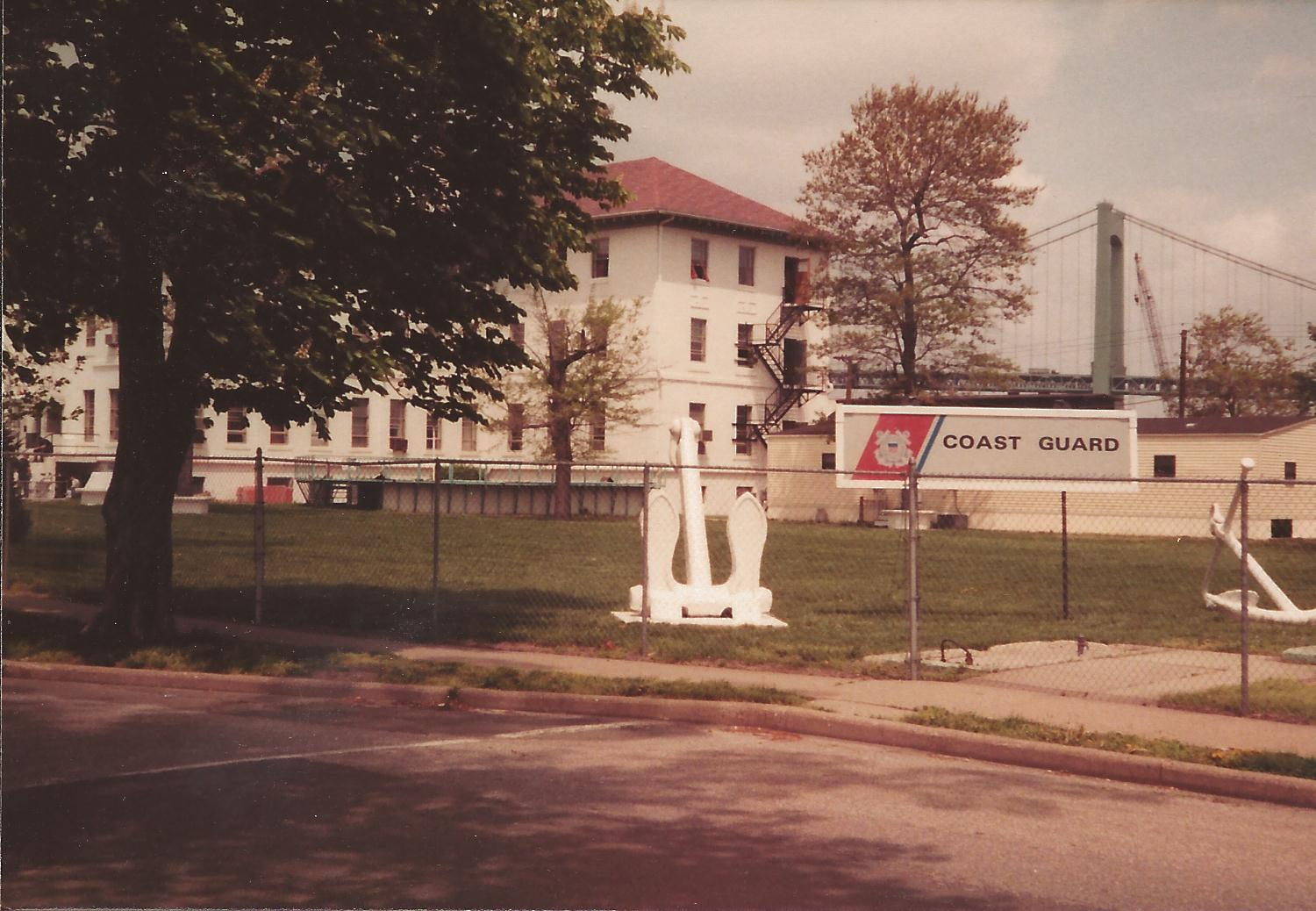
U.S. Coast Guard Base Gloucester City, NJ

Street view of main building, US Coast Guard Base Gloucester City, NJMain Gate for CG Base Gloucester City, NJ
