= ANT Coos Bay =

Coordinates: 43°20′39″N 124°19′30″W

Aids to Navigation Team Coos Bay
- Part of Coast Guard District 13
- Charleston, Oregon
- ANT Coos Bay

Site information
- Type: Aids to Navigation Team
- Controlled by: United States Coast Guard

Site history
- In use: 1976 - present

The United States Coast Guard Aids To Navigation Team, ANT Coos Bay was established in 1976 and is located near the mouth of Coos Bay in the fishing and tourist community of Charleston, Oregon, southwest of the city of Coos Bay. ANT Coos Bay's area of responsibility ranges over 240 miles of the Oregon coast and includes 3 lighthouses, 18 primary buoys, 43 secondary buoys and 156 other lights, day beacons and fog signals.

The assigned crew of seven consists of an Officer In Charge (Chief Boatswain's Mate), Executive Petty Officer (Boatswain's Mate First Class), Engineering Petty Officer (Machinery Technician First Class), Operations Petty Officer (Boatswain's Mate Second Class), one Lighthouse Technician (Electrician's Mate Second Class), one Fireman, and one Seaman.

ANT Coos Bay utilizes a 17 ft utility boat (UTL) and a 26 ft work boat (TANB).
