= Coast Guard Station Toms River =

Former US Coast Guard station in New Jersey

Coordinates: 39.919°N 74.077°W

- Part of 1st District
- Seaside Park, New Jersey
- Toms River Life Saving Station in 1898

Site information
- Type: Coast Guard Station
- Owner: Borough of Seaside Park
- Open to the public: Yes

Site history
- In use: 1856–1966

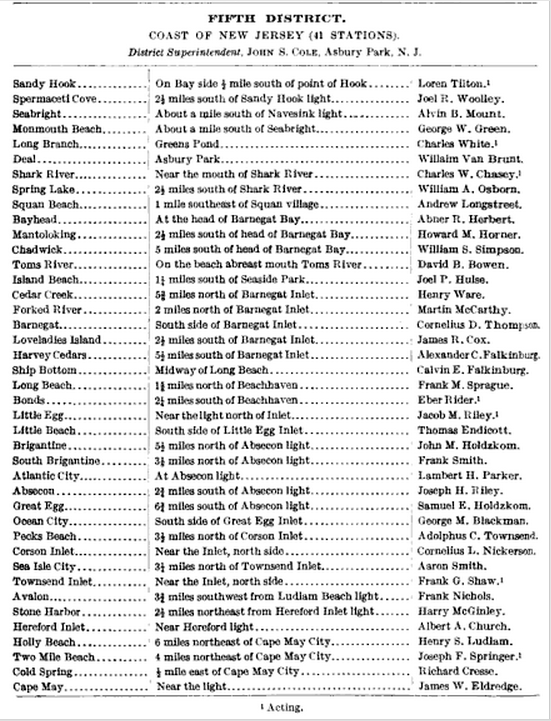
1915 list of New Jersey stations

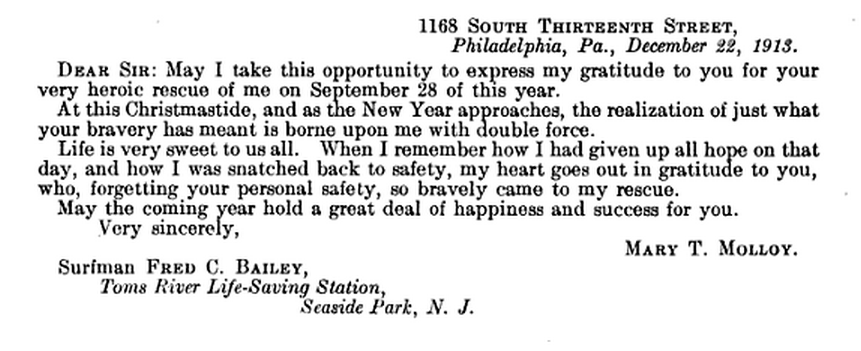
1913 letter describing a rescue

Coast Guard Station Toms River is a former United States Coast Guard station in Seaside Park, New Jersey, at the mouth of the Toms River. The area was manned in 1856 with Samuel Chadwick as the first lifeguard. The first boathouse was constructed in 1872 by the New Jersey Life Saving Service as the Toms River Life Saving Station. Station Toms River was United States Life-Saving Service Station #13 and Coast Guard's Station #109 in the 5th District.

== History ==
The New Jersey Life Saving Service was established on August 9, 1854. Samuel Chadwick was appointed the first lifeguard in 1856. A boathouse for the Toms River Life Saving Station was built in 1872 on Decatur Avenue.

The station was transferred to the United States Life-Saving Service in 1898. Between 1898 and 1900 a new, larger station was built on the same Decatur Avenue site.

On November 30, 1896, the schooner Bertha Warner ran aground and the station saved all but one man. The crew of the station consisted of Elwood Rogers, Pete Newman, Joe Smyers, Jim Applegate, George Everingham and others. In 1906 the SS Carenz ran aground and 38 people were rescued. In 1909 the SS Thurmond ran aground and Henry Ware led the rescue.

In 1915 the United States Life-Saving Service was merged with the United States Revenue Cutter Service to form the United States Coast Guard. The station was turned over to the General Services Administration of the United States government in 1964. The Borough of Seaside Park bought the building in 1966 and in 1996 transformed it into offices for the city clerk, tax collector, and the water and sewer department.

== Timeline ==
- 1854 the New Jersey Life Saving Service was established on August 9, 1854
- 1856 Samuel Chadwick was appointed keeper in 1856 and left on an unknown date.
- 1867 William H. Miller (mariner) was appointed keeper on 13 November 1867 and left around 1875.
- 1876 Stephen Bills was appointed keeper on 10 March 1876 and left in 1879.
- 1879 William H. Miller was appointed keeper on 27 August 1879 and he resigned on 28 November 1893.
- 1893 William Elwood Rogers was appointed keeper on 28 November 1893 and was dismissed on 7 February 1902.
- 1902 Henry Ware was appointed keeper on 17 February 1902 and transferred to Coast Guard Station Cedar Creek on 15 July 1910.
- 1910 David B. Bowen (1874-?) was appointed keeper on 1 July 1910 and he was serving as keeper in 1915.
- 1915 the United States Life-Saving Service merged with the United States Revenue Cutter Service to form the United States Coast Guard.
- 1964 turned over to the General Services Administration

== See also ==
- List of United States Coast Guard stations
