= Cahoon Hollow Beach =

Beach in Wellfleet, Massachusetts, United States

- Beach
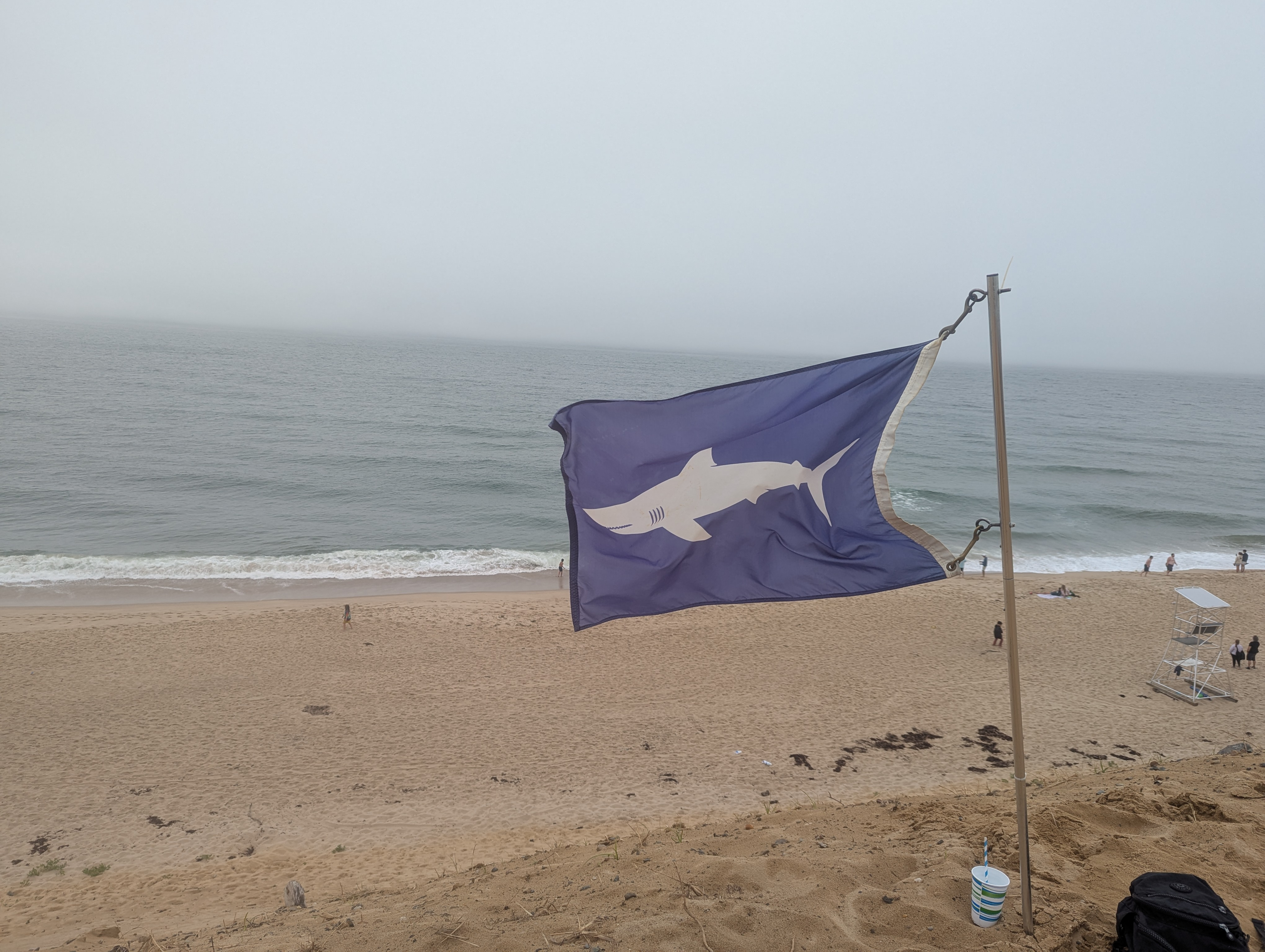
- Shark warning at Cahoon Hollow in 2025

- Location within Massachusetts Location within Cape Cod
- Coordinates: 41.944°N 69.983°W
- Location: Wellfleet, Massachusetts
- Part of: Cape Cod National Seashore

Cahoon Hollow Beach is a beach in the Cape Cod National Seashore in Wellfleet, Massachusetts. It was named for the Cahoon family, who had lived on the Outer Cape for many years.
