= United States Life-Saving Service =

Precursor to the U.S. Coast Guard

- Seal

- Pennant

Agency overview
- Formed: 1878
- Dissolved: 1915 (merged with United States Revenue Cutter Service)
- Superseding agency: United States Coast Guard
- Jurisdiction: Federal government of the United States
- Agency executive: Sumner Increase Kimball (1878–1915), General Superintendent

The United States Life-Saving Service was a United States government agency that grew out of private and local humanitarian efforts to save the lives of shipwrecked mariners and passengers. It began in 1848 and ultimately merged with the Revenue Cutter Service to form the United States Coast Guard in 1915.

== Early years ==
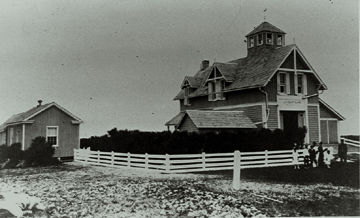
The Cape Hatteras Life-Saving Station. The Station was in use from 1832 until the 1940s. It was demolished by 1949.

The concept of assistance to shipwrecked mariners from shore-based stations began with volunteer lifesaving services, spearheaded by the Massachusetts Humane Society. It was recognized that only small boats stood a chance of assisting those close to the beach. A sailing ship trying to help near to the shore stood a good chance of also running aground, especially if there were heavy onshore winds. The Massachusetts Humane Society founded the first lifeboat station at Cohasset, Massachusetts. The stations were small shed-like structures, holding rescue equipment that was to be used by volunteers in case of a wreck. The stations, however, were only near the approaches to busy ports and, thus, large gaps of coastline remained without lifesaving equipment.

Formal federal government involvement in the lifesaving business began on August 14, 1848, with the signing of the Newell Act, which was named for its chief advocate, New Jersey representative William A. Newell. Under this act, the United States Congress appropriated $10,000 to establish unmanned lifesaving stations along the New Jersey coast south of New York Harbor and to provide "surf boat, rockets, carronades and other necessary apparatus for the better preservation of life and property from shipwreck on the coast of New Jersey". That same year the Massachusetts Humane Society also received funds from Congress for lifesaving stations on the Massachusetts coastline. Between 1848 and 1854 other stations were built and loosely managed. The stations were administered by the United States Revenue Marine (later renamed the United States Revenue Cutter Service). They were run with volunteer crews, much like a volunteer fire department.

In September 1854, a Category 4 hurricane, the Great Carolina Hurricane of 1854, swept through the East Coast of the United States, causing the deaths of many sailors. This storm highlighted the poor condition of the equipment in the lifesaving stations, the poor training of the crews and the need for more stations. Additional funds were appropriated by Congress, including funds to employ a full-time keeper at each station and two superintendents.

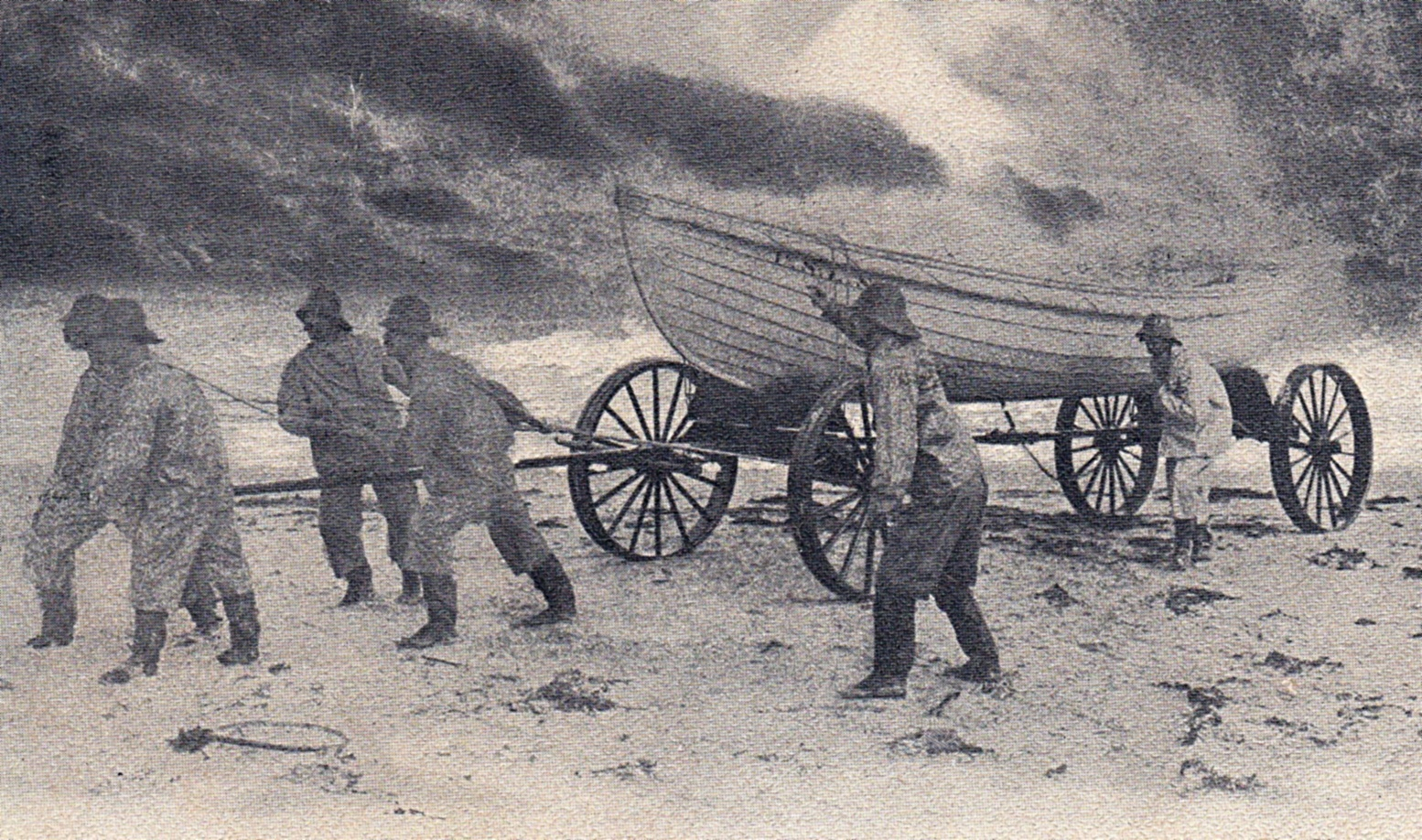
1906 postcard captioned, The start of the life-boat, Cape Cod

Still not officially recognized as a service, the system of stations languished until 1871 when Sumner Increase Kimball was appointed chief of the Treasury Department's Revenue Marine Division. One of his first acts was to send Captain John Faunce of the Revenue Marine Service on an inspection tour of the lifesaving stations. Captain Faunce's report noted that "apparatus was rusty for want of care and some of it ruined."

Kimball convinced Congress to appropriate $200,000 to operate the stations and to allow the Secretary of the Treasury to employ full-time crews for the stations. Kimball instituted six-man boat crews at all stations, built new stations, and drew up regulations with standards of performance for crew members.

The Toms River Life-Saving Station in 1898

By 1874, stations were added along the coast of Maine, Cape Cod, the Outer Banks of North Carolina, and Port Aransas, Texas. The next year, more stations were added to serve the Great Lakes and the Houses of Refuge in Florida. In 1878, the network of lifesaving stations were formally organized as a separate agency of the United States Department of the Treasury, called the Life-Saving Service.

== Formal structure ==
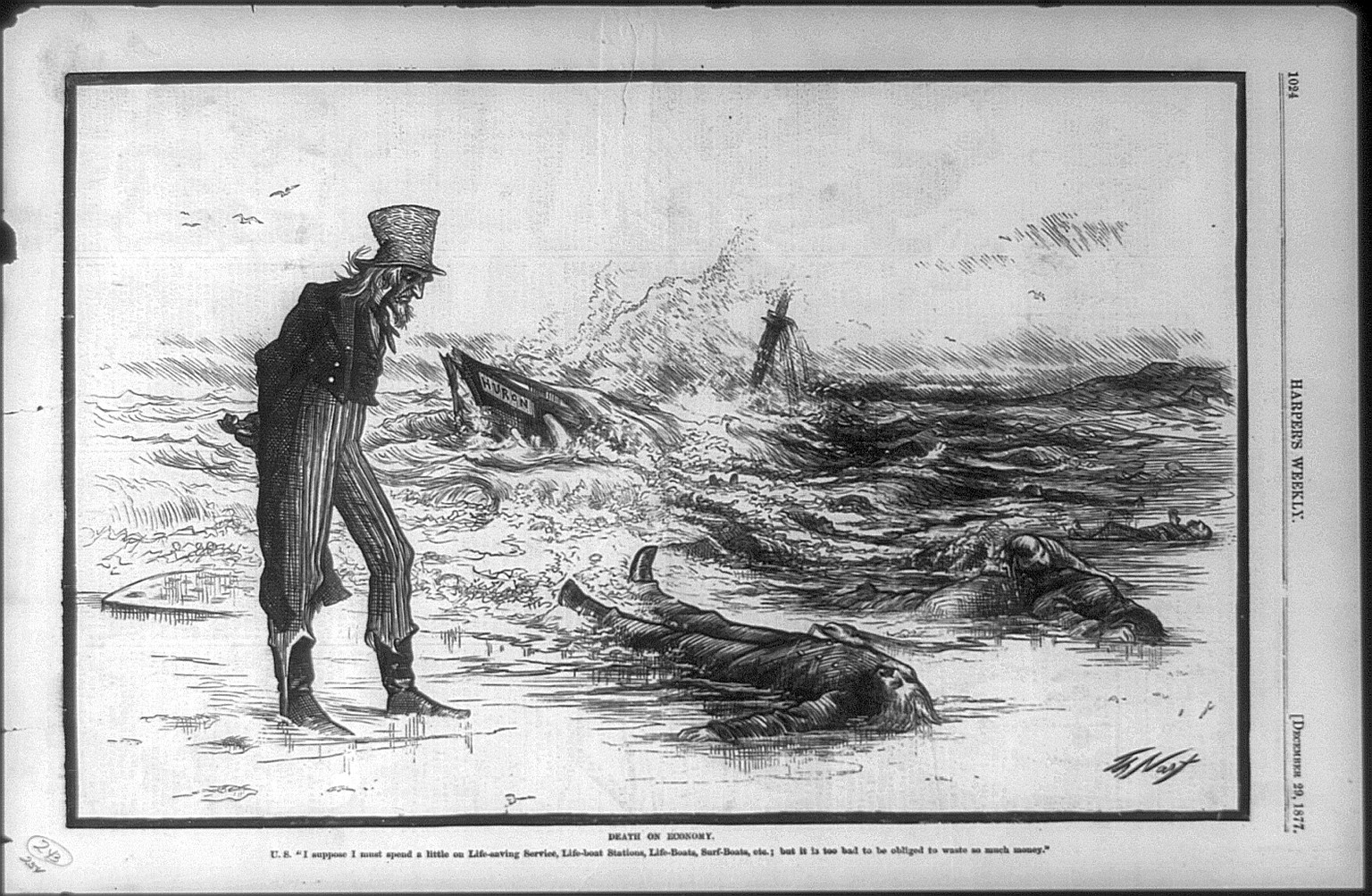
Thomas Nast 1877 political cartoon: Death on economy. U.S. "I suppose I must spend a little on life-saving service, life-boat stations, life-boats, surf-boats, etc.; but it is too bad to be obliged to waste so much money".

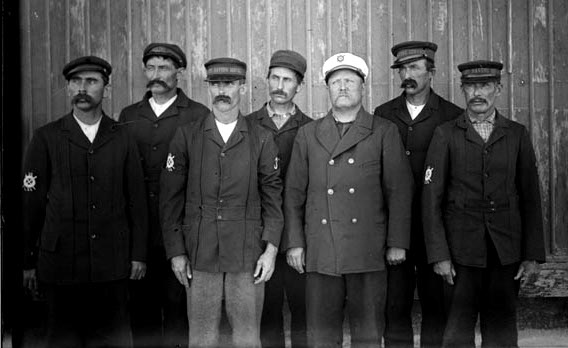
The men of the Kitty Hawk Life-Saving Station, 1900

The stations of the Service fell into three categories: lifesaving, lifeboat, and houses of refuge. Lifesaving stations were manned by full-time crews during the period when wrecks were most likely. On the East Coast, this was usually from April to November, and was called the "active season." By 1900, the active season had now become year-round. Most stations were in isolated areas and crewmen had to perform open beach launchings. That is, they were required to launch their boats from the beach into the surf. The Regulations of Life-Saving Service of 1899, Article VI, "Actions at Wrecks," Section 252, remained in force after creation of the Coast Guard in 1915, and Section 252 was copied word for word into the new Instructions for United States Coast Guard Stations, 1934 edition. That section gave rise to the rescue crew's unofficial motto, "You have to go out, but you don't have to come back."

Before 1900, there were very few recreational boaters and most assistance cases came from ships engaged in commerce. Nearly all lifeboat stations were located at or near port cities. Here, deep water, combined with piers and other waterfront structures, allowed launching heavy lifeboats directly into the water by marine railways on inclined ramps. In general, lifeboat stations were on the Great Lakes, but some lifesaving stations were in the more isolated areas of the lakes. The active season on the Great Lakes stretched from April to December. An exception was the nation's first rescue center on the inland waterways, the United States Life Saving Station #10, established in 1881 at the Falls of the Ohio at Louisville, Kentucky, on the Ohio River.

Houses of refuge made up the third category of Life Saving Service units. These stations were on the coasts of South Carolina, Georgia, and Florida. A paid keeper and a small boat were assigned to each house, but the organization did not include active manning and rescue attempts. It was felt that along this stretch of coastline, shipwrecked sailors would not die of exposure to the cold in the winter as in the north. Therefore, only shelters would be needed.

== United States Volunteer Life Saving Corps ==
The U.S. Volunteer Life-Saving Corps were meant to be a supplement to the U.S. Life-Saving Service. In some areas where there were no stations of the Life-Saving Service or the Humane Society, the USVLSC manned lifeboats and provided services on the coast and on inland waters.

== Merger to create Coast Guard ==
On January 28, 1915, President Woodrow Wilson signed the "Act to Create the Coast Guard," merging the Life-Saving Service with the Revenue Cutter Service to create the United States Coast Guard. By the time the act was signed, there was a network of more than 270 stations covering the Atlantic Ocean, Pacific Ocean, the Gulf of Mexico Coasts, and the Great Lakes.

== See also ==
- Chicamacomico Life-Saving Station
- Dunbar Davis
- Joshua James (lifesaver)
- Lifesaving Medal
- Norwegian Lady Statues
- Pea Island Life-Saving Station
- Seatack, Virginia
- United States Coast Guard History and Heritage Sites
