= Houses of Refuge in Florida =

19th-century life-saving stations

The Biscayne House of Refuge was typical of the houses of refuge in Florida.

The Houses of Refuge in Florida were a series of stations operated by the United States Life Saving Service along the coast of Florida to rescue and shelter ship-wrecked sailors. Five houses were constructed on the east coast in 1876, with five more added in 1885 and 1886. There were also two life-saving stations built, one just south of the Jupiter Inlet, the other on the Gulf coast on Santa Rosa Island near Pensacola, Florida. A house of refuge was planned for the Marquesas Keys, but was never put into commission. The houses were staffed by civilian contractors who lived in the houses with their families. Most of these houses remained in service as life-saving stations until 1915 or later. Some of the locations became United States Coast Guard stations after the Life-Saving Service was merged with the United States Revenue Cutter Service to form the Coast Guard in 1915.

== History ==
Prior to 1871, efforts to save lives from shipwrecks along the United States coast had been largely provided by volunteers. That year the U.S. Congress appropriated funds for the creation of a life saving service, leading to the founding of the United States Life Saving Service in 1878. In the 1870s, the middle and lower east coast of Florida was described as a "howling wilderness" with no means for shipwrecked sailors to find food, fresh water or shelter. Other than lighthouses at Cape Canaveral and Jupiter Inlet, and a few settlers at Lake Worth and Biscayne Bay, the coast south of St. Augustine was uninhabited. The impetus for construction of houses of refuge on the Florida coast came when a ship wrecked between Biscayne Bay and the New River (in present-day Fort Lauderdale) during a hurricane in October 1873. The shipwrecked sailors were unable to salvage any food or water, and did not succeed in attracting the attention of passing ships. When they were found several days later, they were said to be "half-starved and existing on spoiled fish" with only brackish water from a marsh behind the beach for drinking. The resulting publicity in northern newspapers led Sumner Increase Kimball, head of the Revenue Marine Service, to order five houses of refuge constructed along the Florida coast. An Act of Congress in 1874 authorized the construction of five houses of refuge at specified locations on the Florida coast. In 1882, Congress authorized an additional five houses of refuge on the Florida coast.

== Construction and equipment ==
The houses were built of Florida pine, using 8-by-8-inch (200 by 200 mm) heartwood timbers for the foundation and frame, and clapboard siding. They were intended to withstand hurricanes, although at least two of them were destroyed by hurricanes in later years. (Note: The New River (or Fort Lauderdale) and Biscayne houses of refuge were "damaged beyond repair" by the 1926 Miami hurricane.) Each building was surrounded by a roofed veranda. The main floor was divided into four rooms, and a wide porch surrounded three sides of the building. At the north end of the building a kitchen with a fireplace and brick chimney interrupted the veranda. The rest of the main floor was divided into a dining room (next to the kitchen), a living room, and a bedroom. All the stations were alike and all the keepers used the rooms in the same manner. The station keeper's family occupied the main floor. The attic was a dormitory for ship-wrecked sailors, equipped with 20 cots with bedding, dried and salted provisions to feed twenty men for ten days, chests of medicines, and chests of books. Clothing, often heavier than was appropriate for the climate in Florida, was also stored for the use of shipwrecked sailors. A brick cistern collected rain from the roof of the house to supply drinking water. A second building held two life-boats, breeches buoy tackle and flares for signaling. While the houses were equipped with lifesaving equipment, they were intended as passive refuges for sailors who made it to land, and not as active lifesaving stations.

== Operations ==
The keepers of the houses of refuge were civilian contractors. They were expected to have a family living with them, to help with the duties of the station, and to relieve the loneliness of the isolated locations. The regulations for operation of the houses of refuge required the keepers to be resident throughout the year. The keepers were required to keep a daily weather log and record the number of ships passing by the station. Immediately after a storm, the keepers and "such members of their families as are available", were to search the beach for shipwrecks and "persons cast ashore".

== Locations ==
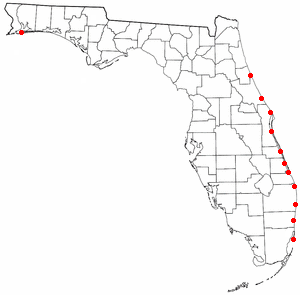
Locations of Houses of Refuge in Florida

The first five houses of refuge, built in 1876, were along the southeastern coast of Florida. Early settlers commonly referred to those houses by their numbers.

- Indian River or Bethel Creek, House of Refuge No. 1 (27°40′00″N 80°21′40″W), was 16 miles (26 km) north of the Indian River Inlet (now known as the Fort Pierce Inlet) in present-day Vero Beach. It was in service from 1876 until 1915, when it became Coast Guard station No. 205. The original house of refuge burned down in 1917, and a new building was constructed. The station was closed in 1929, and the replacement building was torn down in 1936. A 40-foot-tall (12 m) tower was built on the site during World War II to watch for German submarines. The site is now a city park in Vero Beach. (Note: The history of the Indian River/Bethel Creek station is unclear. The official Coast Guard history lists it as the Indian River House of Refuge, established in 1876, and replaced by the Indian River Inlet House of Refuge in 1885. The U.S. Life-Saving Service Heritage Association states that the station established in 1876 was identified as "13 miles north of Indian River Inlet" until 1882, as "Indian River" from 1883 until 1885, and as "Bethel Creek" from 1886 until 1937. The U.S. Life-Saving Service Official Register lists one set of keepers for the Indian River/Bethel Creek House of Refuge from 1880 until after 1909, and a different set of keepers for the Indian River Inlet House of Refuge from 1886 until after 1909.)
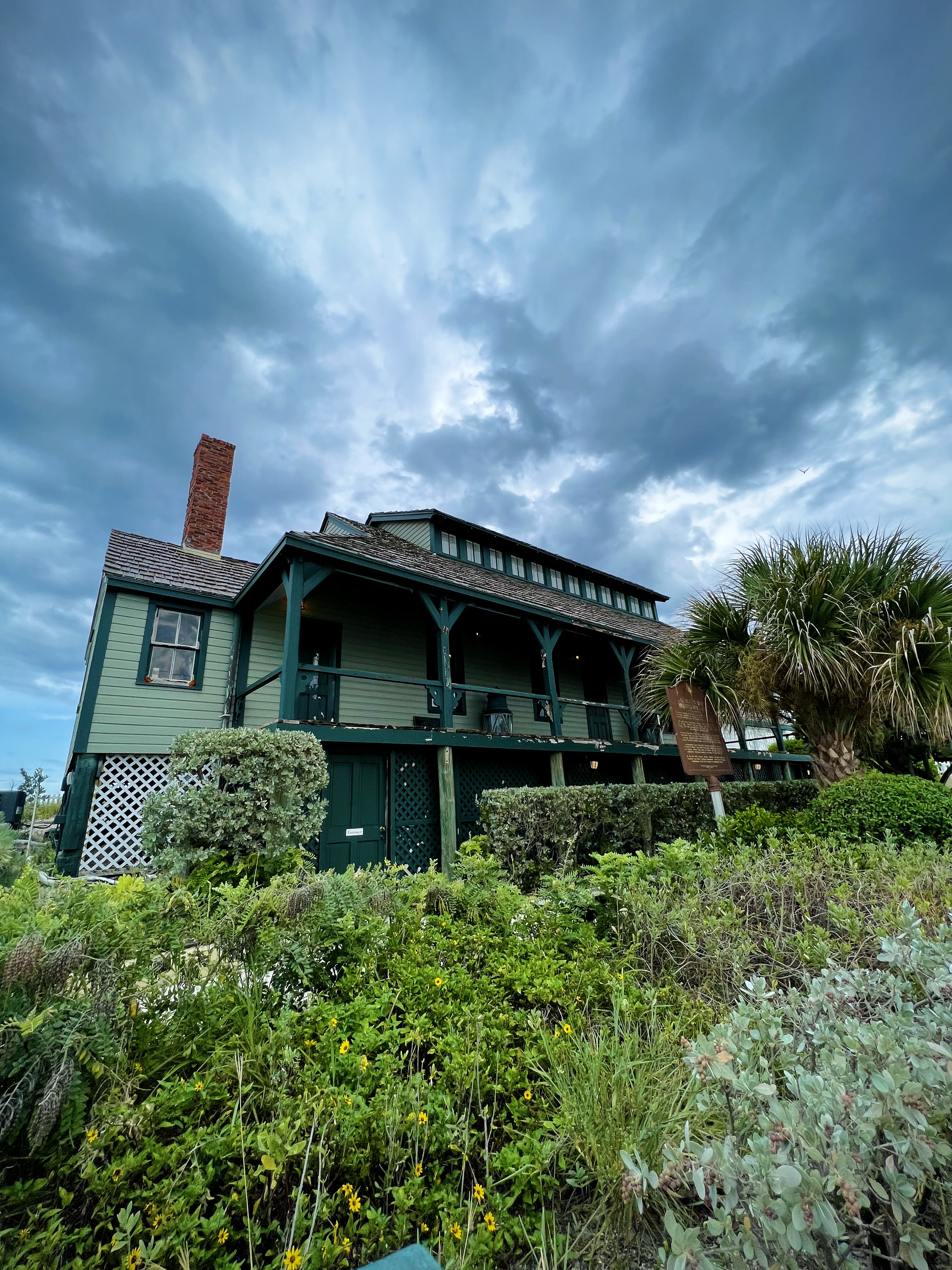
- Built on the southern tip of Hutchison Island in 1876, Gilbert's Bar House of Refuge No. 2 is the last remaining of the refuges commissioned for the U.S. Life-Saving Service.
  Gilbert's Bar House of Refuge No. 2, is at the Saint Lucie Rocks (27°12′00″N 80°09′50″W), 2 miles (3.2 km) north of what is now the St. Lucie Inlet, near Stuart, Florida. It was in service from 1876 until 1915, when it became Coast Guard Station No. 207. It served as a Coast Guard station until 1940, when it was transferred to the United States Navy for use as a beach patrol station until 1945. The Gilbert's Bar House of Refuge is the only original house of refuge still standing in Florida, and is now a museum, operated by the Historical Society of Martin County. It is open to visitors and has various re-enactments and history programs year-round.
- Orange Grove, House of Refuge No. 3 (26°27′30″N 80°03′20″W), was in what is now Delray Beach, Florida. It was in service from 1876 until 1896. The name came from a grove of sour oranges on a beach ridge a couple of miles south of the house. Seminoles hauled canoes over the beach at the grove between the ocean and the navigable head of the Spanish River that ran behind the beach south to the former Boca Raton Inlet. The location was called the Orange Grove Haulover during the Second Seminole War. The first keeper was Hannibal Pierce, father of Charlie W. Pierce. As the settlement that would become Delray Beach began to grow, the House of Refuge was closed, and the government rented the building to settlers. The building was destroyed by fire in 1927.
- Fort Lauderdale, House of Refuge No. 4 (26°08′00″N 80°06′00″W), was 7 miles (11 km) north of the old (now closed) New River Inlet in what is now Fort Lauderdale, Florida. It was in service from 1876 until 1915, when it became Coast Guard Station No. 208. In February, 1926, Coast Guard station No. 6 was transferred from Miami to the site of the Fort Lauderdale House of Refuge. The old house of refuge building was destroyed by the Great Miami Hurricane in October, 1926.

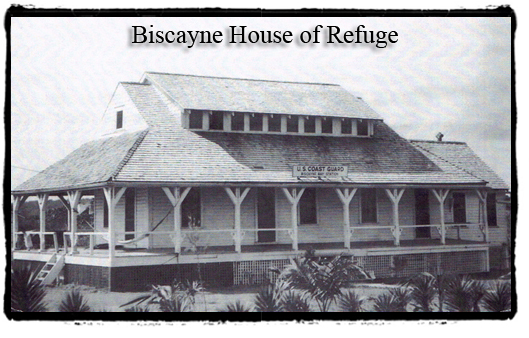
The Biscayne House of Refuge between 1915, when it became a United States Coast Guard station, and 1926, when it was badly damaged in the Great Miami Hurricane. The dormer was probably added after 1915. The original attic only had windows at the gable ends.

- Biscayne, House of Refuge No. 5 (25°54′10″N 80°08′00″W), was at what is now 72nd Street on Miami Beach, Florida. It was in service from 1876 until 1915, when it became Coast Guard Station No. 209. The building was damaged beyond repair by the 1926 Miami hurricane, and the property was transferred to the City of Miami in exchange for property on the County Causeway, the current location of U.S. Coast Guard Station Miami Beach.

A further five houses of refuge were built in Florida in 1885 and 1886, along the middle part of the east coast, primarily to the north of the existing houses of refuge.

- Smith's Creek (1886–1902) or Bulow (1903–1929) (29°26′10″N 81°06′25″W) was 20 miles (32 km) south of Matanzas Inlet. It was in service from 1886 until 1915, when it became Coast Guard station No. 202. The station was closed in 1918, re-opened in 1924, renamed Flagler Beach in 1930, and closed in 1940.
- Mosquito Lagoon (28°51′30″N 80°46′20″W) was east of the Mosquito Lagoon. It was in service from 1886 until 1915, when it became Coast Guard Station No. 203. The Coast Guard station was closed in 1938.
- Chester Shoal (28°36′40″N 80°35′50″W) was 11 miles (18 km) north of Cape Canaveral. It was in service from 1886 until 1915, when it became Coast Guard Station No. 204, and remained in service until 1940.
- Cape Malabar (28°03′10″N 80°32′45″W) was 30 miles (48 km) south of Cape Canaveral. It was in service from 1886 until 1891.
- Indian River Inlet (27°29′45″N 80°17′50″W) was originally on the south side of the old Indian River Inlet, which closed in the 1890s. The former site of the station is approximately 2.2 miles (3.5 km) north of today's Fort Pierce Inlet at Peppers Park, St. Lucie County). It was in service from 1885 until 1915, when it became Coast Guard Station No. 206. The station closed in 1937.

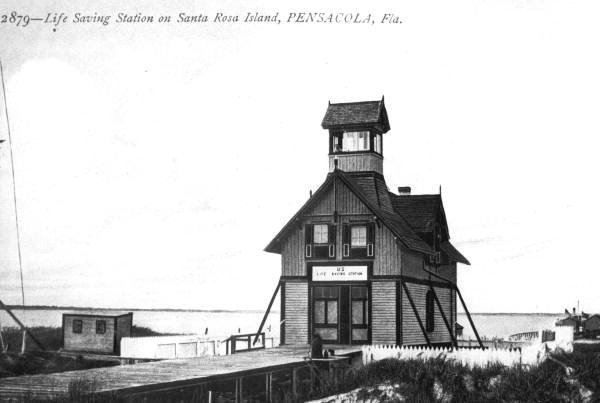
The Santa Rosa Life-Saving Station in 1906

Two life-saving stations were placed in Florida. These stations had a keeper present year-round, but, unlike houses of refuge, a crew of surfmen to man a lifeboat was present during the active season.

- The Jupiter Inlet Life-Saving Station (26°55′40″N 80°04′00″W) was on the south side of the Jupiter Inlet, across from the Jupiter Inlet Lighthouse. This station was in service from 1886 until 1896. A keeper was present year-round, with a crew of six surfmen present during the winter.
- The Santa Rosa Life-Saving Station (30°19′00″N 87°15′30″W) was on Santa Rosa Island close to Fort Pickens and the Pensacola Light. This station was in service from 1885 until 1915, when it became Coast Guard Station No. 212. The station remained in service until 1986. The life-saving station building was destroyed by a hurricane in 1906, and rebuilt in 1907. As of 2012, the rebuilt building is used as a ranger station in Gulf Islands National Seashore.

The Life-Saving Service acquired a site in the Marquesas Keys for a station in 1884, but did not open a station there.
