= U.S. Coast Guard Northeast District =

United States Coast Guard district

Department of Homeland Security United States Coast Guard
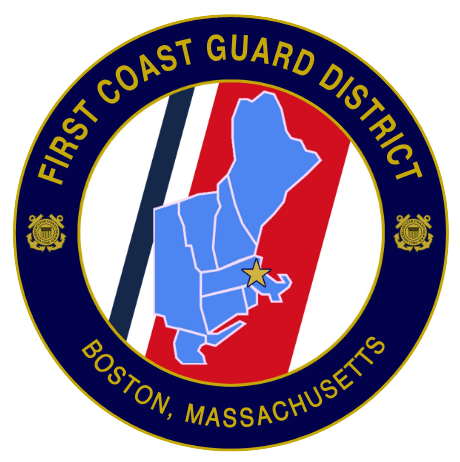
- United States Coast Guard Northeast District Icon
- Country: United States of America
- Branch: Coast Guard
- Part of: Atlantic Area
- Garrison/HQ: Boston, Massachusetts
- Mottos: Semper Paratus (Always Ready)
- Website: atlanticarea.uscg.mil

Commanders
- District Commander: RADM Michael E. Platt
- Chief of Staff: CAPT Lexia M. Littlejohn
- Command Master Chief: MCPO Robert Riemer
- Reserve Command Master Chief: MCPO Wayne E. Davis, USCGR
- District Chaplain: LCDR James C. Ragain, CHC, USN

U.S. Coast Guard Northeast District is a United States Coast Guard district, based in Boston, Massachusetts. The Northeast District is responsible for all Coast Guard operations in the Northeastern United States encompassing the entire states of Connecticut, Maine, Massachusetts, New Hampshire, Rhode Island, and Vermont, with parts of New Jersey and New York. RADM Michael E. Platt has led the district 1 since May 2024.

== Sectors ==
Northeast District is divided into 5 sectors, each with their own sector commander.

=== Sector Boston ===
Sector Boston is based in Boston, Massachusetts and motto is "The Birthplace of the Coast Guard".

- Sector Commander: CAPT Jamie C. Frederick
- Deputy Sector Commander: CDR James J. Schock
- Command Senior Chief: SCPO Scott M. Dupre

=== Sector New York ===
Sector New York is based in Staten Island, New York.

- Sector Commander: CAPT Jonathan Andrechik
- Deputy Sector Commander: CAPT Doreen McCarthy
- Command Master Chief: MCPO Daniel Phillips

=== Sector Northern New England ===
Sector Northern New England is based in South Portland, Maine.

- Sector Commander: CAPT Matthew S. Baker
- Deputy Sector Commander: CDR Megan L. Drewniak
- Command Master Chief: MCPO Trevor Hughes

=== Sector Long Island Sound ===
Sector Long Island Sound is based in New Haven, Connecticut.

- Sector Commander: CAPT Elisa M. Garrity
- Deputy Sector Commander: CDR Josh W. Buck
- Command Senior Chief: SCPO Lee Nelson

=== Sector Southeastern New England ===
Sector Southeastern New England is based in Woods Hole, Massachusetts.

- Sector Commander: CAPT Clinton J. Prindle
- Deputy Sector Commander: CDR John M. Singletary
- Command Master Chief: MCPO Anthony M. Martinez

== Air Station Cape Cod ==
District 1 has a singular air station, Coast Guard Air Station Cape Cod, located at Joint Base Cape Cod. The current air station leadership is:

- Commanding Officer: CAPT Michael Lachowicz
- Executive Officer: CDR Jake S. London
- Command Master Chief: MCPO Ronald Freitas

== Cutters ==
Northeast District is in direct command of a variety of cutters

Four are Keeper-class cutters:

- USCGC Abbie Burgess
- USCGC Katherine Walker
- USCGC Marcus Hanna
- USCGC Ida Lewis

Two are Juniper-class cutters:

- USCGC Oak
- USCGC Sycamore

Six are Sentinel-class cutters:

- USCGC William Chadwick (WPC-1150)
- USCGC Warren Deyampert (WPC-1151)
- USCGC Maurice Jester (WPC-1152)
- USCGC John Patterson (WPC-1153)
- USCGC William Sparling (WPC-1154)
- USCGC Melvin Bell (WPC-1155)

== List of Northeast District units by sector ==
| Sector | Sector Logo | Unit | Location |
|---|---|---|---|
| Boston | | Station Boston | Boston, Massachusetts |
| Boston | | Station Gloucester | Gloucester, Massachusetts |
| Boston | | Station Merrimack River | Newburyport, Massachusetts |
| Boston | | Station Point Allerton | Hull, Massachusetts |
| Boston | | Aids to Navigation Team | Boston, Massachusetts |
| Boston | | USCGC Marlin | Boston, Massachusetts |
| Boston | | USCGC Key Largo | Gloucester, Massachusetts |
| Boston | | USCGC Pendant | Boston, Massachusetts |
| New York | | Station New York | Staten Island, New York |
| New York | | Station Kings Point | Kings Point, New York |
| New York | | Station Sandy Hook | Highlands, New Jersey |
| New York | | Aids to Navigation Team New York | Bayonne, New Jersey |
| New York | | Aids to Navigation Team Saugerties | Saugerties, New York |
| New York | | USCGC Sailfish | Bayonne, New Jersey |
| New York | | USCGC Sturgeon Bay | Bayonne, New Jersey |
| New York | | USCGC Penobscot Bay | Bayonne, New Jersey |
| New York | | USCGC Line | Bayonne, New Jersey |
| New York | | USCGC Hawser | Bayonne, New Jersey |
| New York | | USCGC Wire | Bayonne, New Jersey |
| Northern New England | | Station Portsmouth Harbor | New Castle, New Hampshire |
| Northern New England | | Station Burlington | Burlington, Vermont |
| Northern New England | | Station Boothbay Harbor | Boothbay Harbor, Maine |
| Northern New England | | Station South Portland | South Portland, Maine |
| Northern New England | | Station Jonesport | Jonesport, Maine |
| Northern New England | | Station Rockland | Rockland, Maine |
| Northern New England | | Station Eastport | Eastport, Maine |
| Northern New England | | Marine Safety Detachment Belfast | Belfast, Maine |
| Northern New England | | Marine Safety Detachment Portsmouth | New Castle, New Hampshire |
| Northern New England | | Aids to Navigation Team South Portland | South Portland, Maine |
| Northern New England | | Aids to Navigation Team Southwest Harbor | Southwest Harbor, Maine |
| Northern New England | | Aids to Navigation Team Burlington | Burlington, Vermont |
| Northern New England | | Sector Field Office Southwest Harbor | Southwest Harbor, Maine |
| Northern New England | | USCGC Sitkinak | South Portland, Maine |
| Northern New England | | USCGC Finback | Jonesport, Maine |
| Northern New England | | USCGC Tackle | Rockland, Maine |
| Northern New England | | USCGC Shackle | South Portland, Maine |
| Northern New England | | USCGC Bridle | Southwest Harbor, Maine |
| Northern New England | | USCGC Thunder Bay | Rockland, Maine |
| Long Island Sound | | Station Shinnecock | Hampton Bays, New York |
| Long Island Sound | | Station Eatons Neck | Northport, New York |
| Long Island Sound | | Station Fire Island | Babylon, New York |
| Long Island Sound | | Station Jones Beach | Freeport, New York |
| Long Island Sound | | Station Montauk | Montauk, New York |
| Long Island Sound | | Station New Haven | New Haven, Connecticut |
| Long Island Sound | | Station New London | New London, Connecticut |
| Long Island Sound | | Aids to Navigation Team Long Island Sound | New Haven, Connecticut |
| Long Island Sound | | Aids to Navigation Team Moriches | Hampton Bays, New York |
| Long Island Sound | | Marine Safety Detachment Coram | Coram, New York |
| Long Island Sound | | Sector Field Office Moriches | Moriches, New York |
| Long Island Sound | | USCGC Bollard | New Haven, Connecticut |
| Long Island Sound | | USCGC Coho | New London, Connecticut |
| Long Island Sound | | USCGC Kingfisher | Montauk, New York |
| Southeastern New England | | Detachment Rhode Island | East Providence, Rhode Island |
| Southeastern New England | | Station Woods Hole | Woods Hole, Massachusetts |
| Southeastern New England | | Station Chatham | Chatham, Massachusetts |
| Southeastern New England | | Station Provincetown | Provincetown, Massachusetts |
| Southeastern New England | | Station Cape Cod | Joint Base Cape Cod |
| Southeastern New England | | Station Menemsha | Chilmark, Massachusetts |
| Southeastern New England | | Station Castle Hill | Newport, Rhode Island |
| Southeastern New England | | Station Point Judith | Narragansett, Rhode Island |
| Southeastern New England | | Station Brant Point | Nantucket |
| Southeastern New England | | Marine Safety Unit New Bedford | New Bedford, Massachusetts |
| Southeastern New England | | Marine Safety Unit Cape Cod | Buzzards Bay, Massachusetts |
| Southeastern New England | | Aids to Navigation Team Bristol | Bristol, Rhode Island |
| Southeastern New England | | Aids to Navigation Team Woods Hole | Woods Hole, Massachusetts |
| Southeastern New England | | USCGC Tybee | Woods Hole, Massachusetts |
| Southeastern New England | | USCGC Steelhead | Newport, Rhode Island |
| Southeastern New England | | USCGC Sanibel | Woods Hole, Massachusetts |
| Southeastern New England | | USCGC Cobia | Woods Hole, Massachusetts |

== List of Northeast District Auxiliary Units ==
| AUX-District | District Seal | Divisions | Location |
|---|---|---|---|
| CG AUX Northeast District North | | Northern Maine #01 | North Eastern Maine |
| CG AUX Northeast District North | | Southern Maine #02 | Southern Maine |
| CG AUX Northeast District North | | Merrimack Valley #03 | New Hampshire |
| CG AUX Northeast District North | | Mass. North Shore #04 | Essex County, Massachusetts |
| CG AUX Northeast District North | | Boston #05 | Boston, Massachusetts |
| CG AUX Northeast District North | | Buzzards Bay #06 | Southeastern Massachusetts |
| CG AUX Northeast District North | | Narragansett Bay #07 | Rhode Island |
| CG AUX Northeast District North | | Western Massachusetts #09 | Western Massachusetts |
| CG AUX Northeast District North | | Central Massachusetts #10 | Central Massachusetts |
| CG AUX Northeast District North | | Cape Cod #11 | Cape Cod, Massachusetts |
| CG AUX Northeast District North | | Mass. South Shore #12 | Norfolk and Plymouth County, Massachusetts |
| CG AUX Northeast District South | | Central Long Island #01 | Great South Bay, New York |
| CG AUX Northeast District South | | Sandy Hook #02 | Sandy Hook, New Jersey |
| CG AUX Northeast District South | | Raritan #04 | Union County, New Jersey |
| CG AUX Northeast District South | | New York City #05 | Manhattan, New York |
| CG AUX Northeast District South | | Hudson River East #06 | Eastern Hudson River Valley, New York |
| CG AUX Northeast District South | | Western Connecticut #07 | Fairfield County, Connecticut |
| CG AUX Northeast District South | | Lower Hudson #10 | Newburgh, New York through Newark, New Jersey |
| CG AUX Northeast District South | | Rockaway Inlet #11 | Brooklyn, New York |
| CG AUX Northeast District South | | North Shore Long Island #12 | East River, New York |
| CG AUX Northeast District South | | South Shore Long Island #13 | Jones Beach, New York |
| CG AUX Northeast District South | | Staten Island #14 | Staten Island, New York |
| CG AUX Northeast District South | | Upper Hudson #15 | Hudson River Valley to Lake Champlain and Vermont |
| CG AUX Northeast District South | | Eastern Long Island #18 | Peconic Bay, New York |
| CG AUX Northeast District South | | Eastern Neck #22 | Northern Suffolk County, New York |
| CG AUX Northeast District South | | South Central Connecticut #24 | New Haven, Connecticut |
| CG AUX Northeast District South | | New London #25 | New London, Connecticut |

== See also ==
United States Coast Guard sector
