= 14th Weapons Squadron =

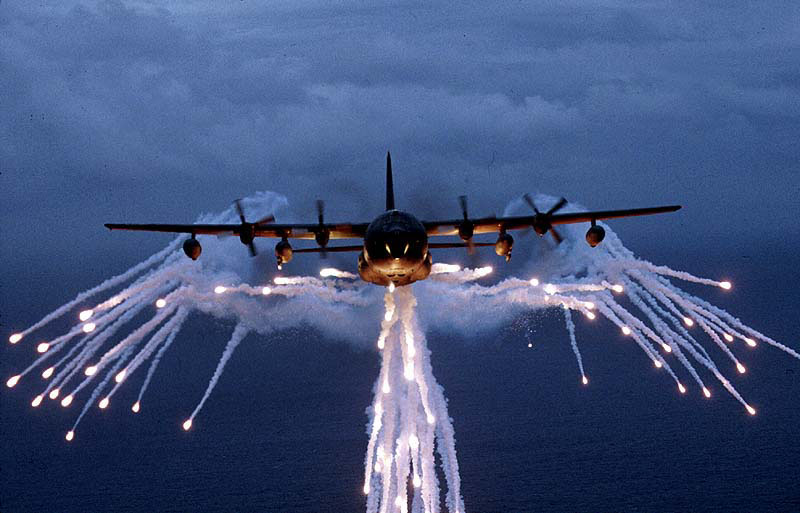
- 14th Weapons Squadron Lockheed MC-130 using flares
- Active: 1942-1949; 1967–1968; 2003–present
- Country: United States
- Branch: United States Air Force
- Type: Squadron
- Role: Advanced Special Operations Training
- Part of: Air Combat Command
- Garrison/HQ: Hurlburt Field, Florida
- Nickname: Puff the Magic Dragon (1967–1968) Air Commandos (2003–present)
- Engagements: Vietnam War

- Decorations: Air Force Outstanding Unit Award with Combat "V" Device Republic of Vietnam Gallantry Cross with Palm

Insignia
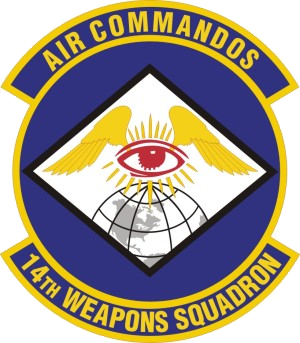
- 14th Weapons Squadron emblem (approved 5 September 1942)

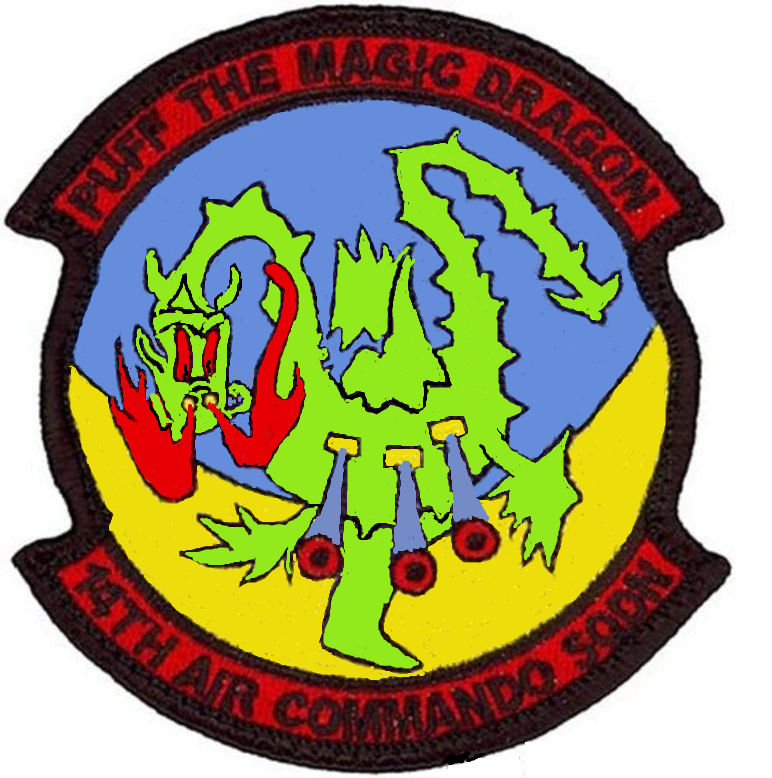
- Patch with 14th Air Commando Sq emblem

The 14th Weapons Squadron is a United States Air Force unit. It is assigned to the USAF Weapons School, stationed at Hurlburt Field, Florida.

The squadron is a geographically separated unit of the 57th Wing at Nellis Air Force Base, Nevada. The mission of the squadron is to produce weapons officers for the special operations community by providing graduate level instructional flying on Air Force Special Operations Command aircraft through weapons instructor courses. Currently, the squadron produces special operations force weapons officers specializing in Lockheed AC-130, Lockheed MC-130 and Pilatus U-28 aircraft.

The unit traces its lineage back to the 14th Observation Squadron and participated in the landings at Normandy in June 1944. Later, during the Vietnam era, the 14th Air Commando Squadron, flew Douglas AC-47 Spooky gunships between 1967 and 1968. The 14th flew out of Nha Trang Air Base, Phan Rang Air Base, Bien Hoa Air Base, and Binh Thuy Air Base, providing fire support in defense of US air bases, special forces camps, Republic of Vietnam Army outposts, and South Vietnamese hamlets. Decorations of this combat unit include the Republic of Vietnam Gallantry Cross with Palm, and the Air Force Outstanding Unit Award with Combat "V" Device.

These two units were consolidated in 1985.

== History ==
=== World War II ===
Activated in 1942 as a liaison and observation squadron, supported US Army maneuvers by flying photo and tactical observation missions, spotting artillery fire, 1942 until early 1944.

Deployed to Europe in early 1944, providing courier service, observation, mail and other liaison services in support of the US Army advance through France and Germany, Jul 1944-May 1945; dropped medical supplies, food, and ammunition to an Army battalion stranded on the Moselle River, Nov 1944; supported the Third Army during the Battle of the Bulge, Dec 1944-Jan 1945; added medical evacuation to its tasks in Apr 1945.

Supported US occupying forces in Germany, May-Sep 1945.

=== Vietnam War ===
Combat in Vietnam, Jan-May 1968, with the 14th Air Commando Wing. The squadron provided aerial fire support in defense of USAF forces, including bases, camps, outposts, and hamlets in the southern half of country.

=== Advanced special operations training ===
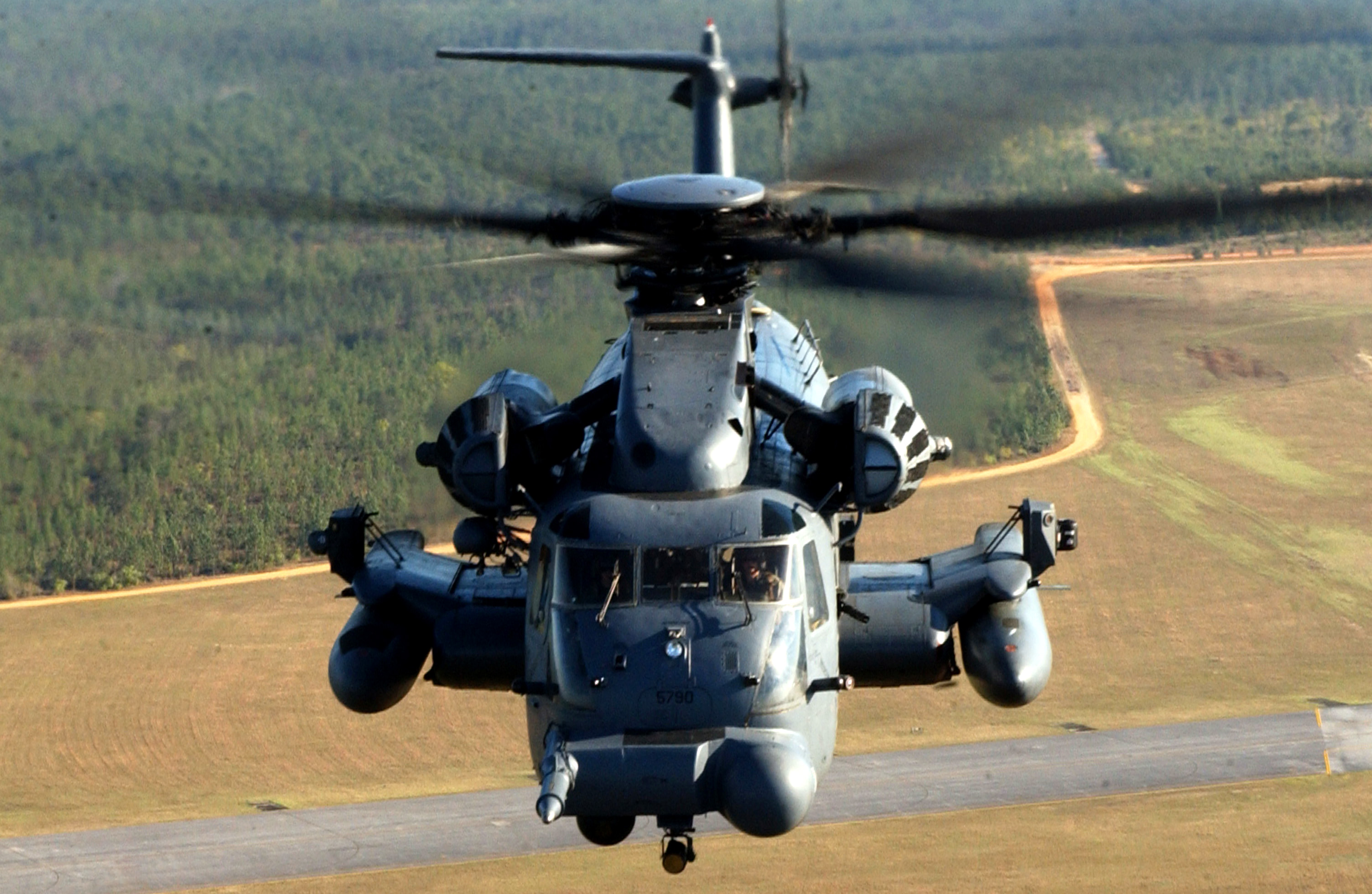
An MH-53 Pave Low helicopter at Hurlburt Field, Florida

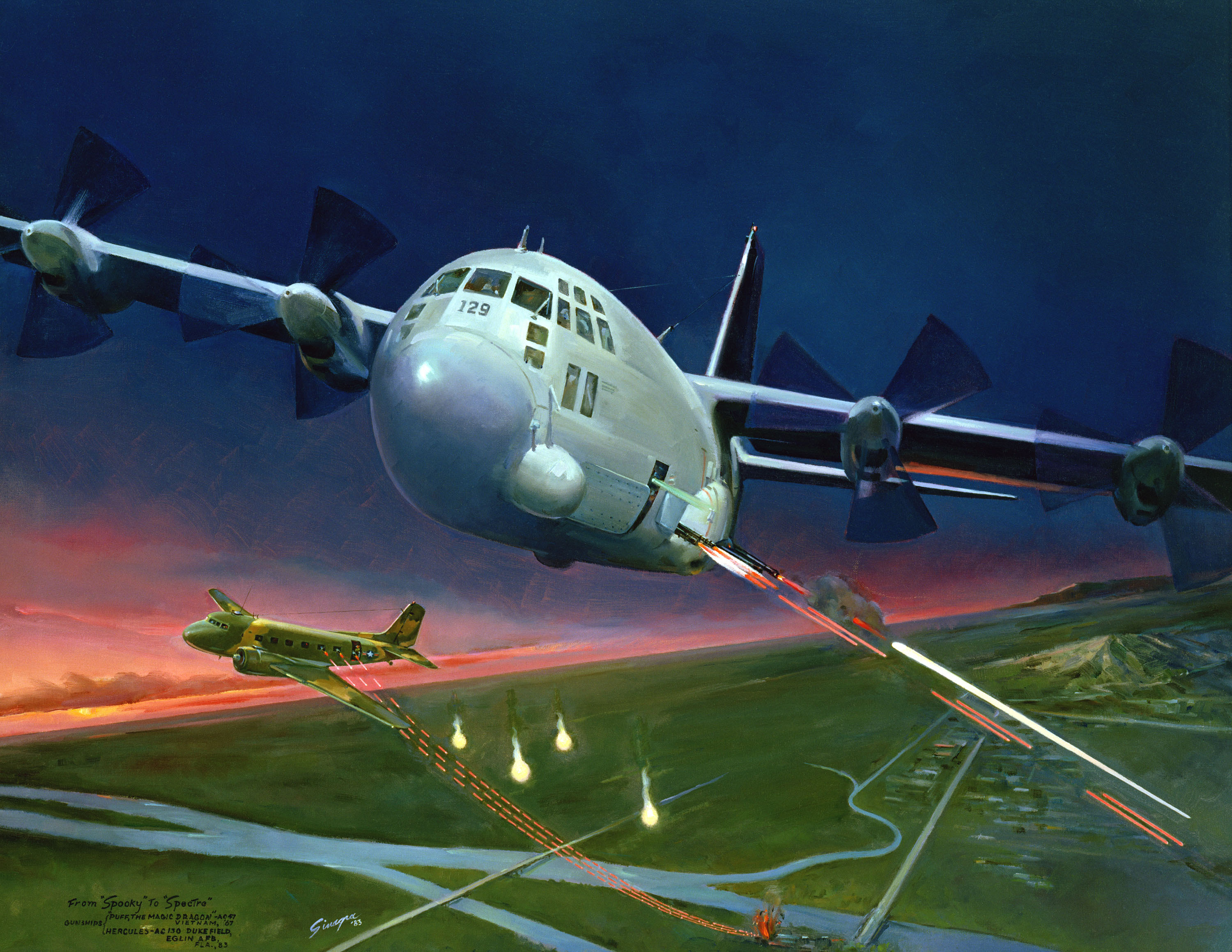
"From SPOOKY to Spectre" from the USAF Art Collection, artist depiction of an AC-130 Spectre and AC-47 Spooky gunship, both engaging targets

The current unit was organized as the Weapons School Special Operations Forces Division on 15 March 2000 at Hurlburt Field, Florida. The unit designation was changed to Detachment 1, 16th Operations Group on 10 August 2000 to align it with the group charged with providing aircraft and personnel who would help build the course.

Redesignated in 2003 as the 14th Weapons Squadron at Hurlburt Field, Florida, to provide advanced training in weapons and tactics employment to Special Operations officer aircrew members in the Lockheed AC-130H Spectre, Lockheed AC-130U Spooky, Lockheed AC-130W Stinger II, Sikorsky MH-53 Pave Low, Lockheed MC-130E Combat Talon I, Lockheed MC-130H Combat Talon II, Lockheed MC-130P Combat Shadow, and Lockheed MC-130J Commando II special operations aircraft. The MH-53 Pave Low weapons instructor course ended with the retirement of the MH-53 aircraft.

== Lineage ==
14th Liaison Squadron

- Constituted as the 14th Observation Squadron (Light) on 5 February 1942

Activated on 2 March 1942
Redesignated 14th Observation Squadron on 4 July 1942
Redesignated 14th Liaison Squadron on 2 April 1943
Inactivated on 25 March 1949
Consolidated with the 14th Air Commando Squadron as the 14th Special Operations Squadron on 19 September 1985

14th Weapons Squadron

- Constituted as the 14th Air Commando Squadron (Fire Support) on 19 October 1967 and activated (not organized)

Organized on 25 October 1967
Discontinued and inactivated on 1 May 1968
Consolidated with the 14th Air Commando Squadron as the 14th Special Operations Squadron on 19 September 1985

- Redesignated 14th Weapons Squadron on 24 January 2003

Activated on 3 February 2003

=== Assignments ===
- Air Force Combat Command, 2 March 1942
- Army Air Forces, 9 March 1942
- 26th Observation Group, 29 March 1942
- 73d Observation Group (later 73d Reconnaissance Group), 7 March 1943
- I Air Support Command (later I Tactical Air Division), 11 August 1943
- United States Strategic Air Forces in Europe, 4 April 1944 (attached to US Third Army for operations)
- Ninth Air Force, 10 April 1944 (attached to US Third Army for operations)
- XIX Tactical Air Command, 25 April 1944 (attached to US Third Army for operations until 15 November 1944, then to Twelfth United States Army Group)
- XII Tactical Air Command, 4 July 1945 (attached to Twelfth United States Army Group for operations until 26 July 1945, then to US Third Army for operations)
- 70th Fighter Wing, 5 October 1945 (attached to US Third Army for operations until 7 Jun 1946, then to US Constabulary)
- 64th Fighter Wing, 10 July 1946 (attached to US Constabulary for operations)
- XII Tactical Air Command, 1 May 1947 (attached to US Constabulary for operations until c. August 1947)
- Hq, Bad Kissingen Air Base, 6 October 1947
- United States Air Forces in Europe, 20 December 1947 (attached to Headquarters Command, United States Air Forces in Europe after 20 February 1948)
- 7150th Air Force Composite Wing, 1 July 1948 – 25 March 1949
- 14th Air Commando Wing, 25 October 1967 – 1 May 1968
- USAF Weapons School, 3 February 2003 – present

=== Stations ===
- Ayer Army Air Field, Massachusetts, 2 March 1942
- Hillsgrove Army Air Field, Rhode Island, 20 May 1942
- Naval Air Station Quonset Point, Rhode Island, 9 June 1942
- Hyannis Army Air Field, Massachusetts, 9 July 1942
- Vichy Army Air Field, Missouri, 17 August 1942
- William Northern Field, Tennessee, 8 September 1942
- Godman Field, Kentucky, 7 March 1943
- Camp Campbell Army Air Field, Kentucky, 25 June 1943 (operated from Lebanon, Tennessee, 27 June 1943 – 4 February 1944)
- Statesboro Army Air Field, Georgia, 6 February – 24 March 1944
- Alderley Edge, Cheshire, England, 9 April 1944
- Knutsford, Cheshire, England, 11 May 1944
- RAF Ibsley (AAF-347), England, 29 June 1944
- Néhou, Normandy, France, 6 July 1944
- Le Repas, France, 2 August 1944
- Beauchamps, France, 4 August 1944
- Poilley, Manche, France, 7 August 1944
- St Germain, France, 12 August 1944
- La Bazoge, Manche, France, 15 August 1944
- Dampierre-sur-Avre, France, 20 August 1944
- Courcy-aux-Loges, France, 25 August 1944
- Saint-Maurice-aux-Riches-Hommes, France, 30 August 1944
- Marson, France, 4 September 1944
- Gussainville, France, 14 September 1944
- Nancy-Essey Airport (Y-42), France, 12 October 1944
- Luxembourg-Sandweiler Airfield (A-97), Luxembourg, 31 December 1944
- Idar-Oberstein, Germany, 27 March 1945
- Berkersheim, Germany, 3 April 1945
- Hersfeld-Rotenburg, Germany, 11 April 1945
- Erlangen, Germany, 22 April 1945
- Regensburg-Profening Airfield (R-66), Germany, 2 May 1945
- Holzkirchen Airfield (R-93), Germany, 23 May 1945
- Bamberg, Germany, 10 July 1946
- Heidelberg, Germany, 10 February 1947
- AAF Bad Kissingen, Germany, 5 September 1947
- Heidelberg, Germany, 20 December 1947
- Wiesbaden Air Base, Germany, 20 February 1948 – 25 March 1949
- Nha Trang Air Base, South Vietnam, 25 October 1967 – 1 May 1968
- Hurlburt Field, FL, 3 February 2003 – present

=== Aircraft ===
- Stinson L-1 Vigilant, 1942-1943
- Piper L-4 Grasshopper, 1942-1943
- Stinson L-5 Sentinel, 1943-1947
- Cessna C-78 Bobcat, 1944-1945
- Douglas AC-47 Spooky, 1967-1968
- Lockheed MC-130E Combat Talon I, 2000-2006
- Sikorsky MH-53J Pave Low, 2000-2006
- Sikiorsky MH-53M Pave Low, 2000-2006
- Lockheed MC-130P Combat Shadow, 2000-2013
- Lockheed AC-130H Spectre, 2000-2014
- Lockheed AC-130U Spooky, 2000–present
- Lockheed MC-130H Combat Talon II, 2000–present
- Pilatus U-28A, 2012–present
