= Lovell General Hospital =

Lovell General Hospital may refer to:

- Lovell General Hospital (Rhode Island), an American Civil War-era hospital in Portsmouth, Rhode Island
- Lovell General Hospital (Massachusetts), a former U.S. Army hospital located at Fort Devens in Massachusetts
