= Coast Guard Station Scituate =

US Coast Guard station in Massachusetts

- Part of 1st District
- Scituate, Massachusetts

Site information
- Type: Coast Guard Station
- Owner: United States Coast Guard
- Open to the public: Yes

Location
- Coordinates: 42°11′56.32″N 70°42′59.80″W

Site history
- In use: 1936-Present

United States Coast Guard Station (Small) Scituate is a comparatively small and seasonally open United States Coast Guard station located in Scituate, Massachusetts. It is operated jointly with Station Point Allerton and falls under Sector Boston.

== See also ==
- List of military installations in Massachusetts
