= Camp Wellfleet =

Former US military training camp in Massachusetts

- Wellfleet, Massachusetts
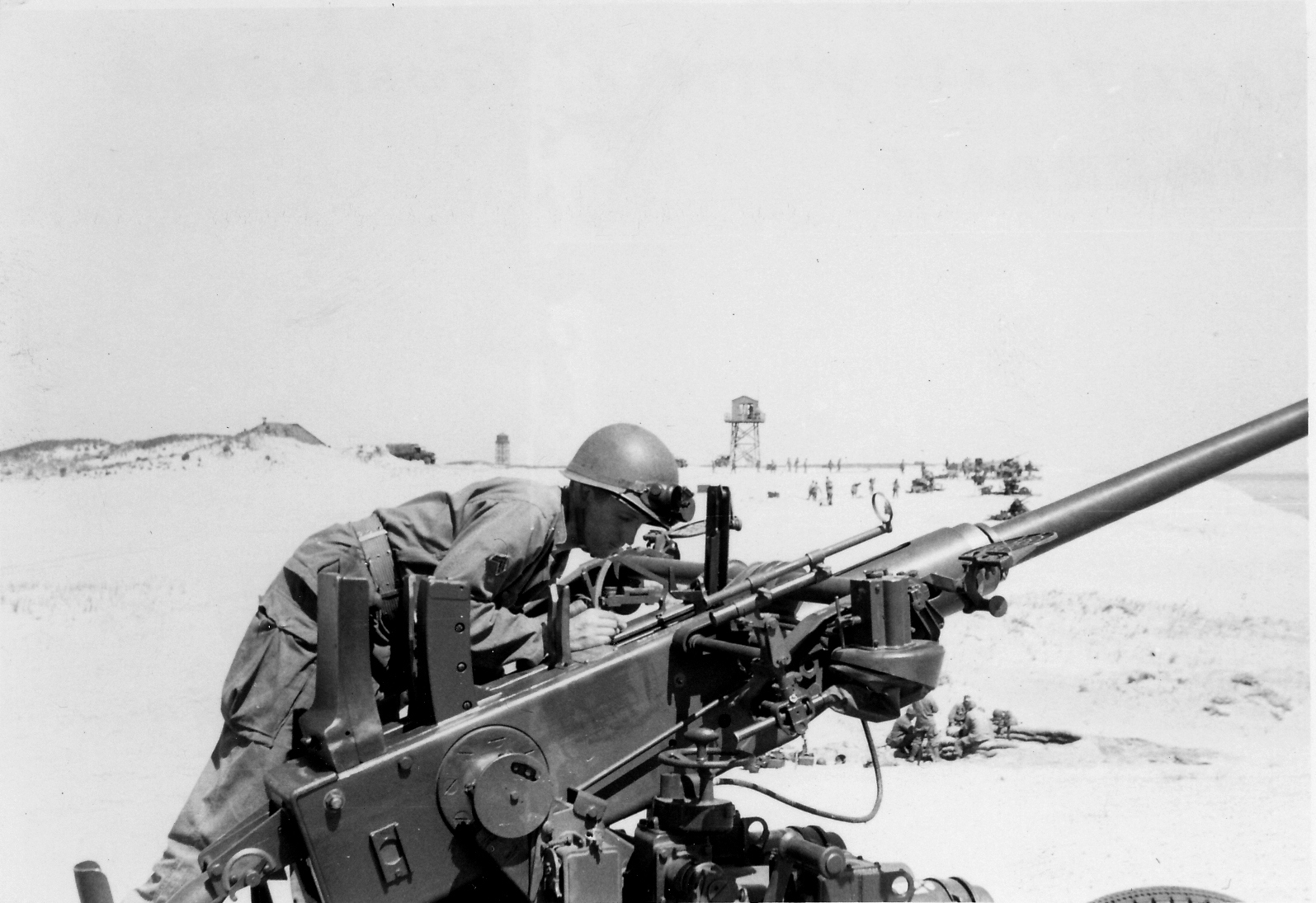
- A gunner checking the elevation on his 40 mm Bofors gun

Site information
- Type: Gunnery/Rocketry/Bombing Range
- Owner: Department of Defense
- Open to the public: Yes

Location
- Location of Camp Wellfleet
- Coordinates: 41°53′51.14″N 69°58′27.78″W
- Area: 1,738 acres (2.7 sq mi; 7.0 km^{2})

Site history
- Built: 1942
- In use: 1943–1961
- Fate: Demolished in the 1960s, now the headquarters of the Cape Cod National Seashore

Camp Wellfleet is a former United States military training camp. It occupies about 1,738 acres (7.03 km^{2}) of land located along the Atlantic Ocean in the town of Wellfleet, Massachusetts, on Cape Cod. The 548th Antiaircraft Artillery Battalion (75mm Gun) used the Camp for a firing range from 1954 to 1956. The majority of the site (1,688.8 acres) is owned and maintained by the National Park Service, as the administrator of the Cape Cod National Seashore. The Town of Wellfleet owns a portion (49.2 acres) of the site. It was officially opened on March 19, 1943.

== Military use ==
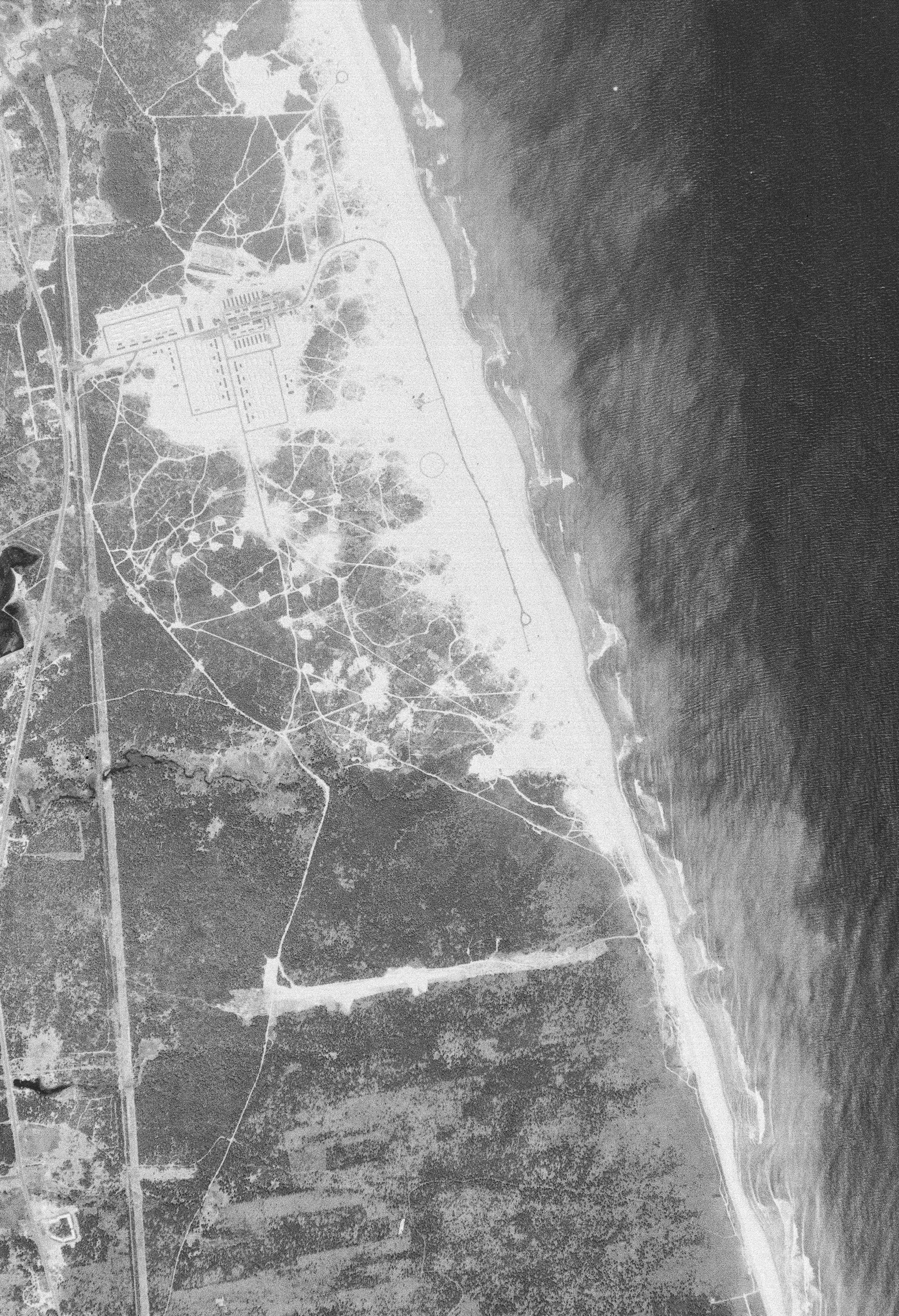
Camp Wellfleet in 1960

For almost 19 years, the former Camp Wellfleet property was used by the U.S. Government for military training purposes. The United States Army also conducted several surface removal clearances prior to property transfer. The property was used by the Army as an anti-aircraft training center from 1942 to 1944; Camp Edwards in the western part of the cape was also used for this. By June 1944, Camp Wellfleet encompassed 1,948 acres (788 ha) with a capacity of 64 officers and 1,052 enlisted personnel. In 1944, the United States Navy obtained a permit to use a portion of the property as a temporary bomb target, and it became a sub-installation of Naval Auxiliary Air Facility Hyannis. The Navy returned the site to the Army in 1947, and after World War II it was used as a training center for guardsmen and reservists.

== National Park usage ==
In 1961, the site was declared excess and conveyed to the United States Department of the Interior by President John F. Kennedy to establish the Cape Cod National Seashore.

== Army Corps of Engineers Investigations ==
The periodic discovery of ordnance in beach areas heavily used by the general public, coupled with the potentially large volume of ordnance suspected to be at the site, resulted in the initiation of an Engineering Evaluation/Cost Analysis (EE/CA) at the site by the United States Army Corps of Engineers. During the EE/CA investigations of 1998-1999, geophysical surveys were conducted, and followed by intrusive investigation of geophysical anomalies, resulting in the finding of a rifle smoke grenade, inert 1000 pound Dove missiles, and one inert 250 pound bomb. The EE/CA report recommended implementation of institutional controls and clearance of ordnance along coastal areas (where the majority of ordnance was used). The EE/CA was followed by an aerial magnetic survey conducted by Oak Ridge National Laboratory. The success of the survey was somewhat limited by tree cover, but 345 magnetic anomalies were identified for further investigation. Government contractor Zapata Engineering investigated the anomalies and conducted further geophysical surveys, and discovered other ordnance items. A removal action was conducted in a 5-acre area east of the southern parking lot where a rocket range had existed.

A Remedial Investigation (RI) was conducted by ERT, Inc. in 2019. The report assessed the previous geophysical surveys and intrusive results but no further investigation for munitions was conducted. Fieldwork focused on munitions constituents. Incremental sampling of surface and subsurface soil was conducted, and soils were tested for select metals and explosives. No analytical results were above project screening levels or above EPA Ecological Soil Screening Levels.

In the decades since the military used the property, various ordnance items, including anti-aircraft projectiles, bazooka rounds, smoke grenades, and small arms ammunition have been recovered. The majority of this was found along the beach and dune areas due to wave action and erosion.

== Site today ==
It is not uncommon to find bazooka and anti-aircraft rounds on the beach. A 14-inch long round was found in 2014 and detonated on site.

== See also ==
- South Weymouth Naval Air Station
- Nomans Land
- Otis Air Force Base
- SS James Longstreet
- List of military installations in Massachusetts
