= Loran Transmitting Station Martha's Vineyard =

Martha's Vineyard LORAN-C
- Interactive map of the Martha's Vineyard LORAN-C area

General information
- Status: Demolished
- Type: Mast radiator insulated against ground
- Location: Aquinnah, Massachusetts
- Coordinates: 41°20′48.86″N 70°50′12.40″W
- Completed: 1957
- Demolished: 1962

Height
- Height: 625 ft (191 m)

Design and construction
- Main contractor: US Coast Guard

Martha's Vineyard LORAN-C transmitter was a LORAN-C transmitter at Aquinnah, Massachusetts. It was built in 1957 with a 625-foot (191 m) tall mast radiator. It was closed in 1962 and operations were transferred to LORAN-C transmitter Nantucket at that time.

== See also ==
- List of masts
- List of military installations in Massachusetts
