= List of military installations in Massachusetts =

List of current and former military installations in Massachusetts

This is a list of current and former military installations in the Commonwealth of Massachusetts.

== Current military installations in Massachusetts ==
=== Joint facilities ===
Bases

- Joint Base Cape Cod (state designation, not federally recognized)

Centers

- David S. Connolly Armed Forces Reserve Center
- Westover Armed Forces Reserve Center

=== United States Army ===
Camps

- Camp Edwards
- Camp Curtis Guild

Centers

- Crosman Army Reserve Center
- Poncin Army Reserve Center
- Combat Capabilities Development Command Soldier Center

Forts

- Fort Devens

Heliports

- Camp Edwards Heliport

Laboratories

- Base Camp Integration Laboratory

=== United States Navy ===
Centers

- Navy Operational Support Center Quincy

=== United States Air Force ===
Bases

- Barnes Air National Guard Base
- Hanscom Air Force Base
- Otis Air National Guard Base
- Westover Air Reserve Base

=== United States Space Force ===
Stations

- Cape Cod Space Force Station

=== United States Coast Guard ===
Air Stations

- Coast Guard Air Station Cape Cod

Bases

- Coast Guard Base Boston
- Coast Guard Base Cape Cod

Depots

- United States Coast Guard Buoy Depot, South Weymouth

Stations

- Coast Guard Station Brant Point
- Coast Guard Station Cape Cod Canal
- Coast Guard Station Chatham
- Coast Guard Station Gloucester
- Coast Guard Station Menemsha
- Coast Guard Station Merrimack River
- Coast Guard Station Point Allerton
- Coast Guard Station Provincetown
- Coast Guard Station Scituate
- Coast Guard Station Woods Hole

== Former military installations in Massachusetts ==
=== United States Army ===
Army Airfields

- Hyannis Army Airfield
- Moore Army Airfield
- New Bedford Army Airfield
- Otis Army Airfield

Armories

- Hudson Armory
- Lawrence Light Guard Armory
- Springfield Armory
- Water Shops Armory

Arsenals

- Charlestown Arsenal
- Watertown Arsenal

Bases

- South Boston Army Base

Camps

- Camp Adams
- Camp Andrew
- Camp Banks
- Camp Brigham
- Camp Cameron
- Camp Candoit
- Camp Chase
- Camp Dalton
- Camp Edmunds
- Camp Ellsworth
- Camp Framingham (Dalton, Bartlett, McGuinness, Dewey)
- Camp Guild
- Camp Havedoneit
- Camp Hill
- Camp Hingham
- Camp Hobson
- Camp Joe Hooker
- Camp Houston
- Ipswich Camp
- Camp Lander
- Camp Lincoln
- Camp Massasoit
- Camp Meigs
- Camp Myles Standish
- Camp Perkins
- Plymouth Camp
- Camp Prescott
- Camp Prospect Hill
- Camp Scott
- South Hingham Camp
- Camp Stanton
- Camp Sutton
- Camp Washburn
- Camp Wellfleet
- Camp Wightman
- Camp Wool

Centers

- Antiaircraft Artillery Training Center, Camp Edwards
- Gardner Army Reserve Center
- Greenfield United States Army Reserve Center
- United States Army Reserve Center Hingham
- MacArthur Army Reserve Center
- Harry J. Malony United States Army Reserve Center
- Millis United States Army Reserve Center

Firing Ranges

- Popponesset Firing Range
- Scorton Neck Firing Range

Forts

- Acushnet Fort
- Fort Andrew
- Fort Andrews
- Fort Banks
- Beverly Fort
- Fort Dalton
- Fort Dawes
- Fort Defiance
- Fort Duvall
- Eastern Point Fort
- Fort Glover (Gilbert Heights Fort)
- Fort Heath
- Fort Independence
- Fort Juniper
- Fort Lee
- Long Point Battery
- Fort Miller (Fort Darby)
- Fort Nichols (Fort Merrimac)
- Old Stone Fort
- Fort Philip
- Fort Phoenix
- Fort Pickering
- Fort Revere
- Fort Taber (Rodman)
- Fort Ruckman
- Fort at Salisbury Point
- Fort Sewall
- Stage Fort
- Fort Standish (Boston)
- Fort Standish (Plymouth)
- Fort Strong (East Boston & Long Island)
- Fort Warren
- Fort Washington
- Fort Winthrop

Heliports

- George H. Crosman United States Army Reserve Center Heliport

Hospitals

- Lovell General Hospital East
- Lovell General Hospital North
- Lovell General Hospital South
- Murphy Army Hospital

Labs

- Army Materials Technology Laboratory

Nike Sites

- Reading Nike Site B-03
- Danvers Nike Site B-05
- Beverly Nike Site B-15
- Nahant Nike Site B-17
- Fort Heath Nike Site B-21DC
- Fort Banks Nike Site B-21R
- Fort Duvall Nike Site B-36
- Weymouth (Quincy) Nike Site B-37
- Hingham Nike Site B-38
- Blue Hills (Milton) Nike Site B-55
- Needham Nike Site B-63
- Lincoln (Wayland) Nike Site B-73
- Burlington Nike Site B-84
- Bedford Nike Site B-85
- Rehoboth Nike Site PR-19
- Swansea Nike Site PR-29

Plants

- Lowell Ordnance Plant
- Pilgrim Ordnance Works

Proving grounds

- Scituate Proving Ground

Military Reservations

- Barneys Joy Point Military Reservation
- Brewster Islands Military Reservation
- Butler Point Military Reservation
- Calf Island Military Reservation
- East Point Military Reservation
- Elizabeth Islands Military Reservation
- Fourth Cliff Military Reservation
- Long Island Military Reservation
- Lovell's Island Military Reservation
- Mishaum Point Military Reservation
- Sagamore Hill Military Reservation
- Salisbury Beach Military Reservation

Training

- Fort Devens-Sudbury Training Annex

=== United States Navy ===
Naval Air Stations

- Naval Air Station Chatham
- Naval Air Station South Weymouth
- Naval Air Station Squantum
- Naval Training Station Marblehead
- Massachusetts State Militia Aviation Camp

Naval Airfields

- No Man's Land Navy Airfield

Naval Ammunition Depots

- Hingham Naval Ammunition Depot (Hingham Naval Ammunition Depot Annex)

Areas

- Gull Island Bomb Area
- Tisbury Great Pond Target Area
- Weepecket Island Bomb Area

Naval Auxiliary Air Facilities

- Naval Auxiliary Air Facility Ayer
- Naval Auxiliary Air Facility Beverly
- Naval Auxiliary Air Facility Hyannis
- Naval Auxiliary Air Facility Martha's Vineyard
- Naval Auxiliary Air Facility Nantucket
- Naval Auxiliary Air Facility New Bedford
- Naval Auxiliary Air Facility Otis

Camps

- Camp Hingham
- Camp Plunkett (Navy predecessor to Camp Curtis Guild)

Facilities

- United States Naval Mine Test Facility, Provincetown
- Naval Facility Nantucket

Hospitals

- Naval Hospital Boston

Plants

- Naval Weapons Industrial Reserve Plant, Bedford

Outlying Landing Fields

- Naval Outlying Landing Field Mansfield
- Naval Outlying Landing Field Norwood
- Naval Outlying Landing Field Plymouth
- Naval Outlying Landing Field Westfield

Reserve Centers

- Naval Reserve Center, Chicopee
- Navy and Marine Corps Reserve Center, Lawrence

Ranges

- Nomans Land Range
- Sandy Neck Bomb Target Range

Test Stations

- United States Navy Field Test Station, Fort Heath

Naval shipyards

- Boston Navy Yard (Chelsea Naval Annex, East Boston Naval Annex, Boston Naval Yard Fuel Depot Annex)
- South Boston Naval Annex

=== United States Air Force ===
Air Force Bases

- Otis Air Force Base
- Westover Air Force Base

Centers

- Air Force Electronic Systems Center

Facilities

- Air Force Special Projects Production Facility
- Post Attack Command and Control System Facility, Hadley

Hospitals

- 551st United States Air Force Hospital (Otis AFB)
- Westover Air Force Base Hospital

Laboratories

- Air Force Cambridge Research Laboratories
- Fort Franklin Battlespace Laboratory

Air Force Plants

- United States Air Force Plant 28
- United States Air Force Plant 29
- United States Air Force Plant 63
- United States Air Force Plant 69

Ranges

- Monomoy Island Gunnery Range
- Quabbin Reservoir Precision Bombing and Gunnery Range

Air Force Stations

- North Truro Air Force Station
- Stony Brook Air Force Station

Texas Towers

- Texas Tower 2
- Texas Tower 3

=== United States Coast Guard ===
Air Stations

- Coast Guard Air Station Salem
- Coast Guard Aviation Station Ten Pound Island

Loran

- Loran Transmitting Station Martha’s Vineyard
- LORAN-C transmitter Nantucket

Stations

- Coast Guard Station Manomet Point
- Coast Guard Station Nauset
- Coast Guard Station New Bedford
