= Air Force Special Projects Production Facility =

Coordinates: 42°12′0.54″N 72°32′46.53″W

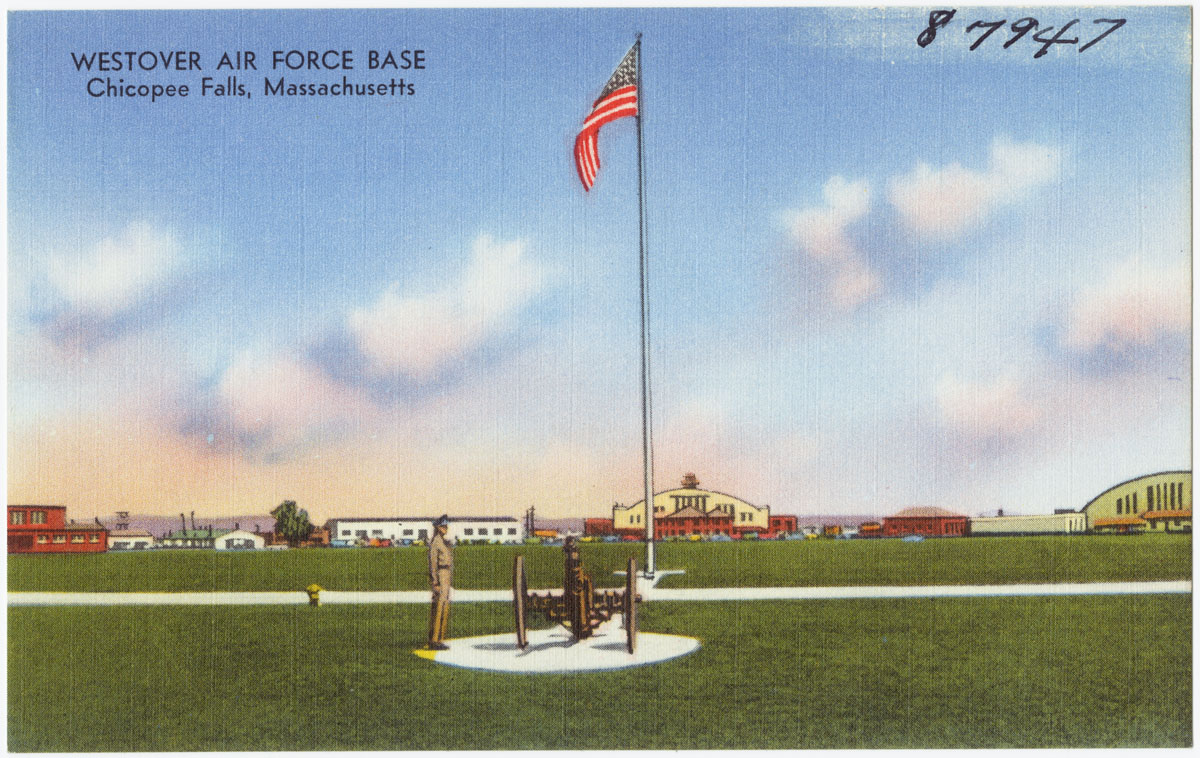
Postcard of Westover Air Force Base

The Air Force Special Projects Production Facility was a top-secret facility operational at Westover Air Force Base from 1961 to 1976. It was responsible for developing film from the Corona satellite program and other film projects that were top secret. The facility was co-located with the 8th Reconnaissance Technical Squadron and developed the film used during the Cuban Missile Crisis. It was also the primary production facility for the National Reconnaissance Program during this time. The facility was also in charge of the Controlled Range Network, which served to calibrate Corona, Gambit, and Hexagon satellite programs.

== See also ==
- List of military installations in Massachusetts
