= Camp Edwards Heliport =

- IATA: none; ICAO: none; FAA LID: MA29

Summary
- Airport type: Private
- Owner: Massachusetts Army National Guard / U.S. Army
- Location: Camp Edwards / Bourne, Massachusetts
- In use: 1943-Present
- Elevation AMSL: 135 ft (41 m)
- Coordinates: 41°40′17″N 070°33′53″W

Map
- Location within Cape Cod

Helipads
Number	Length		Surface
Number	ft	m	Surface
H1	117	36	Concrete

Statistics
- Based aircraft: 17
- Source: Federal Aviation Administration

Camp Edwards Heliport (FAA LID: MA29) is a private use heliport located at Camp Edwards, a U.S. Army facility in Barnstable County, Massachusetts, United States. The airport is located three nautical miles (6 km) north of the central business district of Bourne, Massachusetts. It is owned by the Massachusetts Army National Guard.

== Facilities and aircraft ==
Camp Edwards Heliport has one helipad designated H1 with a concrete surface measuring 117 by 40 feet (36 x 12 m). There are 17 helicopters based at this facility.

== See also ==
- List of military installations in Massachusetts
