= Tisbury Great Pond Target Area =

Tisbury Target Area
- Part of United States Navy
- Tisbury, Massachusetts

Site information
- Type: Range
- Owner: Private
- Controlled by: Unknown

Location
- Coordinates: 41°20′51″N 70°38′56″W

Tisbury Great Island Bomb Area was a former naval bomb area for aviators, located in Great Pond, Tisbury, Massachusetts.

== See also ==
- List of military installations in Massachusetts
