= Camp Hill (Massachusetts) =

Military encampment in Oxford, Massachusetts

Coordinates: 42.1167°N 71.8726°W

Camp Hill was an encampment site of the Provisional Army of the United States that existed from 1799 to 1800 in Oxford, Massachusetts. A marker placed by the General Ebenezer Learned chapter of the Daughters of the American Revolution commemorates the encampment of Colonel Nathan Rice's regiment in those years. The camp was visited by Alexander Hamilton as the Senior Officer of the United States Army in 1800.

== See also ==
- List of military installations in Massachusetts
