= Naval Training Station Marblehead =

United States Naval Training Station for Aviation, Marblehead
- IATA: none; ICAO: none

Summary
- Airport type: Military: Naval Air Station
- Operator: U.S. Navy
- Location: Marblehead, Massachusetts
- In use: 1915 - 1917
- Occupants: Navy
- Elevation AMSL: 6 ft / 2 m
- Coordinates: 42°29′56.74″N 70°50′27.72″W
- Interactive map of United States Naval Training Station for Aviation, Marblehead
- Redeveloped

United States Naval Training Station for Aviation, Marblehead was an active naval aviation facility in Marblehead, Massachusetts from 1915 to 1917, upon the opening of Naval Air Station Squantum.

== See also ==
- List of military installations in Massachusetts
