= Beverly Fort =

Fort in Beverly, Massachusetts, U.S.

Coordinates: 42°32′49″N 70°51′22″W

Beverly Fort was a fort that existed from 1775 to 1776 during the American Revolutionary War on Hospital Point in Beverly, Massachusetts. It was reoccupied in 1814 during the War of 1812. In 1801, a smallpox hospital was built and used in 1814 as a barracks. The J-shaped earthwork of the fort still exists today.

== See also ==
- List of military installations in Massachusetts
