= Lawrence O. Poncin United States Army Reserve Center =

Coordinates: 41°55′58.29″N 71°17′30.21″W

The Lawrence O. Poncin is a United States Army Reserve facility located in Attleboro, Massachusetts

. This Facility was named after 1st Sgt. Lawrence O. Poncin, a 20-year Army Reserve member, killed while serving in his civilian job as a city public works employee, when a natural gas explosion blew up a home on George Street killing Poncin and a co-worker Bernard Hewitt Capt. Roger Maag, commander of B Company, 368th Engineer Battalion oversaw the Naming of the reserve center to honor 1Sgt Poncin. As of 11/2025 there is no Military Vehicles in the parking lot, there are no civilian vehicles in the parking areas out front (indicating Staff use/Caretaker). It has been Vacated for several years with no community explanation (Information is derived from physically driving by the facility on Thatcher St Attleboro (an elevated position)) The Army Reserve Center is accessed from John Williams Street.[2]

== See also ==
- List of military installations in Massachusetts
