= Naval Reserve Center, Chicopee =

Naval Reserve Center, Chicopee is a former United States Navy reserve center located in Chicopee, Massachusetts. It was closed per the recommendations of the 1995 Base Realignment and Closure Commission, and consolidated to Naval Reserve Center, Quincy.

== See also ==
- List of military installations in Massachusetts
