= Water Shops Armory =

- U.S. National Register of Historic Places
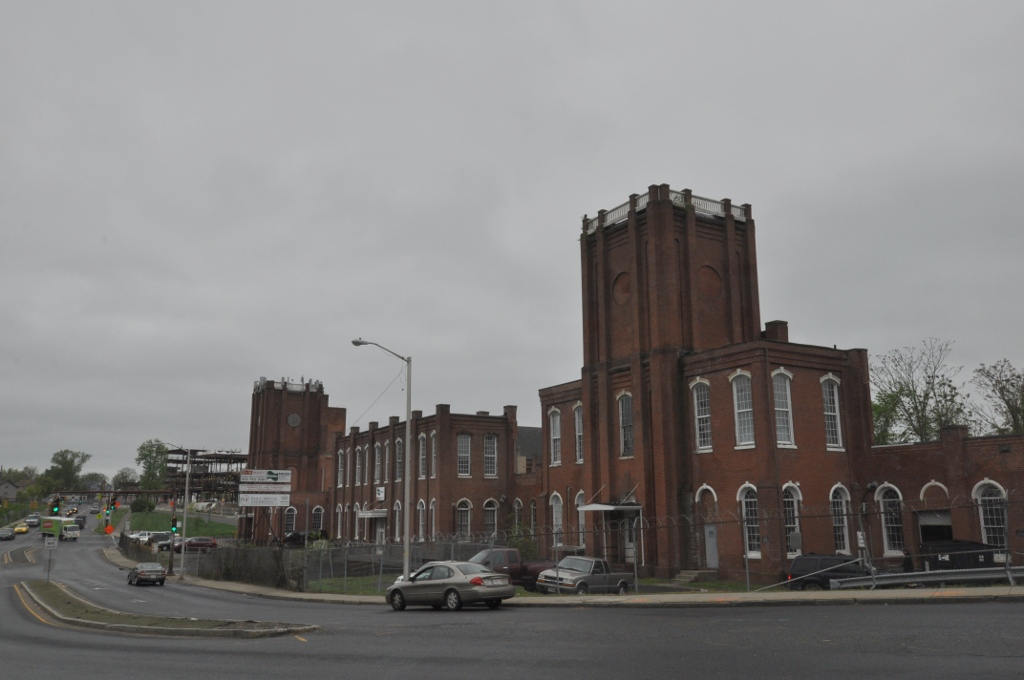
- Location: 1 Allen St; Springfield, Massachusetts
- Coordinates: 42.096981°N 72.563306°W
- Area: 4.6 acres (1.9 ha)
- Architect: United States Army
- NRHP reference No.: 80000476
- Added to NRHP: December 3, 1980

The Water Shops Armory, located at 1 Allen Street, was a part of the Springfield Armory in Springfield, Massachusetts. Developed beginning in 1857, it served as the heavy manufacturing complex for the armory. It was listed on the National Register of Historic Places in 1980.

== Description and history ==
The main armory stretched over two city blocks in what was known as the Hill Shops (where the National Historic Site now is accompanied by the Springfield Technical Community College which occupies most of the 22 original buildings). About one mile (1.6 km) south, on the Mill River, the United States Army built the Water Shops where the heavy metal forging and machining was done as well as gun stock shaping. It was located there to take advantage of the water power supplied by the Mill River. The complex consists of several buildings, most of them connected into one large grouping, set in part astride the river below the dam that impounds Watershops Pond.

When the armory was established in 1794, the Mill River was where it established a series of early workshops, at three different falls. In the 1850s, these facilities were reorganized into a single site, with the first of the present buildings built in 1857. Over the next four years, additional buildings augmented the capabilities of the site, giving it sufficient capacity to meet the armory's heavy manufacturing needs. The dam and canal were built to raise the level of Watershops Pond, and new turbines were installed to provide 300 horsepower for the facilities.

The Water Shops complex is now a privately owned industrial site. The main building was severely damaged on Friday June 17, 1988, when a fire destroyed part of the top floors. The building was built in two different sections: the first was built in 1858, and the second section, which paralleled Allen Street and was built in 1901, is where the fire happened.

== See also ==
- National Register of Historic Places listings in Springfield, Massachusetts
- National Register of Historic Places listings in Hampden County, Massachusetts
- List of military installations in Massachusetts
