= Ten Pound Island Light =

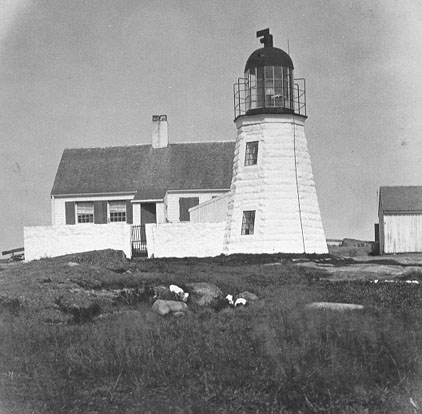
- The 1821 lighthouse
- Location: Gloucester, Massachusetts
- Coordinates: 42°36′6.7″N 70°39′56″W

Tower
- Constructed: 1821
- Foundation: Brick
- Construction: Stone and cast iron
- Automated: 1934
- Height: 39 feet (12 m)
- Shape: Conical tower
- Markings: White with black lantern
- Heritage: National Register of Historic Places listed place
- Fog signal: Original: Bell; Now: Horn: 2 every 20 seconds

Light
- First lit: 1881
- Deactivated: 1956 - 1989
- Focal height: 57 feet (17 m)
- Lens: 5th order Fresnel lens (original), 9.8 inches (250 mm) lens (current)
- Range: 5 nautical miles (9.3 km; 5.8 mi)
- Characteristic: Isophase Red 6 seconds
- Ten Pound Island Light
- U.S. National Register of Historic Places
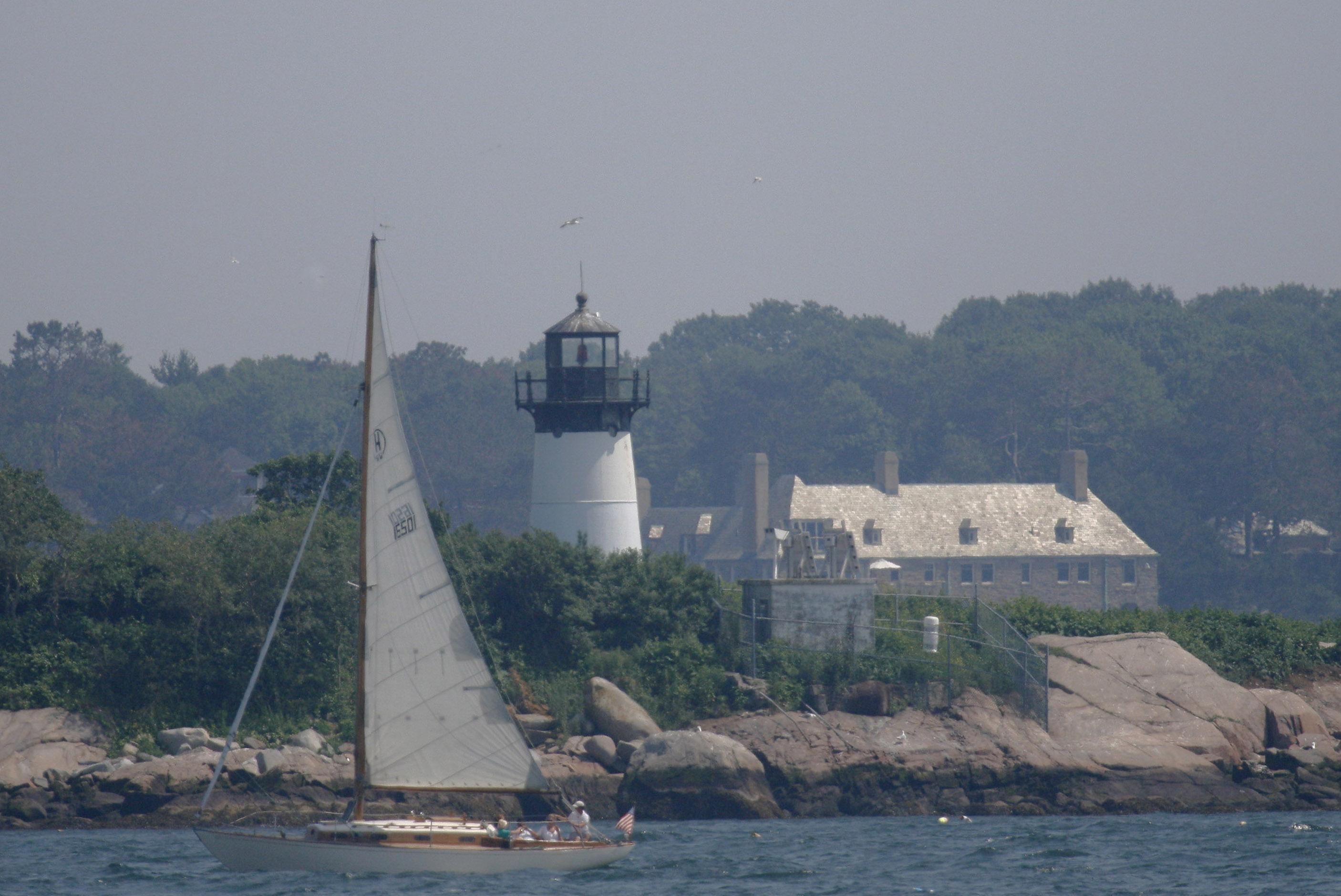
- Built: 1881
- MPS: Lighthouses of Massachusetts TR
- NRHP reference No.: 88001179
- Added to NRHP: August 4, 1988

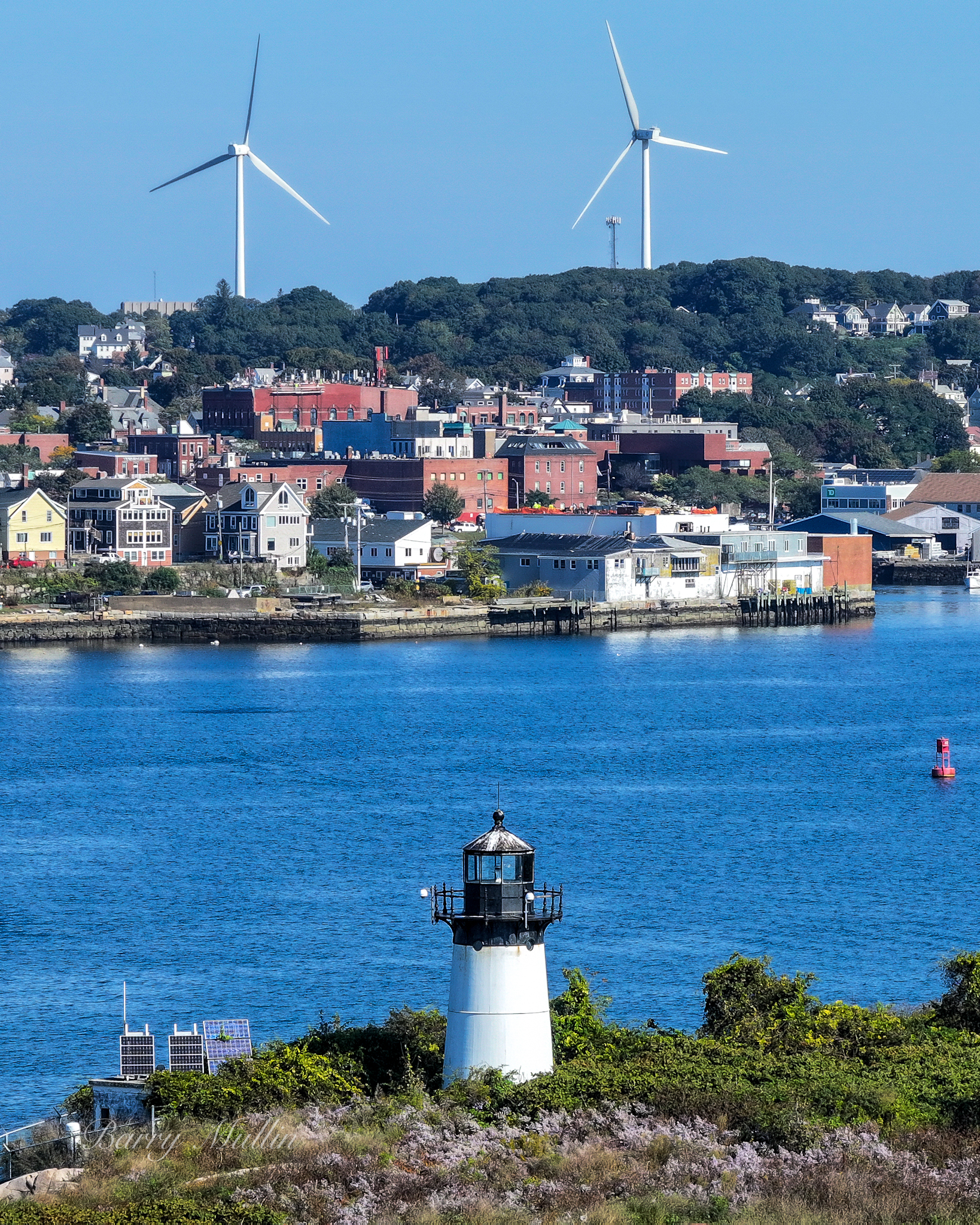
Ten Pound Island Lighthouse during a beautiful morning with the City of Gloucester, MA in the distance.(Drone Photography by Barry Mullin)

The Ten Pound Island Light is a historic lighthouse in Gloucester Harbor in Gloucester, Massachusetts. It is located on Ten Pound Island, near the eastern end of the harbor. The tower, built in 1881, is a conical cast iron structure 30 feet (9.1 m) tall, replacing a stone tower first built on the site in 1821. The main body is painted white, and the top is painted black.

The tower is the only surviving part of a more extensive light station, which included a keeper's house and an oil house. The island additionally hosted a federal fish hatchery and a Coast Guard air (seaplane) station; only ruins survive.

The lighthouse was listed on the National Register of Historic Places in 1988. Both Winslow Homer and Fitz Henry Lane painted the first tower.

== See also ==
- Annisquam Harbor Light
- National Register of Historic Places listings in Gloucester, Massachusetts
- National Register of Historic Places listings in Essex County, Massachusetts
