= Mansfield Municipal Airport =

- IATA: none; ICAO: none; FAA LID: 1B9

Summary
- Airport type: Public
- Operator: Town of Mansfield
- Location: Mansfield, Massachusetts
- Opened: May 1943
- Elevation AMSL: 122 ft / 37.2 m
- Coordinates: 42°00′00″N 71°11′48″W
- Website: mansfieldma.com/204

Map
- Interactive map of Mansfield Municipal Airport

Runways
Direction	Length		Surface
Direction	ft	m	Surface
14/32	3,500	1,067	Asphalt
4/22	2,200	671	Turf

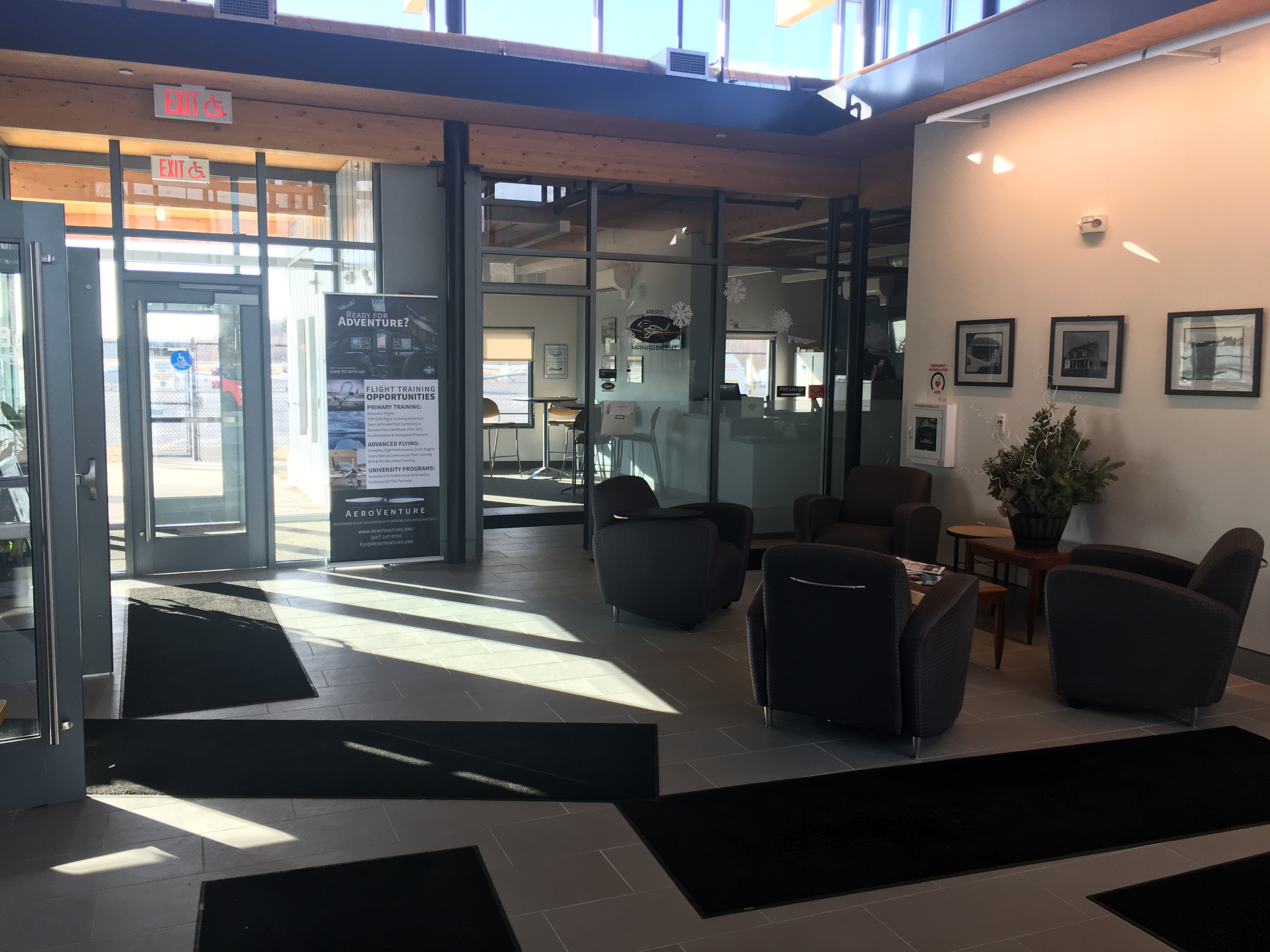

Mansfield Municipal Airport (FAA LID: 1B9) is a public airport located 2 mi (1.7 nmi; 3.2 km) southeast of the central business district of Mansfield, a town in Bristol County, Massachusetts, United States. During World War II, the airfield was Naval Outlying Landing Field Mansfield.

It is a community airport located 1 mi (1.6 km) from the Xfinity Center. The airport offers flight training, fuel, etc.

== Facilities ==
Mansfield Municipal Airport covers 230 acres (93 ha) and has two runways:

- Runway 14/32: 3,500 ft × 75 ft (1,067 m × 23 m), Surface: Asphalt
- Runway 4/22: 2,200 ft × 100 ft (671 m × 30 m), Surface: Turf

== Accidents and incidents ==
- On 26 July 1981, a Piper Colt crashed shortly after takeoff; the pilot and passenger were uninjured.
- On 28 January 1984, a Piper Arrow that departed Mansfield disappeared. Its wreckage was located near Gardner Municipal Airport on 10 February 1984; none of the four occupants survived.
- On 8 September 2007, A Cessna 172 crashed on takeoff, killing two of the four occupants.
- On 15 February 2014, a Cessna 172 practicing landings hit a snowbank and skidded off the runway; the pilot was uninjured.
- On 23 February 2019, a flight instructor and student were killed when their Cessna 172 crashed at Mansfield; they had departed Norwood Memorial Airport an hour earlier.

== See also ==
- List of airports in Massachusetts
