= Coast Guard Station Cape Cod Canal =

US Coast Guard station in Massachusetts

- Part of 1st District
- Sandwich, Massachusetts

Site information
- Type: Coast Guard Station
- Owner: United States Coast Guard
- Open to the public: Yes

Location
- Coordinates: 41°46′20.85″N 70°30′1.09″W

Site history
- In use: 1936-Present

United States Coast Guard Station Cape Cod Canal is a United States Coast Guard station located in Sandwich, Massachusetts. It operates patrol boats along the coast of Cape Cod, the Cape Cod Canal, and the treacherous waters of Buzzards Bay.

== See also ==
- List of military installations in Massachusetts
