= Annisquam Harbor Light =

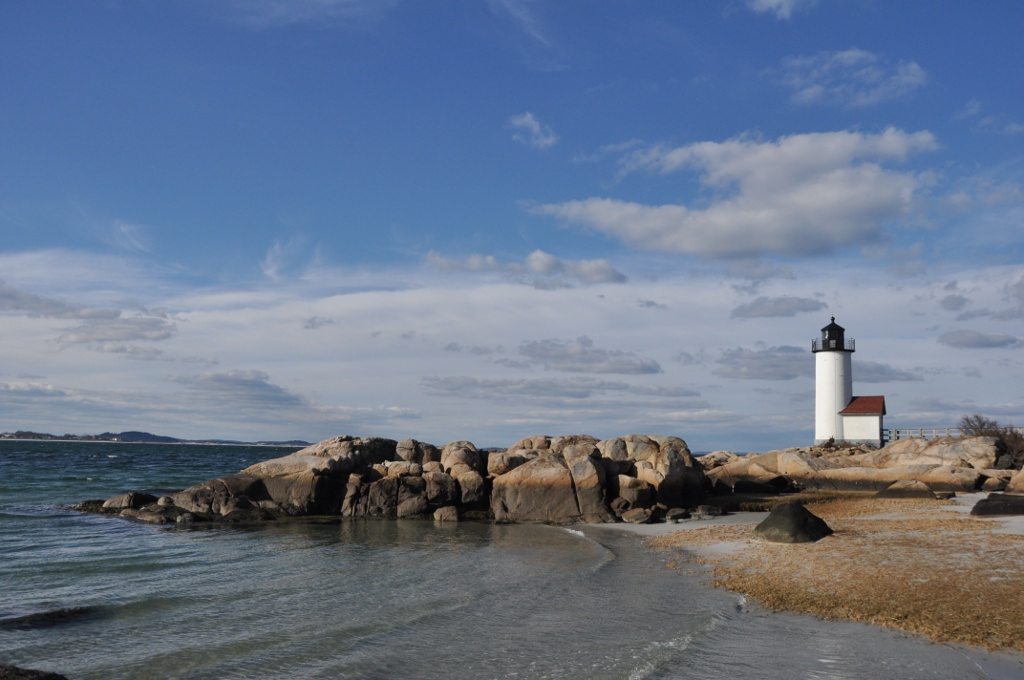
- Location: Wigwam Pt., Gloucester, Massachusetts
- Coordinates: 42°39′42.781″N 70°40′53.44″W

Tower
- Constructed: 1801
- Foundation: Stone
- Construction: Brick
- Automated: 1974
- Height: 45 ft (14 m)
- Shape: Cylindrical
- Markings: White with black lantern
- Heritage: National Register of Historic Places listed place
- Fog signal: 19th century: Bell; 1931: Horn, 2 every 60s

Light
- First lit: 1898
- Focal height: 45 feet (14 m)
- Lens: 5th order Fresnel lens (original), 7.5 inches (190 mm) (current)
- Range: W 14 nautical miles (26 km; 16 mi), R 11 nautical miles (20 km; 13 mi)
- Characteristic: Fl W 7.5s with Red sector
- Annisquam Harbor Light Station
- U.S. National Register of Historic Places
- Area: 1.3 acres (0.53 ha)
- Built: 1801
- MPS: Lighthouses of Massachusetts TR
- NRHP reference No.: 87001526
- Added to NRHP: June 15, 1987

Annisquam Harbor Light Station is a historic lighthouse located on Wigwam Point in the Annisquam neighborhood of Gloucester, Massachusetts. It can be viewed from nearby Wingaersheek Beach, Gloucester. It lies on the Annisquam River and is one of the four oldest lighthouses surrounding the Gloucester peninsula, along with Eastern Point Light, Ten Pound Island Light, and Thacher Island Light.

== History ==
The first light station, a 40-foot (12 m) wooden tower, was established in 1801 after Congress allocated $2000 in April for its completion. The original building was 32 feet (9.8 m) tall, made of wood with a light resting 40 feet above the water. The building fell into disrepair and, in 1851, was replaced by an octagonal wooden tower of the same height. The original lighthouse keeper's house was repaired and, with alterations, has remained to this day; its floor plan resembles those at Race Point Light and Straitsmouth Island Light. It is a two-story, gabled roofed, wood-framed building. In 1869, a covered walkway was built between the house and the tower.

In 1897, the current brick lighthouse was built on the same foundation as the previous two constructions. Some time after 1900, the covered walkway, added in 1867, to the keeper's house was replaced by an uncovered wooden footbridge.

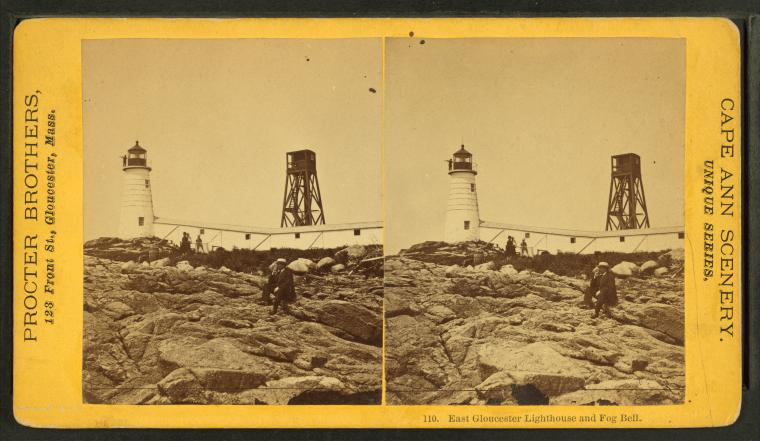
The second Annisquam Harbor Light which was replaced in 1897 Annisquam light Gloucester 2008

In 1931, a foghorn was installed, but until 1949, it was used only from October 15 to May 15 to spare summer residents the noise., but was activated in the summer of 1949 only during day hours. The lighthouse's fourth-order Fresnel lens and foghorn were automated in 1974, and became occupied by the Coast Guard. The fog signal was initially removed by the Coast Guard, but after complaints from fishermen and local boaters, it was reactivated and eventually automated as well. In August 2000 Matty Nally and his crew completed the replacement of 3,000 bricks in efforts of restoration.

The interior of the lighthouse is equipped with a circular cast-iron staircase that leads to the top. The lighthouse was added to the National Register of Historic Places in 1987, and is one of the oldest lighthouses in Massachusetts.

The original wooden keeper's house from 1801 is still used as a housing for United States Coast Guard personnel who manage the site. In 2000, a major restoration of the tower was conducted by the Coast Guard. In 2008, the building appeared, supposedly as a lighthouse in Maine, in the film remake The Women (starring Meg Ryan).

== See also ==
- National Register of Historic Places listings in Gloucester, Massachusetts
- National Register of Historic Places listings in Essex County, Massachusetts
