= Navy Reserve Center Quincy =

Coordinates: 42°15′30.12″N 70°59′41.31″W

Navy Operational Support Center Quincy is a United States Navy Reserve support center located in Quincy, Massachusetts. It was re-opened per the recommendations of the 1995 Base Realignment and Closure Commission, after being recommended for closure by the 1993 Base Realignment and Closure Commission.

== See also ==
- List of military installations in Massachusetts
