= Coast Guard Aviation Station Ten Pound Island =

Former US Coast Guard base in Gloucester, Massachusetts

- Part of 1st District
- Gloucester, Massachusetts

Site information
- Type: Coast Guard Station
- Owner: United States Coast Guard
- Open to the public: Yes
- Condition: no remains

Location
- Coordinates: 42°36′37″N 70°39′36″W

Site history
- In use: 1925–1935
- Demolished: after 1938

Coast Guard Aviation Station Ten Pound Island was a United States Coast Guard air station located in Gloucester, Massachusetts. It was established in 1925, initially to use seaplanes to spot rumrunners during Prohibition. In its first four years of operation, aircraft and personnel from the air station rendered assistance to stranded mariners and other persons on 212 occasions. Aircraft operated from the facility included the Vought UO-1 and UO-4, OL-5, and Grumman JF-2. As larger aircraft such as the General Aviation PJ-1 were developed, the facility became obsolete. It was replaced by Coast Guard Air Station Salem in 1935. As of 2008 there were no remains of the air station on the island, though the Ten Pound Island Light remains active.

Coast Guard Station Gloucester is currently on the former air station site.

== See also ==
- List of military installations in Massachusetts
