= Coast Guard Station Brant Point =

US Coast Guard Station in Nantucket, Massachusetts US

- Part of 1st District
- Brant Point, Nantucket (CDP), Massachusetts
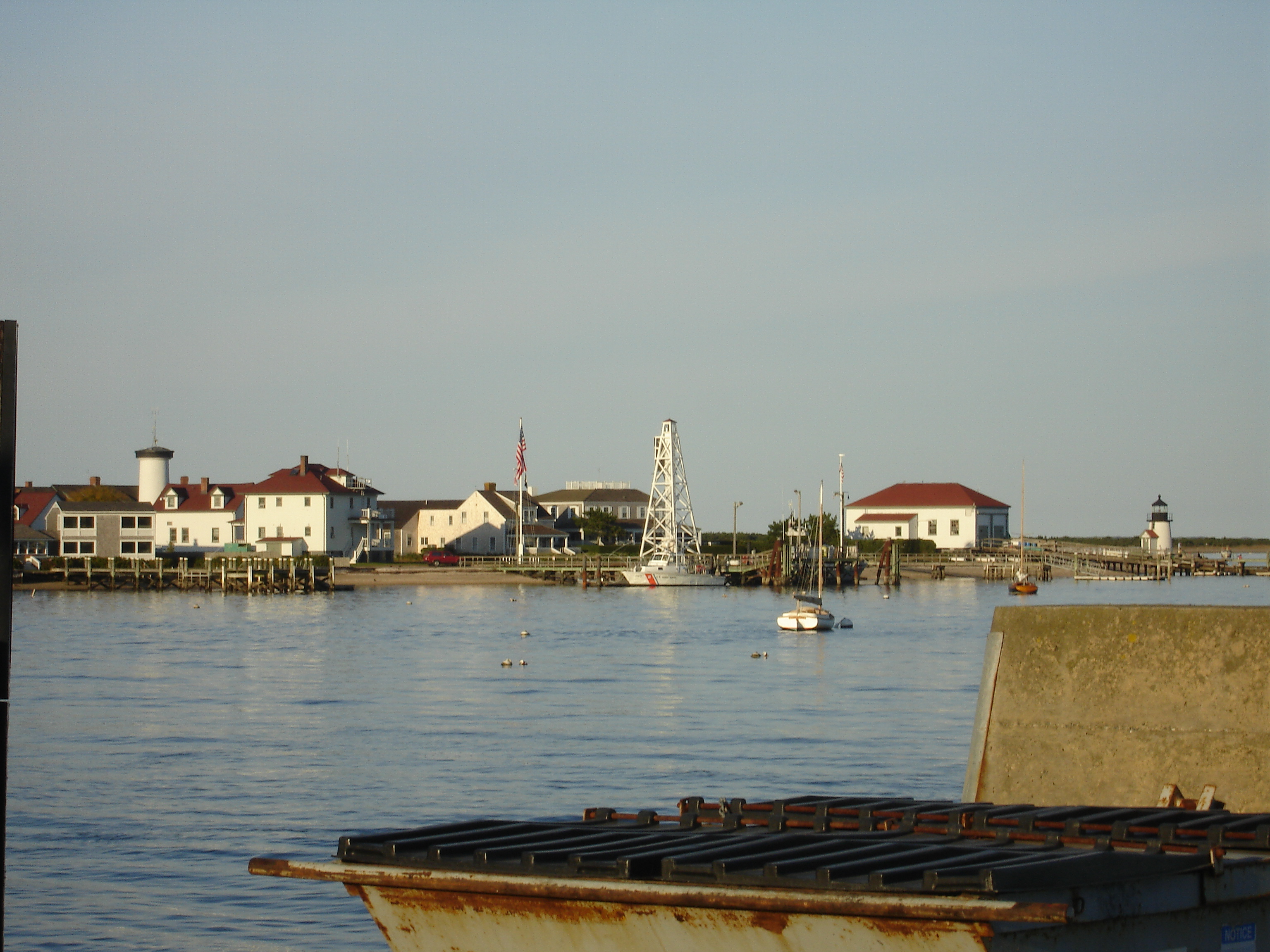
- A view of the station from Nantucket Harbor

Site information
- Type: Coast Guard Station
- Owner: United States Coast Guard
- Open to the public: Yes

Location
- Coordinates: 41°17′21″N 70°5′30″W

Site history
- In use: July 1939-Present

United States Coast Guard Station Brant Point is located on Brant Point, in Nantucket, Massachusetts. On November 25, 2021, President Joe Biden visited Coast Guard members during his annual Thanksgiving trip to the island.

== See also ==
- List of military installations in Massachusetts
