= Camp Prospect Hill =

Coordinates: 42.38°N 71.09°W

Camp Prospect Hill was an American Civil War training camp that existed in 1861 in Somerville, Massachusetts. It was located on Prospect Hill in the Union Square neighborhood of Somerville, on the site of an American Revolutionary War fort. Company E of the 39th Massachusetts Volunteer Infantry Regiment trained there.

== See also ==
- List of military installations in Massachusetts
