= United States Coast Guard Buoy Depot, South Weymouth =

Coordinates: 42°9′12.73″N 70°57′4.66″W

United States Coast Guard Buoy Depot, South Weymouth is a United States Coast Guard facility located in Weymouth, Massachusetts. It is located to the southeast of the South Weymouth MBTA station and west of the former Naval Air Station South Weymouth.

== See also ==
- List of military installations in Massachusetts
