= Old Stone Fort (Massachusetts) =

Coordinates: 42°39′38.57″N 70°36′52″W

Old Stone Fort was a fort that existed in 1814 in Rockport, Massachusetts during the War of 1812. It was also known as Sea Fensibles Barrack during its existence. Today, a plaque is located on the Transit Tower, which was built on the site of the fort. Stones from the former fort were used in the construction of the harbor's breakwater.

== See also ==
- List of military installations in Massachusetts
