= Scituate Proving Ground =

Coordinates: 42°12′37.92″N 70°44′13.21″W

Scituate Proving Ground was a proving ground of the United States Army located in Scituate, Massachusetts. It became operational in 1918, when 115.25 acres were purchased between June and July. In November 1919 the site was declared excess, and it was used as a storing ground until June 1921. During its brief period of operation it was intended to proof fire the production of 155mm and 240mm howitzer carriages that were built elsewhere in Massachusetts. The proving grounds in Scituate did not have the ability to test the projectiles or fuses, so it was used to test cartridge cases, primer and powder. The grounds had its own heating and power plants as well as a garrison of 10 officers and 130 enlisted men. Recently, the site was used for housing, although former structures dating from the use of the grounds could be seen up until 2018, when the Toll Brothers began to develop the site. Toll Brothers plans to build "Seaside at Scituate", which will have 142 townhouses in a condo setting for people 55 years and older when completed.

== See also ==
- List of military installations in Massachusetts
