= Naval Outlying Landing Field Mansfield =

Naval Outlying Landing Field Mansfield was a Naval Outlying Landing Field located in Mansfield, Massachusetts operational from 1942 to 1945. It existed as an outlying field of Naval Air Station Squantum and was used by student pilots to gain flight experience on its two 2,500 foot turf runways. Today, the field operates as Mansfield Municipal Airport.

== See also ==
- List of military installations in Massachusetts
