= Sandy Neck Bomb Target Range =

- Part of United States Navy
- Barnstable, Massachusetts

Site information
- Type: Range
- Owner: Barnstable, Massachusetts
- Controlled by: Town of Barnstable
- Open to the public: Yes

Location
- Coordinates: 41°43′53.14″N 70°19′2.12″W.

Site history
- In use: 1944-1946

The Sandy Neck Bomb Target Range was a former naval bomb range for fleet arm naval aviators, and located on Sandy Neck, in Barnstable, Massachusetts.

== History ==
The Sandy Neck Bomb Target Range was used from 1944 to 1946 when the Navy cancelled its leases. It was used for the practice of dive bombing for carrier aircraft. While it was in operation, it was part of the nearby Naval Air Station Quonset Point. In 1946, after the war had ended and cruise missile technology was being developed, the Navy cancelled its lease on the range from the town. To the west of the site along the northern beach there was also an anti-tank mine area.

== Environmental cleanup ==
During the cleanup of the site in the mid-1990s, ordnance such the Mark 23 practice bomb was discovered at the site.

== See also ==
- List of military installations in Massachusetts
