= George H. Crosman United States Army Reserve Center =

US Army facility

Coordinates: 41°54′55.17″N 71°6′32.73″W

The George H. Crosman United States Army Reserve Center is a United States Army Reserve facility located in Taunton, Massachusetts. In 2007, the center was the location of a spate of Humvee thefts, in which thieves stole the vehicles and joyrode on nearby railroad tracks. The George H. Crosman United States Army Reserve Center Heliport was once located on the site of the facility.

== See also ==
- List of military installations in Massachusetts
