= Fort Juniper =

Coordinates: 42°32′1.15″N 70°51′54.50″W

Fort Juniper was a fort that existed from 1775 to 1776 in Salem, Massachusetts during the American Revolutionary War. It was also known as Fort Number One during its existence.

== See also ==
- List of military installations in Massachusetts
