= Navy and Marine Corps Reserve Center, Lawrence =

Naval and Marine Corps Reserve Center, Lawrence is a former United States Navy and Marine Corps reserve center located in Lawrence, Massachusetts. It was closed per the recommendations of the 1995 Base Realignment and Closure Commission, and consolidated to Naval Reserve Center, Quincy.

== See also ==
- List of military installations in Massachusetts
