= Lowell Ordnance Plant =

Small arms plant in Massachusetts

Coordinates: 42°36′42.67″N 71°17′29.67″W

The Lowell Ordnance Plant was a small arms plant located on the border of Lowell, Billerica, and Tewksbury, Massachusetts that operated under contract from the Remington Arms Company between 1942 and 1943. It mostly produced .50 caliber machine gun ammo. A small run of .30 caliber machine gun ammo was also manufactured for less than a year.

The site has been identified as contaminated and has been undergoing remediation since the mid-1980s. It is currently being used as an industrial park.

The largest building in the industrial park was demolished during Summer 2020, to facilitate construction of a proposed Home Depot e-commerce warehouse.

== See also ==
- List of military installations in Massachusetts
