= United States Naval Mine Test Facility, Provincetown =

Coordinates: 42°3′5.45″N 70°11′6.15″W

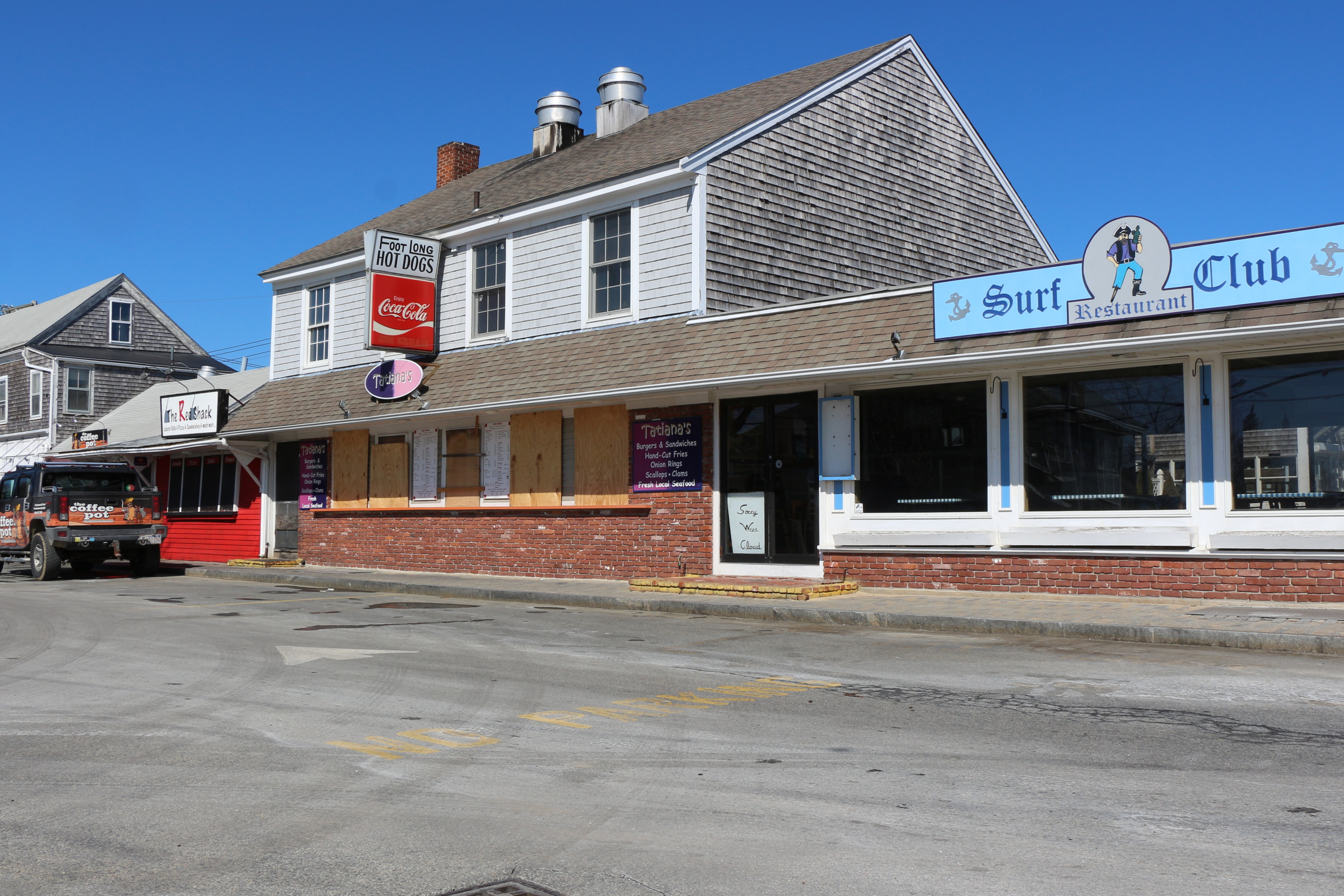
The Surf Club, formerly part of the United States Naval Mine Test Facility, Provincetown.

United States Naval Mine Test Facility, Provincetown was a testing facility of the United States Navy located in Provincetown, Massachusetts. It was active from 1944 to 1946. After its closure, it was redeveloped into many private uses, including the Provincetown Vocational School.

== See also ==
- List of military installations in Massachusetts
