= Coast Guard Station Provincetown =

US Coast Guard station in Massachusetts

- Part of 1st District
- Provincetown, Massachusetts
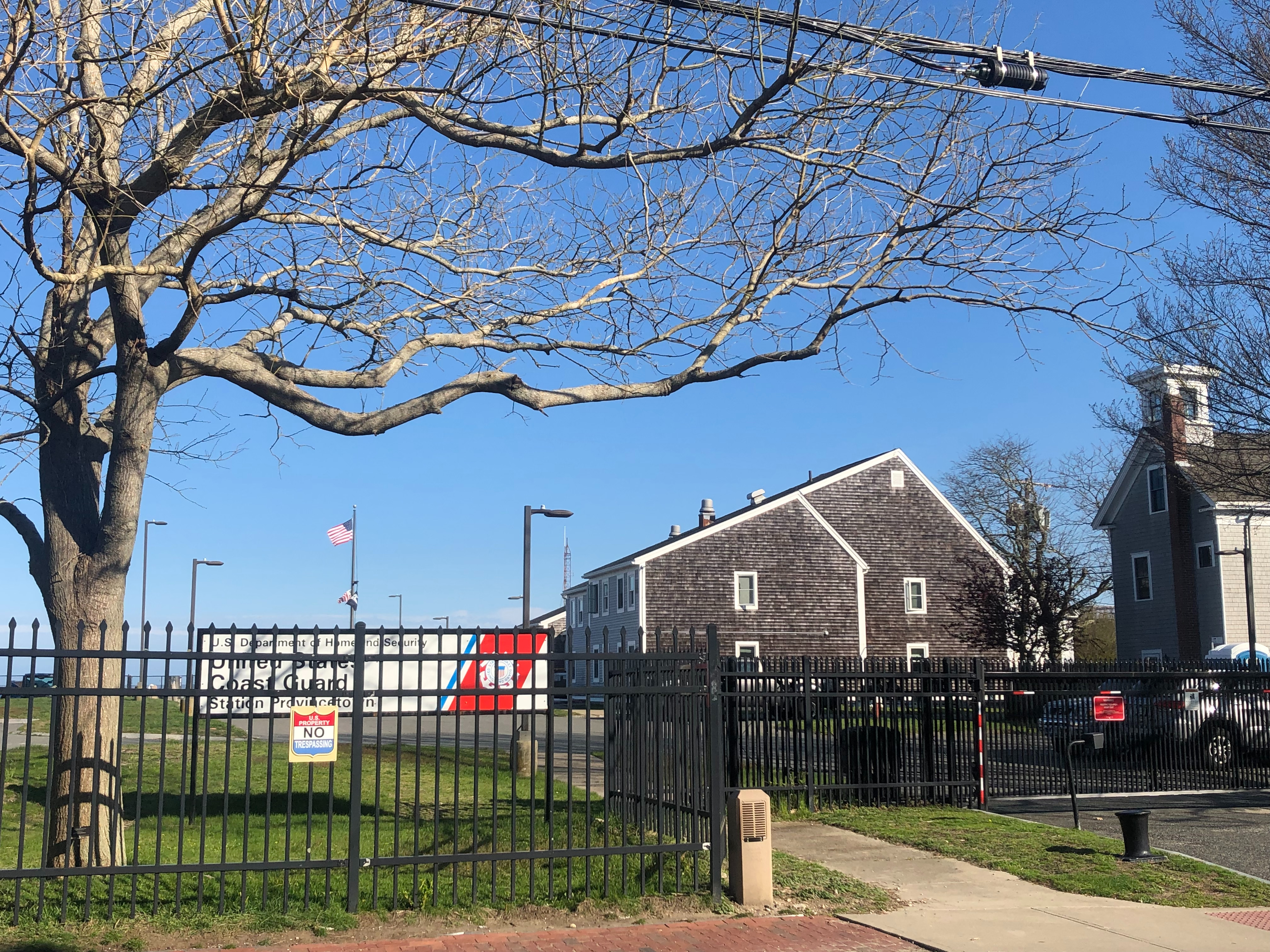
- Coast Guard Station in Provincetown

Site information
- Type: Coast Guard Station
- Owner: United States Coast Guard
- Open to the public: Yes

Location
- Coordinates: 42°2′42.64″N 70°11′29.70″W

Site history
- In use: ???-Present
- Events: blizzard of 78

Garrison information
- Current commander: MCPO David P. Bichrest

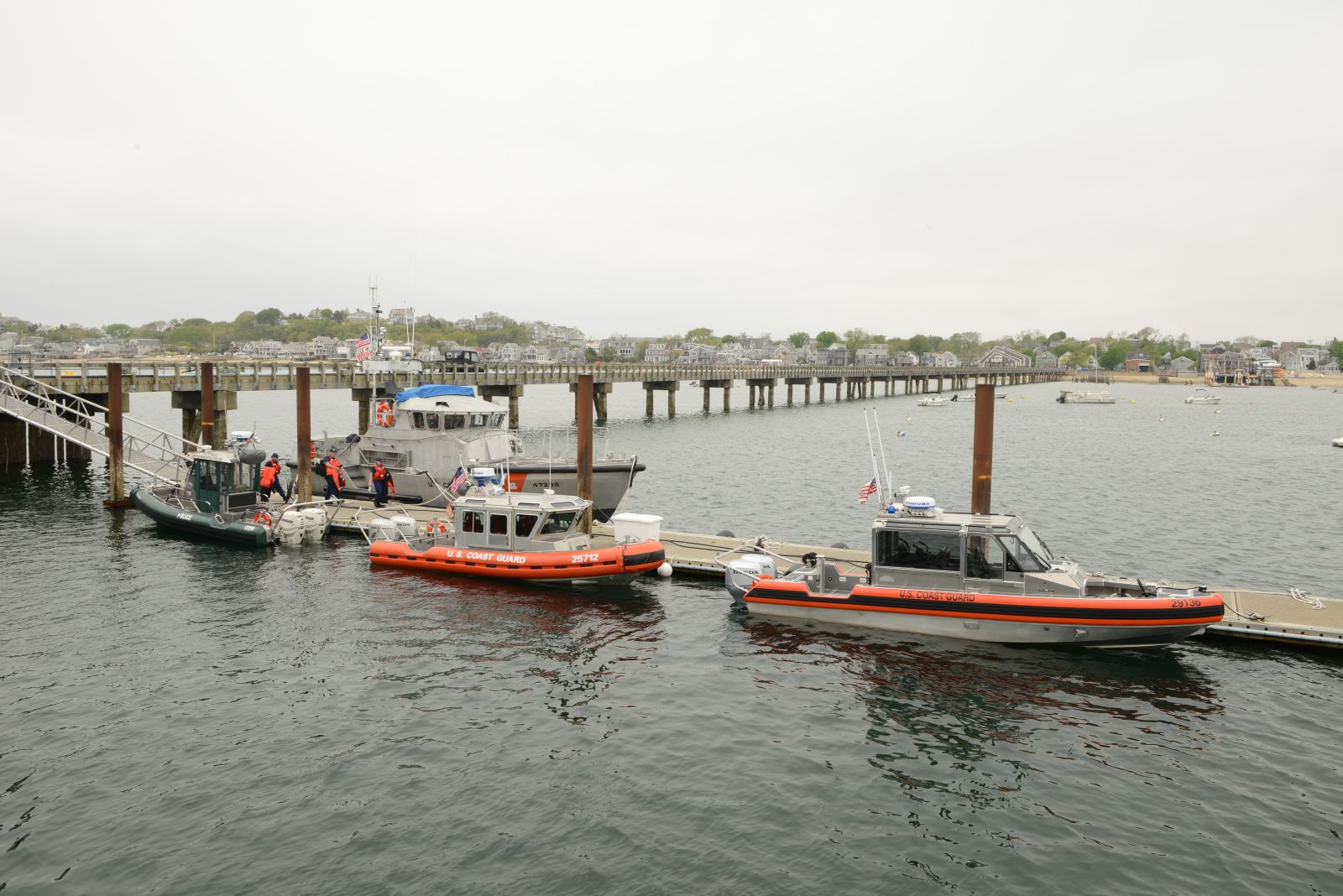
Coast Guard Station Provincetown, Massachusetts, crewmembers prepare to get underway for a harbor patrol May 22, 2013. Station Provincetown was one of the first Coast Guard units in the 1st Coast Guard District to receive the new 29-foot Response Boat-Small.

United States Coast Guard Station Provincetown is a United States Coast Guard station located in Provincetown, Massachusetts.

The station is a sub-unit of Sector Southeast New England.

== See also ==
- List of military installations in Massachusetts
