= Coast Guard Station Menemsha =

US Coast Guard station in Massachusetts

U. S. Coast Guard Station Menemsha
- Part of 1st Coast Guard District, Sector Southeastern New England
- Menemsha, Massachusetts

Site information
- Type: Coast Guard Motor Lifeboat Station, Heavy Weather Station.
- Owner: United States Coast Guard
- Open to the public: No

Location
- Coordinates: 41°21′00″N 70°45′51″W

Site history
- In use: 1952-Present

Garrison information
- Current commander: Senior Chief (BM) Justin Longval, USCG
- Occupants: 25

United States Coast Guard Station Menemsha is a United States Coast Guard station located in Menemsha, Massachusetts, within the town of Chilmark. Primarily a Search and Rescue unit, other activities include Law Enforcement in commercial fisheries and recreational boating safety. The unit is classified as a Heavy Weather Station, capable of operating in up to 20 foot seas and 50 knots wind.

The United States Life-Saving Service (a forerunner to the Coast Guard) established a station at Gay Head in 1895. In 1952, the Coast Guard station located at Cuttyhunk was moved by barge to Menemsha, replacing the Gay Head station. The station was not renamed Menemsha, however, until 1974.

In July 2010, a fire destroyed the boat house as well as damaged other buildings and the dock at the station.

In April 2015 a new boathouse was opened on the footprint of the one destroyed in July 2010.

== See also ==
- List of military installations in Massachusetts
