= Coast Guard Base Cape Cod =

US Coast Guard base in Massachusetts

Coordinates: 41.6654°N 70.5253°W

United States Coast Guard Base Cape Cod is a United States Coast Guard base located in Sandwich, Massachusetts. It was founded in August 2014 as the single point for Deputy Commandant for Mission Support for the United States Coast Guard First District.

== See also ==
- List of military installations in Massachusetts
