= Coast Guard Station Gloucester =

US Coast Guard station in Massachusetts

Coast Guard Station Gloucester
- Part of 1st District
- Gloucester, Massachusetts
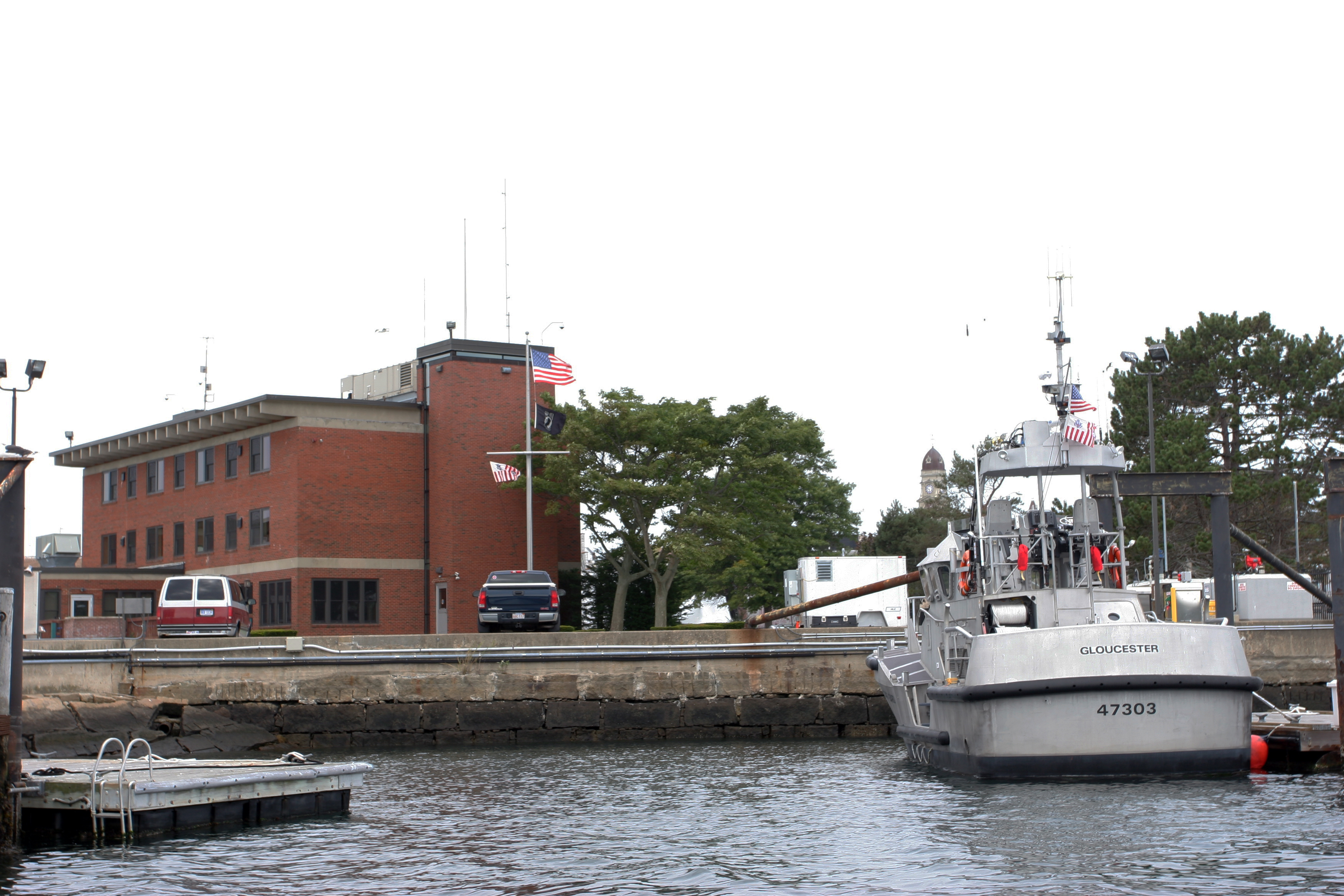

Site information
- Type: Coast Guard Station
- Owner: United States Coast Guard
- Open to the public: Yes

Location
- Coordinates: 42°36′37″N 70°39′36″W

Site history
- Built: 1977
- In use: 1977–present
- Events: Blizzard of 1978

Garrison information
- Current commander: Kevin Morgan

United States Coast Guard Station Gloucester is a United States Coast Guard station located in Gloucester, Massachusetts. It is located on Harbor Loop on the Mainland. The first successful US Coast Guard Air Station was CGAS Ten Pound Island in Gloucester Harbor, which operated from 1925 to 1935.

The station has three assets: two 47′ MLB and an RBS2. In order to respond to "SAR" search and rescue in heavy weather the 47 MLB is utilized. Gloucester's area of responsibility also includes narrow rivers and harbors, which the RBS is utilized over the 47 to gain entry into shallow waters.

Many books and movies have revolved around the station, most notably the non-fiction book 10 Hours Until Dawn and the story of Andrea Gail and her crew which was the basis of the 1997 book The Perfect Storm by Sebastian Junger, and the 2000 film.

== See also ==
- The Perfect Storm (book)
- The Perfect Storm (film)
- 1991 Halloween blizzard
- List of military installations in Massachusetts
