= Coast Guard Station Merrimack River =

US Coast Guard station in Massachusetts

- Part of 1st District
- Newburyport, Massachusetts
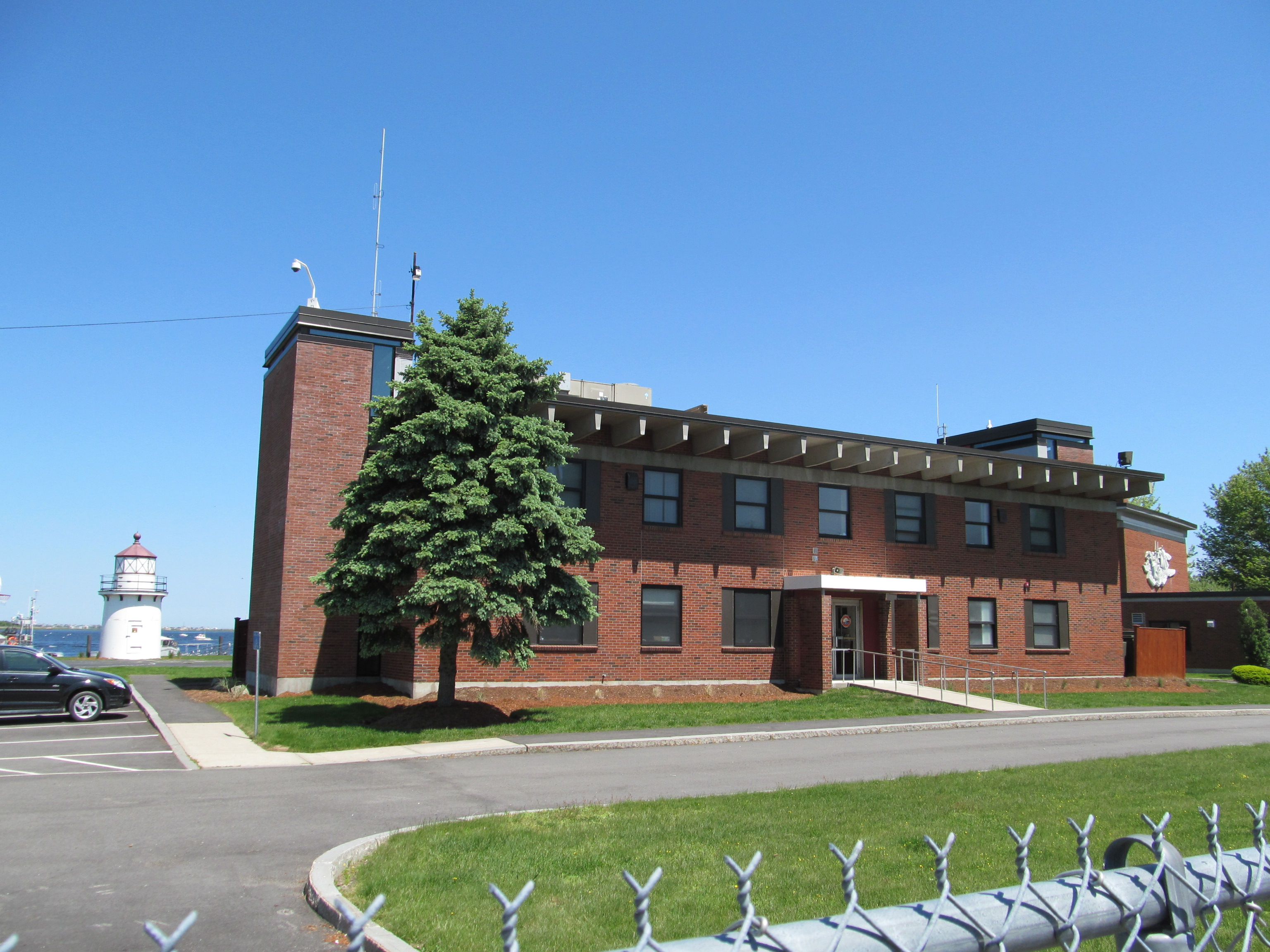
- Coast Guard Station Merrimack River

Site information
- Type: Coast Guard Station
- Owner: United States Coast Guard
- Controlled by: U.S. Coast Guard Sector Boston
- Open to the public: On limited occasions
- Condition: Operational

Location
- Coordinates: 42°48′37.68″N 70°51′53.48″W

Site history
- In use: 04 August 1973-Present

United States Coast Guard Station Merrimack River is a United States Coast Guard station located in Newburyport, Massachusetts. It is one of the 20 surf stations in the Coast Guard. Its primary missions include search and rescue and law enforcement.

The stations current complement is roughly 30 personnel, two 47-foot Motor lifeboats, and a 29-foot response boat-small.

As of 2021, the station is commanded by a Master Chief Boatswains Mate, and encompasses solely enlisted personnel. It is staffed at all times by a search and rescue/law enforcement team that is capable of responding to maritime emergencies in nearly all weather conditions.

== See also ==
- List of military installations in Massachusetts
