= Moore Army Airfield =

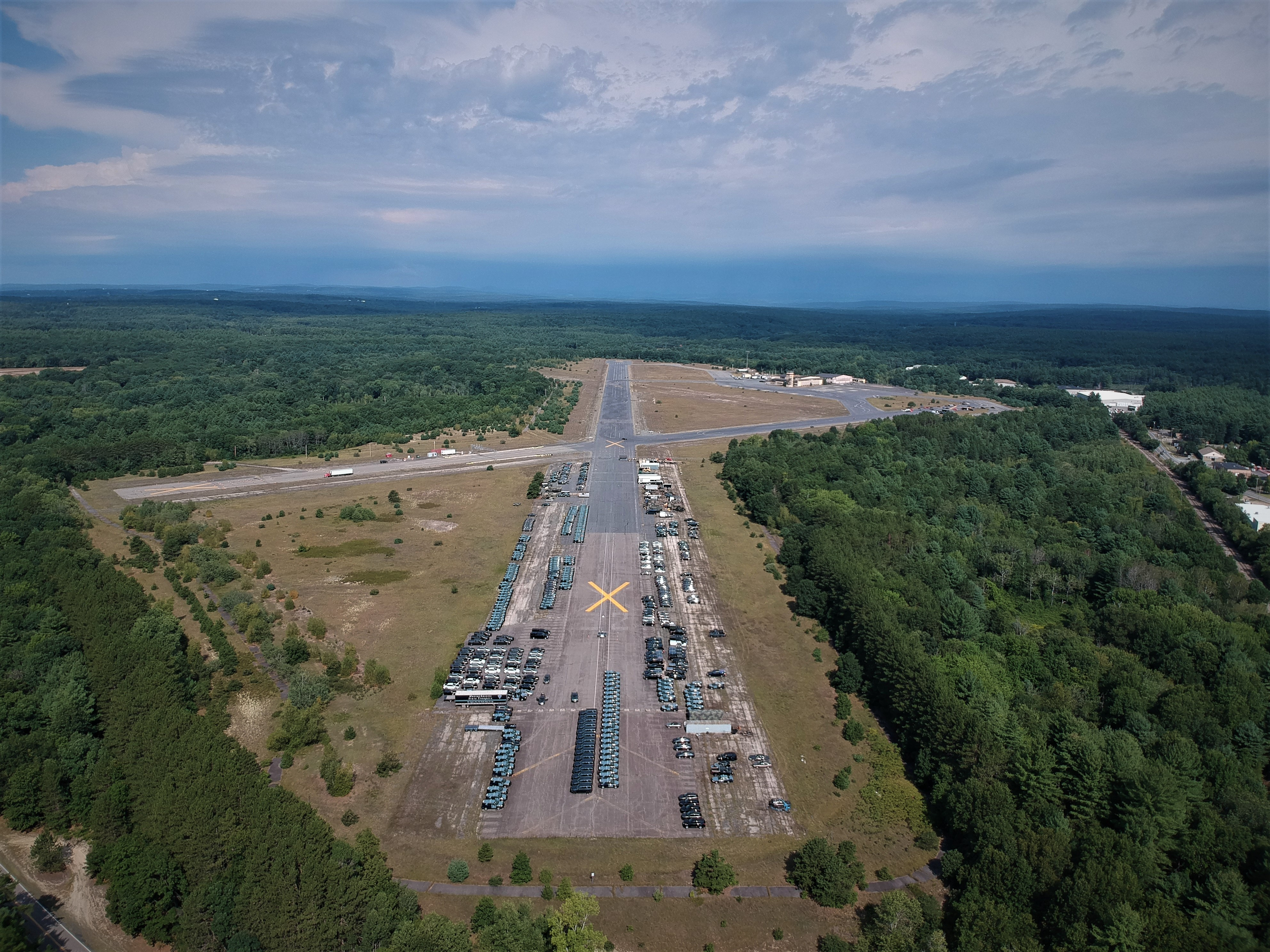
- Moore Army Airfield August 2020
- IATA: ~~AYE~~; ICAO: ~~KAYE~~; FAA LID: ~~AYE~~

Summary
- Airport type: Army Airfield, Defunct
- Operator: United States Army
- Location: Fort Devens, Ayer / Shirley, Massachusetts
- Built: 1929
- In use: 1929–1995
- Occupants: Army, Navy
- Elevation AMSL: 256 ft (78 m)
- Coordinates: 42°34′18″N 071°36′12″W
- Interactive map of Moore Army Airfield

Runways
Direction	Length		Surface
Direction	ft	m	Surface
~~14/32~~	4,642	1,415	~~Asphalt~~ (Closed)
~~2/20~~	2,971	905	~~Asphalt~~ (Closed)
~~9/27~~	~~2,691~~	819	~~Asphalt~~ (Closed)
~~13/31~~	150	46	~~Asphalt~~ (Closed)
~~18/36~~	150	46	~~Asphalt~~ (Closed)

Moore Army Airfield is a former airfield located in Fort Devens, Massachusetts. It was closed following the closure of the fort in 1995. It is named for Ayer native Chief Warrant Officer 2 Douglas Moore. It was the only Army Airfield named for someone killed in the Vietnam War. It is currently used for racing and State Police driver training.

== History ==
=== Beginnings ===
The earliest information concerning the construction of the airfield dates to 1 July 1926. It was originally known as Ayer (Camp Devens) Emergency Field. The sod airfield's dimensions were: 2,300 by 850 feet (700 m × 260 m). It also ran northwest/southeast. Camp Devens Airfield, as it was called later, was operated by the Army. A second runway was established the following year. Approximate dimensions were said to be 2,325 by 1,560 feet (709 m × 475 m). In 1934, it was marked as an auxiliary airfield to the Navy.

=== World War II ===
Naval Auxiliary Air Facility Ayer

When the nearby fort was expanded in 1940, the airport supposedly "gained" its own airfield. It was described as having a 5,200-foot (1,600 m) runway. In 1944, the army withdrew from the airfield and it became known as Naval Auxiliary Air Facility Ayer, which supported training operations at Squantum Naval Air Station. Carrier Air Groups 4 and 83 were at Ayer in 1944. The nearby Naval Auxiliary Air Facility Beverly was used as a bounce field.

=== Postwar years ===
The Navy discontinued their use of Naval Air Station Ayer for unknown reasons between the years of 1944–1946. Fort Devens was deactivated as part of demobilization, in 1946, but it was reopened in 1948. By 1954, it was known as Ayer Army Airfield. Then it was renamed Fort Devens Army Airfield between 1954 and 1959. It had three operating runways but they were used intermittently on and off throughout the years. The longest runway was listed in 1960 as being 3,745 feet (not including overrun). In the 1970s it got an upgraded control tower and it was used for helicopter operations. The air traffic controllers worked in conjunction with their counterparts at the nearby Hanscom Air Force Base. Around 1976 the field was renamed Moore Army Airfield.

== Closure and redevelopment ==
The field was closed around 1995 after the Army left. It is now a State Police driver training facility on week days. On weekends the runways are currently the largest and only centrally located venue in southern New England for SCCA Solo style autocross competitions. Several other clubs also use the runways for similar competitions. There is now talk of putting an industrial park over the runways of Moore Army Airfield.

== Groups Hosted ==
- 152nd Observation Squadron (1941–1943)
- Carrier Air Group 4
- Carrier Air Group 83
- 10th Special Forces Group (Minus the First Battalion) (1968–1995)

== Aircraft Hosted ==
- Aeronca L-16
- R-16/H-16 - Piasecki
- North American BC-1
- North American O-47
- O-49
- O-52 Owl
- O-58
- HU-21 Workhorse/Shawnee
- U-10D Super Courier
- UH-1 Huey
- C-45 Expeditor
- C-130 Hercules
- C-12 Huron
- UH-60 Blackhawk
- U-10 Helio courier
- B-17 Flying Fortress

== Accidents and incidents ==
=== 2003 Emergency Landing ===
In the morning hours of February 10, 2004, a single-engine Diamond DA20 Katana N-303EC suffered an in-flight engine-loss during an instructional flight. The aircraft landed at the closed airport with no additional damage or injuries.

== See also ==
- List of military installations in Massachusetts
