= LORAN-C transmitter Nantucket =

LORAN-C transmitter at Siasconset, Massachusetts, United States

Nantucket LORAN-A
- Interactive map of the Nantucket LORAN-A area

General information
- Status: Demolished
- Type: Mast radiator insulated against ground
- Location: Siasconset, Massachusetts
- Coordinates: 41°15′12.40″N 69°58′38.76″W
- Completed: 1943
- Demolished: 1981

Design and construction
- Main contractor: US Coast Guard

Nantucket LORAN-C Mast
- Interactive map of the Nantucket LORAN-C Mast area

General information
- Status: Demolished
- Type: Mast radiator insulated against ground
- Location: Siasconset, Massachusetts
- Coordinates: 41°15′12.40″N 69°58′38.76″W
- Completed: 1962
- Closed: 2010
- Demolished: May 2013

Height
- Height: 625 ft (190.50 m)

Design and construction
- Architects: Construction Detachment, B
- Main contractor: US Coast Guard

Nantucket LORAN-C transmitter was a LORAN-C transmitter at Siasconset, Massachusetts. It was built in 1963 with a 625 ft tall mast radiator. It operated in conjunction with the LORAN-A station on Nantucket from 1963 to 1981. It was closed in 2010 when the United States discontinued the Loran system, and officially decommissioned on September 10. The tower was taken down in May 2013.

== Commanders ==
=== LORAN A ===
- Commanding Officer: Lieutenant, Junior Grade W P Clark 8/1943-44
- Officer-in-Charge: Chief Electronics Technician Jack Cromwell 1957

=== LORAN A/C ===
- 1st Commanding Officer: "Red" Fredericks 1962-63
- Commanding Officer: Lieutenant Ostrum 1963-64
- Commanding Officer: Lieutenant Wesemen 1970-73
- Commanding Officer: Lieutenant, Junior Grade Charles T. Winfrey 1973-76
- Commanding Officer: Lieutenant Jack Ryan 1978-80
- Commanding Officer: Lieutenant John W Simpson 1980-81

=== LORAN C ===
- Commanding Officer: Lieutenant Brooke Winter 1981-82
- Commanding Officer: Commissioned Warrant Officer Joseph Puntino 1982-84
- Commanding Officer: Commissioned Warrant Officer David Fronzuto 1984-86
- 1st Officer-in-Charge: Chief Electronics Technician Bill Dietz 1986-87
- Officer-in-Charge: Chief Electronics Technician Joe Jester 1987-90
- Officer-in-Charge: Chief Electronics Technician John Dreger 2002–04
- Officer-in-Charge: Chief Electronics Technician Martin Hazeltine 2004-08
- Officer-in-Charge: Chief Electronics Technician Shane Hyde 2008-10

== See also ==
- List of masts
- List of military installations in Massachusetts
