= Nantucket (CDP), Massachusetts =

Nantucket, Massachusetts
- Census-designated place
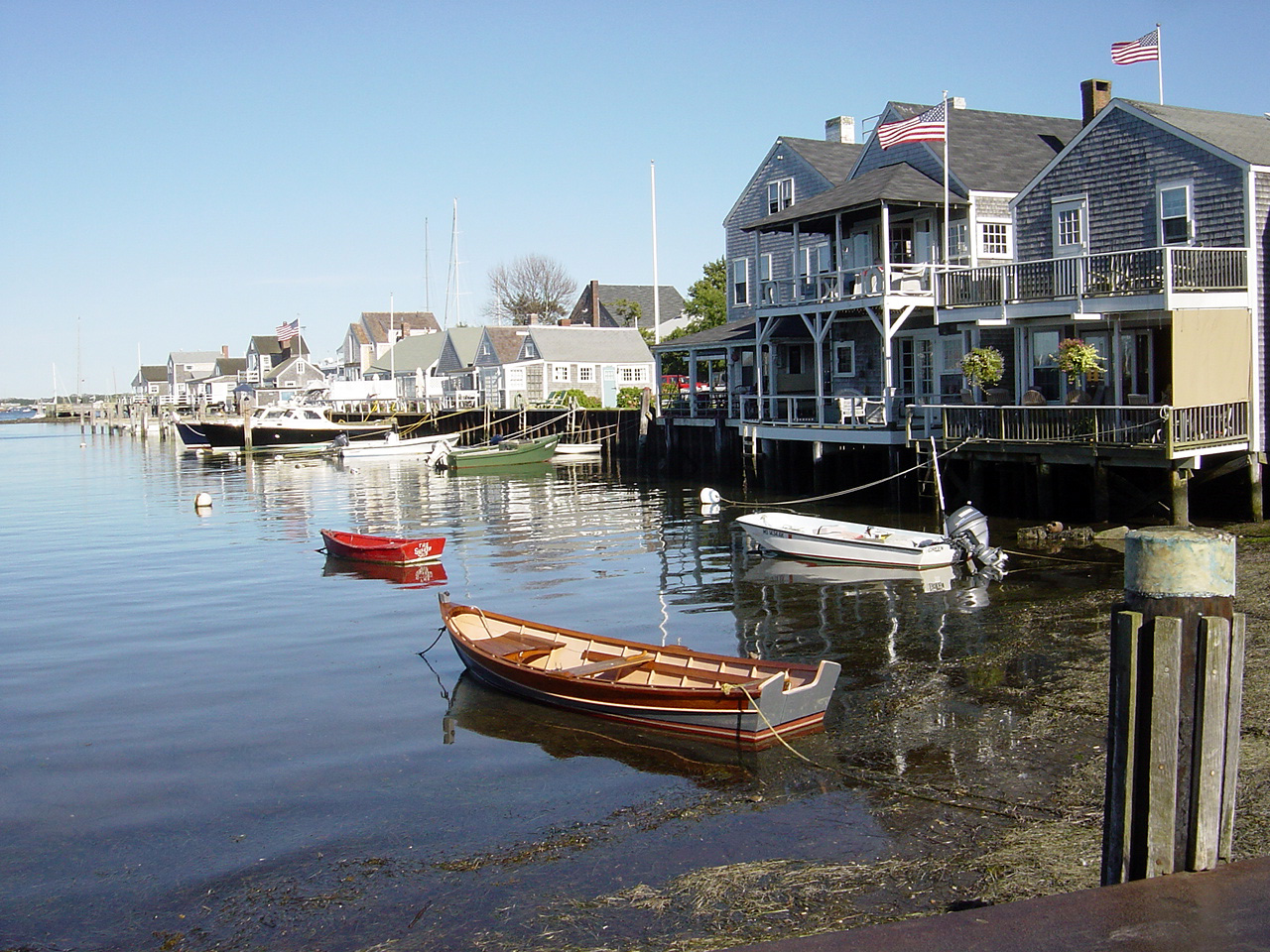
- Nantucket

- Location in Nantucket County and the state of Massachusetts.
- Coordinates: 41°16′53″N 70°6′2″W
- Country: United States
- State: Massachusetts

Area
  - Total: 6.54 sq mi (16.95 km^{2})
  - Land: 5.82 sq mi (15.08 km^{2})
  - Water: 0.72 sq mi (1.87 km^{2})
- Elevation: 43 ft (13 m)

Population (2020)
  - Total: 10,166
  - Density: 1,745.7/sq mi (674.03/km^{2})
- Time zone: UTC-5 (Eastern (EST))
  - Summer (DST): UTC-4 (EDT)
- ZIP Code: 02554
- Area code: 508
- FIPS code: 25-43755
- GNIS feature ID: 0616716

Nantucket is a census-designated place (CDP) in the town of Nantucket in Nantucket County, Massachusetts, United States. The population was 10,166 at the 2020 census.

== Geography ==
Nantucket is located at 41°16′53″N 70°6′1″W (41.28152, -70.100425).

According to the United States Census Bureau, the CDP has a total area of 10.0 km^{2} (3.9 mi^{2}). 6.4 km^{2} (2.5 mi^{2}) of it is land and 3.7 km^{2} (1.4 mi^{2}) of it (36.60%) is water.

== Demographics ==
Historical population
Census	Pop.	Note	%±
2020	10,166		—
U.S. Decennial Census

As of the census of 2000, there were 3,830 people, 1,525 households, and 754 families residing in the CDP. The population density was 601.1/km^{2} (1,555.8/mi^{2}). There were 3,650 housing units at an average density of 572.9/km^{2} (1,482.7/mi^{2}). The racial makeup of the CDP was 82.61% White, 12.32% Black or African American, 0.03% Native American, 0.91% Asian, 1.57% from other races, and 2.56% from two or more races. Hispanic or Latino of any race were 1.75% of the population.

There were 1,525 households, out of which 19.0% had children under the age of 18 living with them, 39.5% were married couples living together, 7.5% had a female householder with no husband present, and 50.5% were non-families. 35.7% of all households were made up of individuals, and 11.7% had someone living alone who was 65 years of age or older. The average household size was 2.19 and the average family size was 2.78.

In the CDP, the population was spread out, with 14.0% under the age of 18, 8.5% from 18 to 24, 42.0% from 25 to 44, 22.0% from 45 to 64, and 13.5% who were 65 years of age or older. The median age was 38 years. For every 100 females, there were 101.3 males. For every 100 females age 18 and over, there were 100.2 males.

The median income for a household in the CDP was $52,893, and the median income for a family was $64,239. Males had a median income of $40,410 versus $29,031 for females. The per capita income for the CDP was $29,497. About 1.9% of families and 9.1% of the population were below the poverty line, including 2.2% of those under age 18 and 5.4% of those age 65 or over.
