= Naval Auxiliary Air Facility Hyannis =

Former military airport in Cape Cod, Massachusetts, United States (1942–1945)

- Barnstable, Massachusetts in United States

Site information
- Owner: United States Department of Defense
- Operator: United States Navy
- Open to the public: No

Location
- Coordinates: 41°40′10″N 70°16′49″W

Site history
- Built: 1942
- In use: 1945
- Fate: Turned over to civilian use
- Battles/wars: World War II

Airfield information
- Elevation: 18 metres (59 ft) AMSL
Runways
| Direction | Length and surface |
|---|---|
| 6/24 | 1,219 metres (3,999 ft) Asphalt |
| 9/27 | 1,219 metres (3,999 ft) Asphalt |
| 15/33 | 1,219 metres (3,999 ft) Asphalt |

Naval Auxiliary Air Facility Hyannis was a United States Navy facility located in Hyannis, Massachusetts operational from 1942 to 1945. It existed as an auxiliary air facility of Naval Air Station Quonset Point.

== History ==
From 1942 to 1943, the facility was operated by the United States Army Air Forces as Hyannis Army Air Field and operated Douglas B-18 Bolo aircraft on anti-submarine patrols under the operational control of Westover Field. In 1943. the United States Navy took control of the facility and trained many aviators.

== Redevelopment ==
Today, the field operates as Barnstable Municipal Airport.

== See also ==
- List of military installations in Massachusetts
