= Lovell General Hospital (Massachusetts) =

Military hospital in Massachusetts, US

Lovell General Hospital East
- United States Army
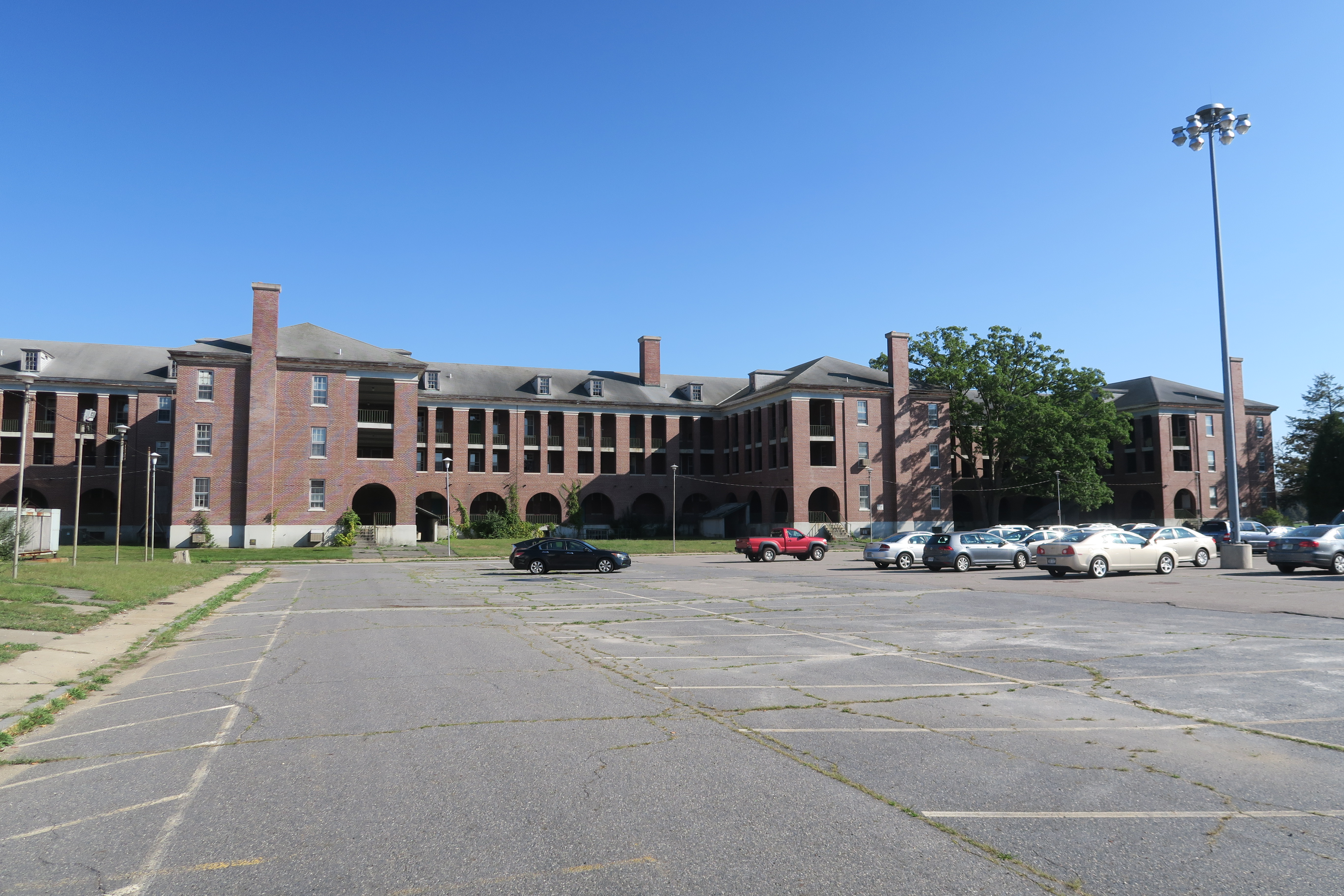
- Knox Hall on Vicksburg Square

Geography
- Location: Devens, Massachusetts, United States
- Coordinates: 42°32′52.64″N 71°36′41.33″W

Organization
- Type: Military

Links
- Lists: Hospitals in Massachusetts

Lovell General Hospital was a military hospital located at the former Fort Devens in Devens, Massachusetts, U.S. It was named after the first Surgeon General of the United States Army, Joseph Lovell. Split into three campuses, the East campus buildings are the only ones still standing, the North and South campuses having been demolished.

== LGH East ==
Lovell General Hospital East is the only section of the hospital still standing as of 2019, most recently used as a part of the United States Army Intelligence School
