= Coast Guard Station Point Allerton =

US Coast Guard station in Massachusetts

- Part of 1st District
- Hull, Massachusetts

Site information
- Type: Coast Guard Station
- Owner: United States Coast Guard
- Open to the public: Yes

Location
- Coordinates: 42°18′10.14″N 70°54′48.14″W

Site history
- In use: 1889-Present
- Events: Portland Gale of 1898

United States Coast Guard Station Point Allerton is a United States Coast Guard station located in Hull, Massachusetts.

The station is a sub-unit of Sector Boston. It traces its roots back to the U.S. Lifesaving Station and the Massachusetts Humane Society. Its assets include the Motor Life Boat (MLB), the Coast Guard's 47-foot (14 m) primary heavy-weather boat used for search and rescue as well as law enforcement and homeland security, and Response Boat – Small (RB-S), a 29-foot (8.8 m) high-speed boat, for a variety of missions, including search and rescue, port security and law enforcement duties.

== Gale of 1898 ==
Portland Gale was an intense storm causing many vessels in the area at anchor, and transiting in and out of Boston to be in distress. Point Allerton responded to many of these distressed vessels and thus saved many lives under the lead of Joshua James (1826–1902), Hull's most famous lifesaver, who became the first Keeper of the Pt. Allerton U.S. Life Saving Station, when it opened in 1889.

Joshua James is honored every year at his grave-site on May 23, Joshua James Day, by the Hull Life-Saving Museum and the Point Allerton Station. His house built in 1850 still stands in Hull, Massachusetts and is marked as having been his home. The Point Allerton station also still stands, but is no longer in use. The Point Allerton station now houses the Hull Life-Saving Museum. In 2003, the Coast Guard created the Joshua James Award to honor the Coast Guard personnel with the most seniority in rescue work and the highest record of achievement. USCGC James (WMSL-754), the fifth National Security Cutter, was named in honor of his life and dedication to saving lives.

== See also ==
- List of military installations in Massachusetts
