= Children's Island =

Island in the United States of America

Coordinates: 42°30′42″N 70°48′52″W

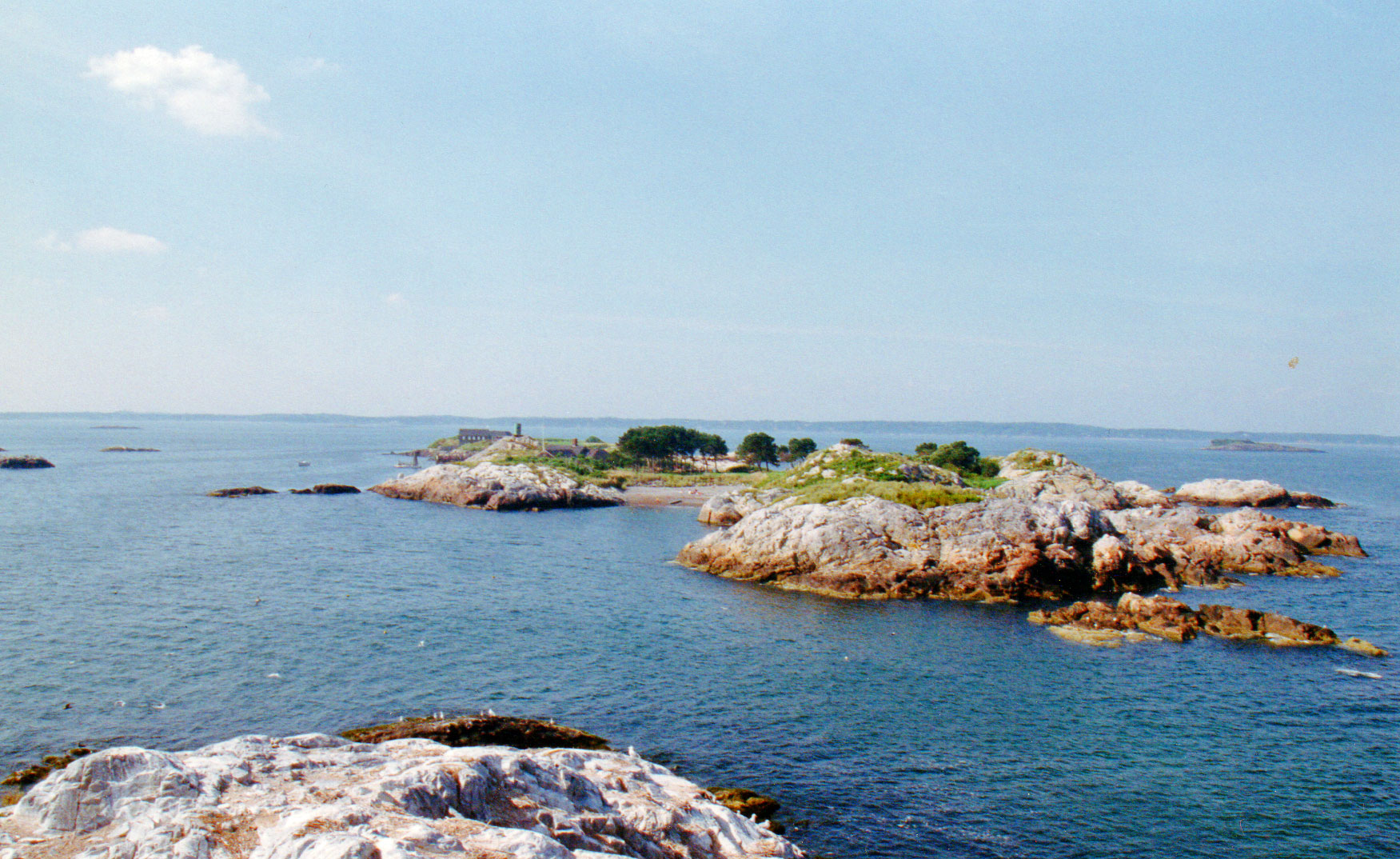
View of Children's Island from the top of Cormorant Rock

Children's Island, formerly known as "Cat Island" is a private island off Marblehead, Massachusetts, and is located within Salem Sound, Salem, Massachusetts. The YMCA of the North Shore has owned and operated a children's day camp on it since 1955. The first written record of the island was in 1655 when it was granted to Governor John Endecott. It was then bought and sold several times until around the Revolutionary War when the Essex hospital was built as a smallpox inoculation site. The hospital was burned down by townspeople of Marblehead. By the end of the 19th century, the Lowell island house was established as a summer resort. This was run for about 30 years before being converted into a sanitarium for sick and crippled children until 1946. The island then lay unused until bought by the YMCA and converted into a day camp.

== Name ==
The island has had numerous names including Catta, Cotta, Catt, Cat, Lowell, Pollard, and Children's; for most of history it was Cat Island. The origin of its name is that in the 18th century Catta was a corruption of Cotta and referred to an early Marblehead native named Robert Cotta, who used the land between 1635 and 1655 for the grazing of his sheep. Through subsequent misspellings and shortenings the name evolved into "Cat" Island. The island's name was officially changed from Cat Island to Children's Island by petition of the Marblehead/Swampscott YMCA in 1996.

== History ==
=== Colonial Times ===
Written reference to Children's Island first appeared in 1655 when "...the iland called Catta Iland...lying neere to Marble Head [sic]..." was granted to Governor John Endecott at his own request by the General Court of Massachusetts. Prior to 1655, it is likely that this and other local islands served as a source of smooth rocks for ship ballast, as a site for grazing animals, and as a source of timber for ship building. In June 1629, Reverend Francis Higginson notes "we passed the curious and difficult entrance into the large and spacious harbour of Naimkecke, [Salem] and as we passed along it was wonderful to behould so many islands replenished with thicke woods and high trees and many fayre green pastures [sic]." Although not specifically named by Higginson, Children's Island is presumably one of these wooded islands.

Upon the Governor's death in 1665 he gave to his wife "Catta Island, at Salem, which the Generall Court gave mee, during her life, & after her decease to my two sons, John & Zerobabel or to the longest liver of them.[sic]" In 1684, according to Zerubbabel's will "Cotta Island or any other land belonging to me which I have not otherwise bequeathed" was left to his five daughters. With the help of their brother Samuel, they "assign[ed] all that his Island...lying and being in ye Tounship of Marblehead commonly called and knoune by ye name of Catt Iland graunted to ye late worship John Endicott Esq [sic]...." to Richard Reade of Marblehead in March, 1687 for 16 pounds. How or why the name changed from Catta, to Cotta, and then to Catt Island is unexplained. The Reade family had financial difficulties and used the Island as a source of collateral for multiple loans. In February, 1738 the first reference to a house on the island is made when the Reades used it as collateral for a loan: "... Catt Island together with the house and woods thereon," though who built it and when is not known. In 1746, Samuel Reade received 75 pounds for "all one half of that island called and known by the name of Catt Island lying in the harbour of Marblehead with one half of the house thereon" from John Oliver. Finally, in 1761 due to an unsatisfied mortgage, Children's Island (Catt Island) was given up to the Wait family of Marblehead in whose possession it remained until 1773. On September 2, 1773, the Island was sold to four prominent men from Marblehead with the plan to build a smallpox hospital.

=== Essex Hospital ===
In June 1773, Marblehead was stricken by an epidemic of smallpox. Although some in the medical community argued in favor of inoculation of the disease, most people at the time were terrified of and vehemently opposed to the practice. In August 1773, a Marblehead town meeting was held to debate the construction of a public inoculation hospital on one of the nearby islands. The proposal was rejected, but the majority did agree to allow a private funding of a hospital as long as the Marblehead selectmen could regulate it. The owners of the future Essex Hospital were four popular Marblehead political figures: John Glover, Jonathan Glover (John Glover's brother), Azor Orne, and Elbridge Gerry; they purchased Children's Island (Catt Island) on September 2, 1773, although the idea remained contentious.

By early October, the hospital and a shifting-house were completed, and Dr. Hall Jackson from Portsmouth was hired as hospital superintendent, and Dr. Ananias Randall from Long Island as assistant physician. On October 19, the first group of patients arrived at the hospital and were inoculated, and since they were contagious after inoculation, remained on the island until November 9–11. On November 15, the second group of patients, numbering around 100, was inoculated at Essex Hospital, while the third group of patients was inoculated at the hospital in December 1773.

In early January 1774, a boatload of this third class attempted to land at Nick’s Cove, an unsanctioned landing area in Marblehead. Many townspeople were upset and a period of disorder and riots ensued. A few weeks later, four townsmen were caught stealing contaminated clothing from the island while attempting to smuggle them into Marblehead. Presumably, they were hoping to earn condemnation for the hospital by starting an outbreak of smallpox. The following morning, the four were tarred and feathered and paraded through Marblehead into Salem, a source of much entertainment to those witnessing the spectacle. Due to ongoing opposition, the hospital proprietors called for a town meeting on January 24 to ask the town to purchase the hospital and supplies, and to decide if the hospital should be kept open. Alternatively, they requested that if the hospital be closed that "a committee to cleanse the furniture, etc. in the so just and most satisfactory manner to the Town" be formed. The town refused to buy the hospital and supplies but did form a committee to oversee disinfection. On the following day, the three committee members and eight members of their family spent the next two days on the island cleaning and disinfecting, when on the second night they were suddenly awakened by fire. During the night, approximately 20 townspeople had sneaked onto the island and set the hospital on fire. Everyone escaped alive but all buildings and property were burned or destroyed. The owners sued for damages, but those events were quickly forgotten as thoughts turned toward revolution.

=== The Revolutionary War and War of 1812 ===
As one of the Intolerable Acts issued by the British in response to the Boston Tea Party, The Boston Port Act closed Boston Harbor on June 1, 1774. Subsequently, much of the ship traffic designated for Boston was diverted to Marblehead and Salem Harbors. Starting in late December, 1774 and for the next seven months British war ships, mostly HMS Fowey, HMS Lively, and HMS Merlin blockaded Marblehead and Salem Harbors. Children’s Island (at that time still known as Cat Island) served as a common anchorage site for these big ships, whose crews must have embarked on the island at times for ballast stones, wood, and water: "Captain [George] Montagu of the Fowey ... had moved from Cat Island to Bakers Island for water, which fell short at the former place ..." in January, 1776. In December 1775, three British ships paraded around Children's Island in war formation threatening to bombard Marblehead. After spending half a day in threatening display, they left without attacking. Most likely hemmed in by the rocky shores of Children's Island and the fort at Gale’s Head (later known as Fort Sewall), the British surmised they were easy targets.

On Monday, January 8, 1776, Ashley Bowen notes: "I find the Fowey's people have cut down all the trees from Cat Island." However, the Marblehead Register, a local newspaper of the time, has an entry of Dr. Story on January 7, 1776, "Trees on Cat Island cut down last night, suppose by the Merlin." Another reference notes: "1776, January 8 – The Merlin cut down the trees on Cat Island – so we hear no more of the Merlin. There was a clump of trees on the middle of the Island – the most conspicuous landmark on the coast."

However, Ashley Bowen who documents on the happenings of Marblehead daily notes on August 16, 1775 "sailed the Merlin ... for Boston. As the Merlin passed Point of [the] Neck she fired a shot over the neck," and he does not indicate that the Merlin returns to the Marblehead area any time near January 1776. In addition, after the tree-cutting episode Bowen continues to record the actions of the Fowey and makes no mention of the Merlin; therefore, most likely it was the men of the Fowey and not the Merlin who cut down the trees. The amount of trees cut and the purpose of cutting them is not mentioned, though perhaps it allowed a better view of Marblehead Harbor to prevent the rebels (soon to be Americans) from escaping. Alternatively the lumber could have been used as fuel, though no mention of cutting wood on nearby more heavily wooded islands is mentioned.

The owners of the former Essex Hospital held the Island throughout the war. Sometime before 1787 both Glovers sold their quarter ownerships to Deacon William Williams of Marblehead. The Deacon then acquired another 16th part to gain majority ownership. After his death in 1787, his wife sold the property to Edward Fettyplace for $43.33 on June 25, 1795.

Some observations and events concerning the island occurred around this time. On August 18, 1791 Reverend William Bentley recorded the following in his diary:

We arrived at 5 o'clock at Cat Island, & not venturing near the shore on account of the surf we engaged a Marblehead skiff to land us on the beach. The beach is high, not of so large stones as at Baker's Island & not so long, & forms a point. The length of the Island is about N.W. & S.E. It is a very rocky shore, but contains from 15 to 20 acres of good pasture land, of easy access, & not much mixed with rocks. On the N.W. end is the place of the Smoak house [smokehouse], when this Island was used for a hospital for inoculation of the Small Pox about 19 years since. The hospital is towards the other end just before you arrive at the rocky & lofty Head. The cellar is yet whole upon which the hospital was built. The cellar was only under the N. end. This building fell a sacrifice to the popular fury soon after it was erected. It was burnt by the people of Marblehead upon some supposed indiscretions. There is a well open of considerable depth, but there was no water. There is a spring for the cattle at this part & about 10 head now upon it. From the top of the rocky head we had a very extensive prospect of the South Shore, Nahant Head & Rocks, Tinker's Island, Ram Island, the Rock of Marblehead, which I have visited, which is at one third of the distance from Marblehead Neck, the whole above one mile's distance. The rock called Satan was off between us & Half Way Rock. The Gooseberries were well distinguished, Baker's Island, Dry Breakers, & nearest to us Eagle Island, between which & the Gooseberries is the channel into Marblehead, from the entrance between Baker's Island & the Misery. I had not time for a particular examination, but the soil of this Island appeared better than that of any of the islands. The rocks on all sides are above it, & it is rendered rich by this situation. It is said that there are several springs, which I had not time to explore & the present being a dry season. We returned at low ebb, & ran aground & hence were obliged to wade ashore upon the flats. Beyond the S.E. or rocky head, & in the line of the islands, are two other heads of nearly the same projection & trending from the island in the line of the island itself, & form a curious appearance. On the S. side about the middle of the Island, are three other steep rocks & high, tho' not in any proportion to the former. Two of them are connected with the body of the island by the necks, which appear upon the ebb. The other stands bold up, but within these two & south of them. The beach is upon the N.W. side & in a direct course from Peach's Point, & the Black Rock.

The Reverend documented another trip to the Island in his diary on June 24, 1803: "... fished between grey rock & Cat Island, & as the wind was rising landed on Cat Island. Here we spent the day. The wind was so high that no tent could stand, & we were exposed to the sun without any shelter, & the heat was excessive. We could find no spring & the well was dry. We found three horses & good grass. In the evening we returned."

A continuing problem was shipwrecks against the many rocks and islands surrounding Marblehead Harbor. At the time there were no marine markers, and identifying hazards was difficult especially to those unfamiliar with the area. A temporary solution was to plant trees as landmarks onto large rocks, and using these as a reference points on charts and written navigational directions. As the Reverend notes in his diary on July 23, 1806: "Marblehead will petition for Marblehead rock, eastern rock of Cat Island, & Tinker’s & Ram island. He says the complaint of want of land marks is universal. He has planted a poplar on Marblehead rock having found a depth of soil in a spot of 5 feet. Eastern rock of Cat Island admits trees also & three have been planted" and again on Jan 29, 1807: "the Town have had a meeting upon the subject of the petition to the General Court from Marblehead to grant to their marine Society the Islands laying off that Town ... They ask for E. Rock of Cat Island, Marblehead rock, Tinker’s & Ram island, as Capt. prince informed me."

The Marblehead Marine Society was formed in 1798 "for the laudable purposes of promoting the knowledge of Navigation & Seamanship, of giving relief to decayed & disabled Seamen & to the indigent Widows and Orphans of deceased Seamen & of others who may be Members of said Society."

Mention of a landmark at these locations is made in the 1817th edition of The American Coast Pilot: "The Marblehead Marine Society has erected on Cat island rock, a spar 40 feet high, to the top of which is annexed a cask of about 130 gallons measure, which is seen at sea 20 or 30 feet above the land"

A date of 1808 is engraved into the rock at the top of Cormorant Rock, as the East Rock of Cat Island is now known, but no other evidence of a structure exists. This is the likely date and location of the spar described. No mention of marker is made in the 1806 (5th) edition of the American Coast Pilot, which implies the spar was placed between 1800 and 1817.

In January 1822 the General Court of Massachusetts ceded a part of Tinker’s Island, Marblehead Rock, and "also the East Rock of Cat Island" to the United States "for the purpose of erecting and preserving land marks thereon..."

A popular local myth is that Children's Island provided shelter to USS Constitution during the War of 1812. In fact, Fort Sewall and the difficulties in navigating into Marblehead Harbor were crucial in protecting Old Ironsides. In April 1814 USS Constitution had been chased by HMS Tenedos and HMS Endymion for three days. To outrun these ships, the crew of Constitution jettisoned her provisions, water, and “every thing movable.”. About three miles (5 km) off Fort Sewall, she was piloted into Marblehead Harbor by Samuel Green, a Marblehead native. The British were hesitant to follow, not wanting to venture too close to the protection of Fort Sewall and risk navigation through the unfamiliar channel.

Gradually and by 1816, the Fettyplace family acquired full ownership to Children's (Cat) Island, which they sold in 1846 to John Roundy of Marblehead. In February, 1848, Roundy sold the island “with all the buildings thereon” to Nathaniel Blaney of Marblehead. A year later, Nathaniel sold the property to David Blaney also of Marblehead.

=== Lowell Island House ===
Summary. For full article, see Lowell island house

In 1850, the Salem and Lowell Railroad Company opened, and in competition with the Boston and Lowell Railroad hoped to increase passenger travel. The owners decided to create a seaside resort near Salem and purchased Children's Island (Cat Island) from David Blaney for $1000. In August 1851, the first trip to the newly named Lowell Island was a huge success. Flush with this success, the owner's built a hotel on the Northwest section of the island which opened on June 15, 1852, and "contain[ed] a number of public and private parlors, one hundred sleeping rooms, and a dining hall which will seat two hundred and fifty persons. It is well ventilated and will be neatly furnished. Bowling alleys, conveniences for sea bathing, fishing apparatus and bait, and boats for sailing and fishing have been or will be provided...no intoxicating liquor will be sold in the boat or at the Hotel." "It possessed a T-shaped floor plan and was 2 ½ stories high under pitched, dormered, intersecting roofs with a central cupola." The Hotel was popular and well visited but lost money and subsequently was mortgaged and transferred between members of the company until finally sold to Gorham L. Pollard. Mr. Pollard operated the Island House (now known as Pollard Island House) until August, 1869 when he sold it to Andrew L. Johnson for $10,000. Mr. Johnson ran the hotel for the next three years but was not successful. In 1871 he sold the property, and over the next six years the property was bought and sold several times before being sold to Samuel B. Rindge for $4500 in January, 1878. Apparently, the Island House remained a resort under Mr. Rindge, as an advertisement for “Island House, Lowell Island, Salem Harbor. Open June 10, 1880” with departure and arrival times of the boat appears in an 1880 magazine Eventually Samuel's son, Frederick H. Rindge of California, donated the property to St. Margaret's Home of Boston for use as Children's Island Sanitarium

=== Children's Island Sanitarium ===
Summary. For full article, see Children's Island Sanitarium

Mr. Gilman states that in December, 1888 the island and buildings were deeded to Frederick H. Rindge for $1, who then gave the property to the Children's Island Sanitarium. However, this date must be wrong as the organization was actually incorporated in 1886, and "in 1886 a fourth summer home was added at Lowell Island near Marblehead" to the responsibilities of the Sisters of the Society of Saint Margaret. Many other sources also cite 1886 as the year the Sanitarium was established, and one even calls it "The Rindge Sanitarium".

It is clear that Mr. Fredrick Rindge did donate the Island, buildings, and $1000 to develop what became known as the Children's Island Sanitarium. In the late 19th century, "sea air [was] looked upon as almost a panacea for that class of disorders of nutrition which is shown in the disorders of joints and bones,...(and) in adopting the sea coast plan for their Institute the managers of the Lowell Island Sanitorium...hope that the beneficial effect of sea air would be especially manifest in children suffering from chronic malnutrition, a belief which is entertained by all medical authorities.". On July 11, 1886 the Children's Island Sanitarium was opened for nearly two months and hosted a total of 150 children "exposed to the summer diseases of crowded cities, or to children...troubled by the affliction popularly called 'rickets'." Despite the belief that the Children's Island Sanitarium was a tuberculosis sanitarium, no child with a contagious disease, especially active tuberculosis, was admitted. Joint and bone infections (osteomyelitis), both TB and non-TB, are not contagious and these children were admitted. Many other children who were there suffered deformities from rickets or vitamin D deficiency.

One persistent problem of the Island is the lack of fresh water: HMS Fowey apparently left the island to look for fresh water on Baker's Island in 1776, and some claimed "the hotel had been a failure because there was not enough water on the island for its numerous guests." Water from the island was also on the mind of the Board of Managers of the Sanitarium, and they submitted a well water sample from the island to the Massachusetts Board of Health for testing on September 10, 1907. The test results "show that the water is very hard, has a disagreeable odor and contains an excessive quantity of organic matter. It is unfit for drinking, and the Board would recommend that the further use of this source be prevented."

A large financial supporter of the Children’s Island Sanitarium, the Boston Community Fund, withdrew support necessitating the closure of the Sanitarium. In 1946, the trustees voted "not to use Children’s Island for the purposes for which this corporation is organized after November 1, 1946; and to surrender possession therof on that date to the heirs and assigns of Frederick H. Rindge."

The island remained in Rindge's possession until being leased by the Marblehead YMCA which opened a summer camp.

=== Children's Island Day Camp ===
In 1955, Children's Island was leased by the Marblehead YMCA which opened a summer camp. The following year the YMCA purchased the island with money contributed by four YMCA directors. A new pier was constructed, and two foundations converted into swimming pools. In the 1960s, the sailors and arts and crafts building were constructed. In June 1971, 60 Army Reserve engineers completed a $40,000 repair project filling in open holes, stabilizing the swimming pool, and repaired retention walls. The island sustained heavy damage in the blizzard of 1978, the repair of which required the YMCA to take out a loan. Children are picked up from a dock on State Street in Marblehead (and more recently Pickering Wharf in Salem) and are returned at the end of the day. Activities at camp have included sailing, archery, swimming, riflery (formerly), nature, arts & crafts, fishing, and one or more overnights a session. A "Rangers" Program modeled after the Boy Scouts was created in the 1960s by Peter Sawin and has always been extremely popular. During the "Perfect Storm" of 1991, the island sustained significant damage, and the pier was nearly destroyed. It was moved from its central position on the island to a location on the southwest side. However, this was more open to the wind and waves and was moved back to the original location a few years later. In the 1990s, multiple new buildings were constructed including the Ranger's Lodge, Gazebo, and a combination office and infirmary. Although known as Children's Island since the days of the sanitarium in the early 1900s, its name was officially changed from Cat Island to Children's Island by petition of the Marblehead/Swampscott YMCA in 1996.
