= Cormorant Rock =

Cormorant Rock may refer to the following:

- Cormorant Rock (Essex County, Massachusetts), an island in Essex County, Massachusetts, USA
- Cormorant Rock, County Antrim, a townland in County Antrim, Northern Ireland
