= Widow's walk =

Railed rooftop platform on a house

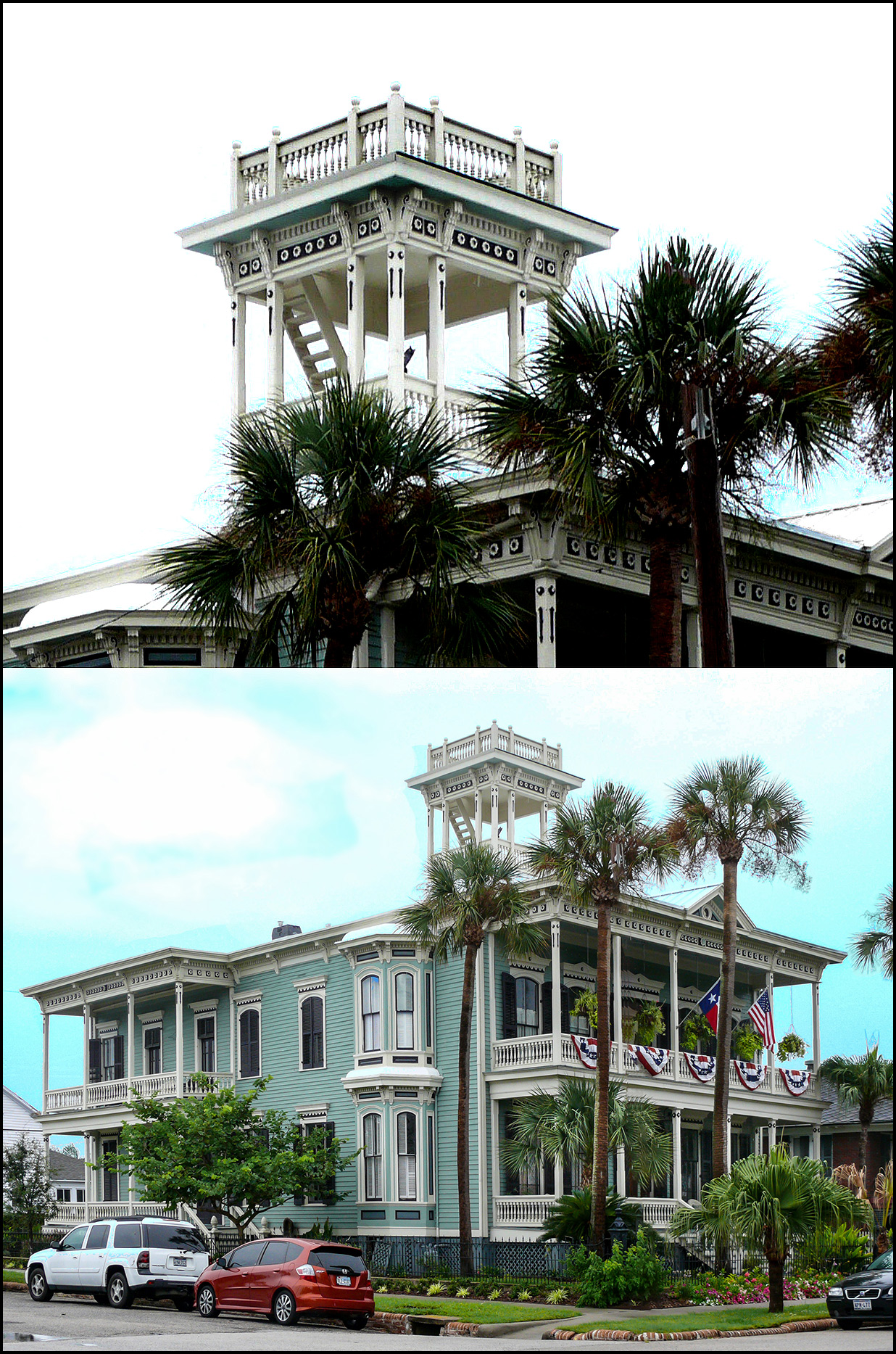
The Julius Ruhl Home, one of many homes in Galveston, Texas, with widow's walks.

A widow's walk, also known as a widow's watch or roofwalk, is a railed rooftop platform often having an inner cupola/turret frequently found on 19th-century North American coastal houses. The name is said to come from the wives of mariners, who would watch for their spouses' return, often in vain as the ocean took their lives, leaving the women widows. In other coastal communities, the platforms were called captain's walks, as they topped the homes of the more successful captains; supposedly, ship owners and captains would use them to search the horizon for ships due in port.

However, there is little or no evidence that widow's walks were intended or regularly used to observe shipping. Widow's walks are in fact a standard decorative feature of Italianate architecture, which was very popular during the height of the Age of Sail in many North American coastal communities. The widow's walk is a variation of the Italianate cupola. The Italianate cupola, its larger instance being an archetypal belvedere, was an important ornate finish to this style, although it was often high maintenance and prone to leaks.

Beyond their use as viewing platforms, they are frequently built around the chimney of the residence, potentially creating access to the structure. This allows the residents of the home ready access to the roof of the home to pour sand down burning chimneys in the event of a chimney fire in the hope of preventing the house from burning down.

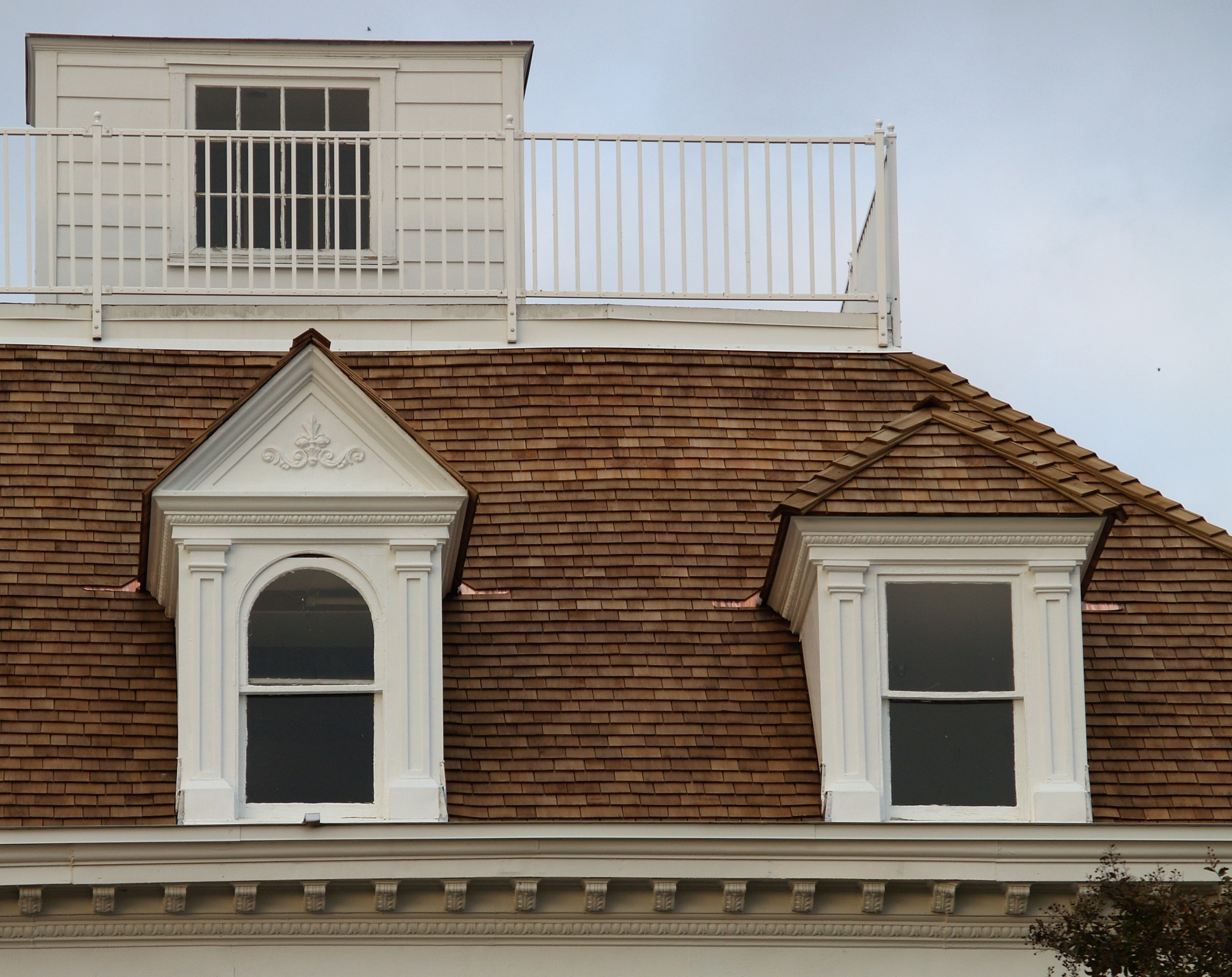
A widow's walk in Gaithersburg, Maryland.

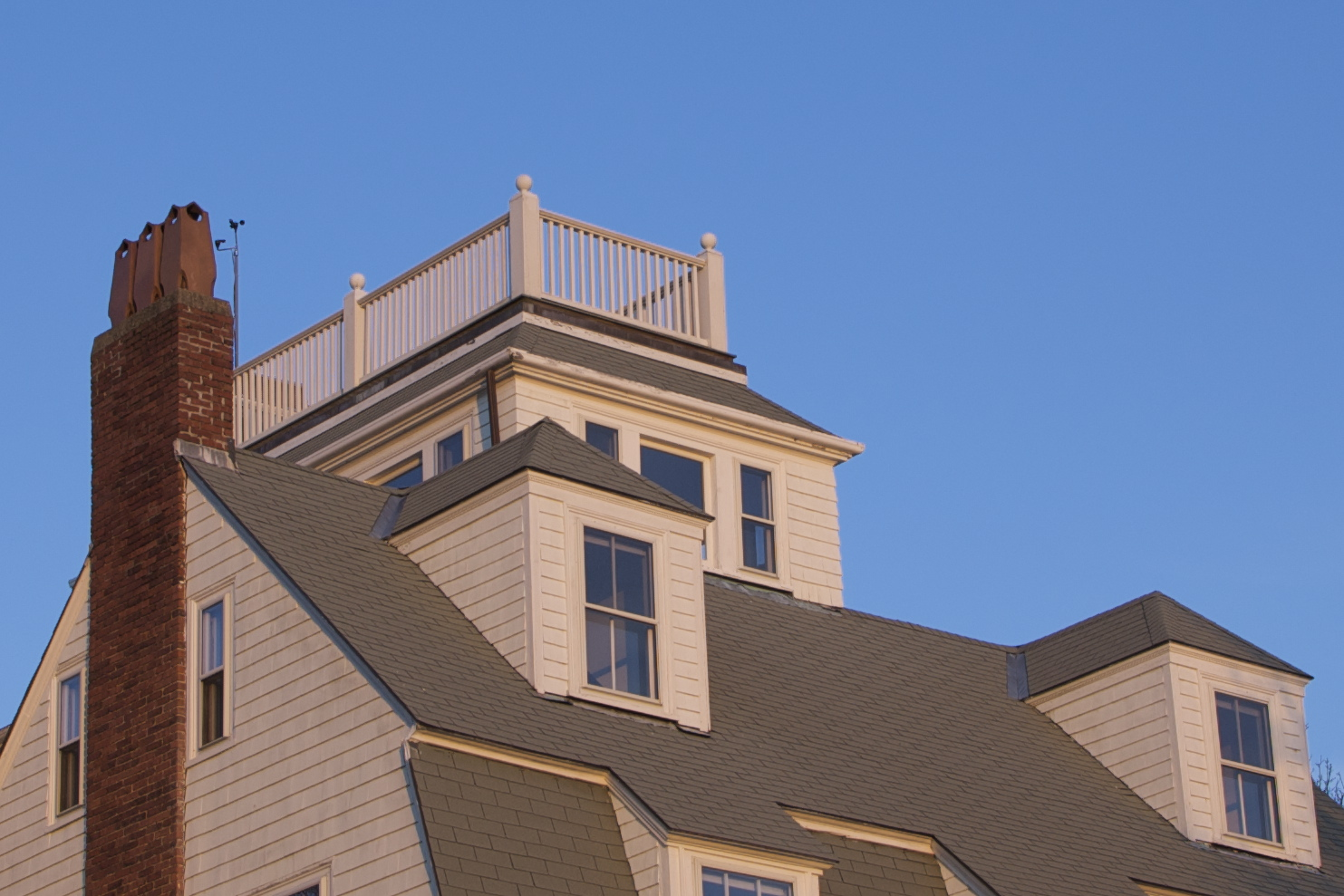
A widow's walk on a home overlooking Marblehead Harbor in Marblehead, Massachusetts.

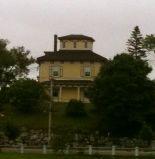
A "widow's watch" on a home in Saint John, New Brunswick, Canada. Unlike examples in warmer climates, this one is enclosed.

== See also ==
- Belvedere
- Bird hide
- Gazebo
