= Children's Island Sanitarium =

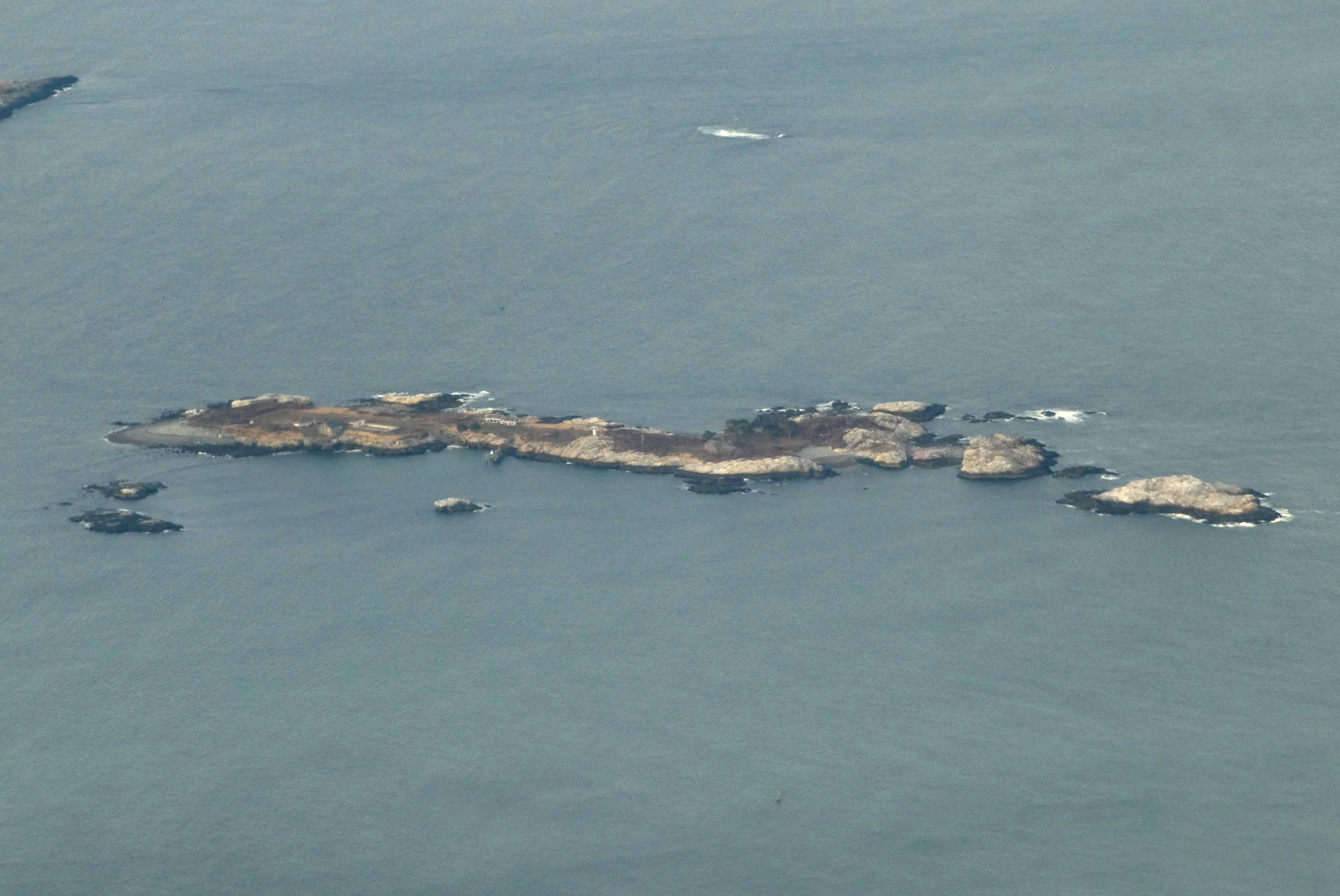
- Children's Island in 2022

Geography
- Location: Children's Island, Salem, Massachusetts, United States
- Coordinates: 42°30′42″N 70°48′52″W

Organization
- Type: Specialist

Services
- Speciality: Chronic illness

History
- Opened: 1886
- Closed: 1946

Links
- Lists: Hospitals in Massachusetts

Children's Island Sanitarium was a sanitarium on Children's Island in Essex County, Massachusetts from 1886 until 1946 where many chronically ill children spent the summer, where the outdoor, ocean air might make them better.

Children's Island was for many years the location of a failed Island House (Lowell island house), and was finally donated by its final owner, Mr. Fredrick Rindge, to develop what became known as the "Children's Island Sanitarium, a corporation duly established...subject to the following conditions ‘That said property shall be used by the Children's Island Sanitarium only for the use and purpose for which said corporation was organized...and the property will revert and reinvest in me and my heirs and assigns.'” Additionally, he stressed that “children of every race, color and religion should be received there." The Society of Saint Margaret of Boston were chosen to run the Sanitarium. This society was already very involved in the Children's Hospital in Boston and the Sea-Shore Home in Winthrop, so its members had experience with the recovery of ill or crippled children. In the late 19th century, “sea air [was] looked upon as almost a panacea for that class of disorders of nutrition which is shown in the disorders of joints and bones,...(and) in adopting the sea coast plan for their Institute the managers of the Lowell Island Sanitorium...hope that the beneficial effect of sea air would be especially manifest in children suffering from chronic malnutrition, a belief which is entertained by all medical authorities.”. On July 11, 1886 the Children's Island Sanitarium was opened for nearly two months and hosted a total of 150 children “exposed to the summer diseases of crowded cities, or to children...troubled by the affliction popularly called ‘rickets’.” The children were carefully selected and initially "boys under 10 and girls of any age or race, suffering from the chronic diseases which are benefited by a marine atmosphere, such as rickets, hip, spinal diseases, etc.; also, for children convalescing from severe operations" were eligible for admission. "Children (were) admitted free when circumstances demand(ed). The usual stay is a fortnight, which (was) extended when necessary." Despite the belief that the Children's Island Sanitarium was a tuberculosis sanitarium, no child with a contagious disease, especially active tuberculosis, was admitted. Joint and bone infections (osteomyelitis), both TB and non-TB, are not contagious and these children were admitted. Many other children who were there suffered deformities from rickets or vitamin D deficiency. In addition to children, the Sanitarium allowed “working women in need of a holiday (to) be received on the payment of a sufficient sum to defray the cost of their board.”

A journalist from the Boston Transcript spent a day in September, 1890 on the Island and wrote:

...The house itself is a large building, originally a summer hotel. Owing to the lateness of the season the number of children present was smaller than it had been before. Nearly two hundred had been there during the three months’ occupancy. Many of the children are unable to get farther than the broad piazza, thou often the little crutches help to climb many of the rocks.

We first entered the house, leaving the island itself for later inspection. A long corridor runs straight through the building, through which a breeze must always pass. As we entered the door, such a charming picture of blue sea, green grass, and grey rocks was revealed through the door at the farther end! The house is shaped like a large T, the long dining-room being in the stem of the letter, and over it the children’s dormitories. Down stairs are long, cool-looking parlors, simply and tastefully furnished, with muslin curtains at the many windows looking out on the wide piazza. A piano, much weather-stained, stands between the folding doors, and is a source of much entertainment, equal to the accompaniment of familiar hymns, and often in the evenings keeping time for impromptu dances. Beyond these long parlors is a pretty, square room called the reading-room, where those wanting quiet can find a pleasant retreat. Before going up stairs we were taken into the dining-room, where the children were at dinner. They looked very happy and seemed to have excellent appetites. Over the dining-room is another long corridor from which lead off twenty-five little rooms, each containing two small iron bedsteads, thus allowing room for fifty children, the number usually present at one time. There are other rooms that can be utilized, and in a remote part of the house a room used as an isolated ward in case of an infectious disease breaking out, though great care is taken that no contagious cases are admitted. At the farther end of the corridor where the children’s rooms are, there is a room devoted to the visiting doctor’s needs. Besides the children there is a number of women taken as boarders, who find here rest, pure air, and freedom from care, for a moderate charge. The conveniences of the house amply allow for this. A great want is certainly supplied when working women can find such a resting-place.

After enjoying a tour of the house, even to the cupola, from which there is a fine view, we went out of doors to see the island itself. Near the house is a large refreshment saloon, on one side of which is a bowling alley with balls and pins intact. The large room of the saloon is used for a play-room in wet weather, and here also parties are held. Each set of children as a “sail” and a “party.” The rocks on the farther end of the island are rugged and picturesque. Perched on two of the highest points are summer-houses, delightfully cool spots in which to read or work on a summer’s day. A pebbly beach in a little cove affords good bathing facilities, and here are the bath-houses. When we left, most of the children were allowed to take the sail to Marblehead with us. How they delight in sailing.

“Children’s island sanitarium...was carried on by the Sisters (of St. Margaret) for 15 years; at the end of that time the old house had gone to pieces and a new building was erected, but in this there were only accommodations for the children and those in charge of them. This changed the whole character of the work and in 1900 the Mother decided to give it up. Subsequently, a new Board of Managers to oversee the operation of the sanitarium was formed with Dr. Charles E. Inches as president (replaced by Phillip L. Saltonstall in 1905.), and Mrs. Lucy W. Davis as superintendent. It seems that most of the tasks previously carried out by the Sisters were now carried out by volunteers who were "young women who give their time and services out of love for the little people and interest in the cause. They remain on the average, three weeks, and are on either morning or afternoon duty for a week at a time-four in the morning, three in the afternoon."

Other changes included allowing children as young as 18 months and boys up to age 14, though most children were between four and twelve. One volunteer, Maude S. Curtiss, wrote an article for The American Journal of Nursing describing life on the island:

There are four beaches where the children play, which they call the Shell Beach, the Wading Beach, the Crab Beach, and the Bathing Beach. These have no sand, but are plentifully furnished with stones and shells, with rocks and rocky hollows which hold little pools of water, with seaweed and drift-wood and wonderful articles which come up with each tide and delight the hearts of children: old hats and boxes and tin cans of equally priceless value. Both the Wading and Bathing Beaches slope gradually into the water, where the little folk can wade out after jelly-fish and crabs or sail their boats...It is the stormy day that is dreaded, and then chiefly by the volunteer; for the children it means confinement indoors, to be sure, but also the joys of the play-rooms: books, games, and toys, the see-saw, the merry-go-round, the tuneless piano, the doll houses, things to cut, and things to sew; for the volunteers it means the confusion and noise of seventy-five pairs of heels and seventy-five shrill and lusty throats, and the tears of those who have been sorely visited with the wrath of a comrade.

...The children are never left alone. Attendants dress and undress them and put them to bed, and one is on watch at night. From the attendants they pass into the hands of the volunteers, seven in number, who have charge of them during the day and at meals. The work of bathing the children, the adjustment of splints, casts, and braces, is considered too important to be entrusted to any but trained nurses. Of these there are two – the superintendent, Miss Davis, and her assistant.

...The volunteers serve the children their food, this being considered too important a matter to be entrusted to attendants. They must see that the children have all they need and that they eat what is served them, coaxing and making note of reluctant appetites.

Another volunteer, Eleanor Fairchild Cadwallader worked in the 1930s and recalls:

I got off on a bare, rocky, small island with a few large wooded buildings. One was our dormitory and another the dormitory, dining area, and play area for the children. These children were patients...deemed well enough to go to this sea setting for rehabilitation. Most of the patients were polio victims; some had other problems I don’t remember except the ones with osteomyelitis wounds that wouldn’t heal.”

Another account by a volunteer in 1940:

Children’s Island...at one end was a hospital, so called, where chronically ill children from the worst sections of Boston [were sent]. They were chosen on the recommendation of various social workers and physicians who thought that the fresh sea air, simple regular meals, and structured days would benefit most from a summer on the island. Most of the children came from chaotic households where they were not necessarily mistreated, but rather carelessly treated, so that some of them had slow to heal wounds from home accidents – boiling water spilled on them, stove burns, bad cuts from knives left within their reach. Most of them, however, suffered from serious and intractable asthma, bronchitis and particularly osteomyelitis which had resulted in deep, open, running sores. Our first close-up view of the island was dispiriting. The hospital, at one end was nothing more than a series of low shed-like buildings, almost rickety-seeming. At the other end, perched on rock, was a more attractive lodge for housing us 24 volunteers, 12 for each 12 hour shift....The lodge featured a large tastefully decorated living room with stone fireplace and two wings of six double bedrooms each. The wings were so widely separated so that the shift going on duty wouldn’t disturb the sleep of those who were off. Behind the living room was a dormitory styled bathroom – multiple basins, toilet stalls and showers. BUT – aye, there’s the rub – no fresh water in the whole place. Tooth brushing with salt water is not refreshing, but a salt water shower is the pits. Most of us, on our 12 hours off would assemble soap, towels and such and have Carver let us off at the Marblehead dock, from which a short walk took us to a pretty seaside restaurant. The proprietor allowed us to use the restroom off the dining room – a real bathroom with a tub. The privilege cost us all of 25 cents each....The first of my two summers at Children’s Island I was assigned to the ward with the youngest children, ranging in age from baby Charles who was less than two to a seven year old wild kid named Eddie. There were two of us volunteer nurses for each ward and we spent every minute of our on-duty days with the kids. Two or three registered nurses came around to administer meds and to change the dressings of the burn victims and the osteomyelitis draining sores. The R.N.s also did night duty and lived in the hospital, as did the intimidating Miss (Elsie) Wulkop who strolled around all day peering through the screens from covered walkways outside the wards. After lunch, a dreadful messy event, we were supposed to get the children to take naps. Ha ha. One day I had just unfastened Eddie's heavy leg brace and bent down to pick his socks up from the floor when he seized the brace and whacked me over the head with it. It knocked me out, but he could have fractured my skull...Every day when we went on duty we picked up a starched white coverall apron and a white headdress like a nun’s veil, into which we were required to tuck every hair and securing it with bobby pins. This was to protect us from head lice. Once a week was delousing and bath day, using very little fresh water. It took a half day to do this for each ward. It was gross. What we did was pick nits with our fingernails on each hair where we saw the telltale little speck. Then shampoo the kids and clean our own fingernails very thoroughly. I’m making the whole experience sound awful, but it wasn’t. We learned a lot, made new friends, had many laughs. Two doctors came out from the mainland once a week – volunteers also. We watched them treating the children and learned a few useful tricks from them. The absolutely worst day was parents visiting day when boatloads of parents came throughout the day. Many of the mothers cried the whole time, the fathers shifted uneasily from foot to foot and at departure time the air was rent with sobs and screams.

A large financial supporter of the Children's Island Sanitarium, the Boston Community Fund, withdrew support necessitating the closure of the Sanitarium. In 1946, the trustees voted “not to use Children’s Island for the purposes for which this corporation is organized after November 1, 1946; and to surrender possession thereof on that date to the heirs and assigns of Frederick H. Rindge.”.
