= Lowell Island House =

Hotel in Massachusetts, United States

Lowell Island House was a nineteenth-century hotel on Lowell Island (now known as Children's Island), which comprises a part of Salem, Massachusetts. The island is geographically closer to the city of Marblehead than it is to mainland Salem.

== Background ==
=== Salem Steamboat Company ===
In 1848, Stephen C. Phillips and his associates formed the Salem and Lowell Railroad Company. By the summer of 1850 the railroad was opened; it terminated at Phillips Wharf in Salem. The company's hope was to compete with the Boston and Lowell Railroad by restoring Salem's lost commerce. To increase demand, the company created a seaside resort near Salem. In May 1851, the Salem Steamboat Company was formed "to purchase, build, charter or otherwise hold and employ a steamboat to be used in and about the harbor of Salem, as well as to hold real estate to an amount not exceeding $1,000". On June 11, 1851, Stephen Phillips purchased Children's Island (formerly Cat Island) from David Blaney for $1,000. In January 1852, he transferred the deed to the Salem Steamboat Company.

=== Lowell Island ===
The company immediately advertised trips to the renamed Lowell Island, with the first trip leaving from Phillips Wharf in Salem on August 15, 1851. The initial day was successful, but entertaining the customers was difficult because, "at the time of the purchase of the island the only building upon it was one used by fishermen as a fish-house." However, "this was altered and enlarged to serve as a place of resort and entertainment for visitors. It was partitioned off so as to accommodate as many as possible in a given space." Encouraged by the turnout, the owners raised money to build the Lowell Island Hotel.

== Hotel ==
The hotel was built on the Northwest section of the island. It opened on June 15, 1852 and "contain[ed] a number of public and private parlors, one hundred sleeping rooms, and a dining hall which will seat two hundred and fifty persons. It is well ventilated and will be neatly furnished. Bowling alleys, conveniences for sea bathing, fishing apparatus and bait, and boats for sailing and fishing have been or will be provided ... no intoxicating liquor will be sold in the boat or at the Hotel." "It possessed a T-shaped floor plan and was 2½ stories high under pitched, dormered, intersecting roofs with a central cupola."

=== Financial difficulties ===
Initially the steamboat Merrimack was used until the Argo was purchased for $25,000, and departure points in Beverly and Marblehead Harbors were added. The hotel was popular and well-visited, but according to Alfred Gilman, "the house did not pay the running expenses. What was gained by the house was swallowed up by the expense of running the steamboat", and the corporation eventually voted to sell the property.

The property was subsequently mortgaged and transferred between members of the company, until finally in July 1857, "the establishment, including steamboat, was sold to Gorham L. Pollard", who immediately sold the steamboat. Pollard operated the Island House until August 1869, when "Cat Island, recently called Lowell Island and sometimes called Pollard's Island, with all boats, their tackle and furniture, all fishing lines and materials, bathing suits and other articles of personal property including a piano", were sold to Andrew L. Johnson for $10,000.

A Lowell newspaper from the fall of 1869 read:

During the present fall a substantial wharf has been erected on the south side of the island near where the bath-house formerly stood ... The whole house has been raised and beneath it has been placed a substantial foundation, so that the floors will be firm and level. The building formerly used as a bowling alley went to smash in the September gale. In place of the old bowling alley building, a better one is to be erected which will accommodate an alley, billiard tables, and a refreshment saloon ...

== Property transfers ==
Johnson ran the hotel for three years but was not successful. In 1871, he sold the property, and over the next six years the property was bought and sold several times before finally being purchased by Samuel B. Rindge for $4,500 in January 1878. Apparently, the Island House remained a resort under Rindge, as an advertisement for "Island House, Lowell Island, Salem Harbor. Open June 10, 1880", with departure and arrival times of the boat, appeared in an 1880 magazine Eventually Samuel's son, Frederick H. Rindge of California, donated the property to St. Margaret's Home of Boston for use as Children's Island Sanitarium.
