= Essex Hospital =

Hospital in the United States

Geography
- Location: Cat Island, Salem, Massachusetts, United States
- Coordinates: 42°30′45.59″N 70°48′54.22″W

Organization
- Type: Specialist

Services
- Speciality: Smallpox

History
- Constructed: 1773
- Opened: 1773
- Closed: 1774
- Demolished: 1774

Links
- Lists: Hospitals in Massachusetts

The Essex Hospital was a privately built smallpox inoculation hospital on Cat Island (now Children's Island) where many people were effectively inoculated against smallpox in 1773–1774. About a year after it opened, it was burned to the ground by paranoid and angry townspeople of Marblehead, Massachusetts.

== History ==
In June, 1773, Marblehead was stricken by an epidemic of smallpox. The typical response to an outbreak was undertaken by town officials, including daily surveillance of the inhabitants by a Committee of Inspection, fencing off of infected areas, moving infected people to pesthouses, inspecting cargo arriving into the town, and limiting out of town visitors. Some forward-thinking townspeople argued in favor of inoculation of the disease; diluted, contaminated material (pus) from a person with mild disease would be injected into a healthy person who would, with hope, develop a very mild case of the disease, fully recover, and then be immune. However, most people at the time were terrified of and vehemently opposed to the practice.

On August 9, 1773, a Town Meeting in Marblehead was held to debate the construction of a public inoculation hospital on one of the nearby islands. The proposal was rejected, but the majority did agree to allow a private funding of a hospital as long as the Marblehead Selectmen could regulate it. On August 17 a petition to build a private inoculation hospital on an island was sent to Governor Hutchinson who approved the measure. The owners of the future Essex Hospital were four popular Marblehead political figures: John Glover, Jonathan Glover (John Glover's brother), Azor Orne, and Elbridge Gerry; they purchased Children's Island (Catt Island) on September 2, 1773. Despite having received permission from the town, their decision to inoculate remained contentious. Many Marbleheaders feared that the inoculation process would cause new outbreaks of the disease and that the hospital itself would scare off merchant ships arriving at Marblehead and Salem Harbors. Some opponents of the hospital also denigrated the plan as a get-rich scheme by the proprietors. In response to the fear the town selectmen prescribed strict rules to which the proprietors agreed. On October 5 to help alleviate some concerns "The Rules and Regulations of the Essex Hospital on Catt Island" were published in the local newspaper, The Essex Gazette. These rules required guards to be posted on the island to ensure no one would come ashore without a permit and no one would leave the island without a health clearance from a physician. No boat other than the hospitals' were to approach the island, and once returned to Marblehead were to dock only at approved locations within the harbor. People on the island were not to approach the island landing and a fence and trench would separate areas where supplies were dropped off from areas used by people on the island.

By early October, the hospital and a shifting-house were completed. Upon arriving on a beach at the northwest part of the island the new patients would enter the clean room of the small, one-story shifting house where they left a clean set of clothes to be worn upon departing. Another room in the building, the shifting-room, as where at the end of their island stay they would strip, wash, and be fumigated before entering the clean-room and getting dressed in the previously left, uncontaminated clothes. The hospital itself was located on the southwestern section of the island, was three stories high, had ten rooms each with four beds, a kitchen, and accommodations for a steward, the physicians, nurses, and their assistants.

The proprietors of the hospital employed Dr. Hall Jackson from Portsmouth as hospital superintendent, and Dr. Ananias Randall from Long Island as assistant physician. The proprietors set a fee "for board, nursing, inoculation, etc., and for the poor which are considerably numerous, inoculation gratis one poor inhabitant for every ten others inoculated." Two boats were employed, the Mercury Cruiser to transport people, and the Noah's Ark to transport cattle, sheep, deer, and animal feed.

On October 19,

... the first class of patients went down to the Essex Hospital. As a number of respectable persons, of both sexes, were in it and the hospital was clear of infection, many gentlemen of the town accompanied it to the island, and the hospital was thronged in every quarter. In the afternoon the house was cleared and Dr. Jackson proceeded to inoculate the patients, being one hundred and three in number ... The patients are daily displaying their signal of health [by flying flags] from the middle of the island and all are in high spirits

Among the first class of patients were Captain John Glover and his family, all of whom were inoculated and then remained as volunteers. Ashley Bowen, exemplifying some of the bitter feelings toward the hospital, sarcastically noted in his journal on October 19:

This day at noon Colonel Orne with a body of volunteers and a number of invalids landed at Cape Pus on the NW end of the Isle of Catt and laid siege to the Castle of Pox, General Jackson, commander-in-chief; General Randall, leftenant general of Castle Pox; Arnaold Martin Esq., chief admiral of the white, in sloop Ashley. Tis supposed this siege will last thirty days. By an expressed from Castle Pox General Jackson had a smart engagement and wounded nearly a 100 of Colonel Orne's body of volunteers the first evening they landed, of both sexes from the age of 3 years to 60 first day, and that General Randall engaged the Colonel himself.

Since those exposed to smallpox (including recently inoculated) are not contagious for 10 days, visitors were allowed during this time. A newspaper article at the time notes, the patients "are indeed confined to a strict regimen; but they may every day be seen walking the island, shooting wild fowl, playing at quoits, etc." On November 5, 1773, the patients and staff on the island celebrated Pope's Day (a colonial variant of Guy Fawkes Day) by lighting tar barrels "and a large fire displayed from the middle of the Island; the hospital was likewise illuminated, and made a most beautiful appearance here. Rockets were ordered from Boston ... a number of gentlemen, who spent the evening in the assembly room, had them played off from their quarters, and spent the evening after very jovially, as did their friends and acquaintance under inoculation."

Most of the first class of patients were able to leave the hospital from November 9-11th. On November 15, the second class of patients, numbering around 100, were inoculated at Essex Hospital. One of the members of this second group was Captain Lowell of Newburyport, who on December 4, 1773, was severely injured while loading a four-pound cannon on the island. Both arms were amputated, one eye was destroyed and the other severely injured, and his upper chest and neck were severely injured. Dr. Jackson performed immediate surgery, and Captain Lowell was able to leave the hospital on January 16, 1774. As of January 26, he was still alive. The third class of patients was inoculated at the hospital on December 15, 1773.

=== Destruction ===
In early January 1774, a boatload of this third class was discharged from the island but attempted to land at Nick's Cove, an unsanctioned landing area in Marblehead. Many townspeople were upset and a period of disorder and riots ensued. On January 12, the hospital boat Mercury was set on fire in Marblehead Harbor. One week later four townsmen were caught stealing contaminated clothing from the island while attempting to smuggle them into Marblehead. Presumably, they were hoping to earn condemnation for the hospital by starting an outbreak of smallpox. The following morning the four were tarred and feathered and paraded through Marblehead into Salem, a source of much entertainment to those witnessing the spectacle. Due to ongoing opposition, the hospital proprietors called for a town meeting on January 24 to ask the town to purchase the hospital and supplies, and to decide if the hospital should be kept open. Alternatively, they requested that if the hospital be closed that "a committee to cleanse the furniture, etc. in the so just and most satisfactory manner to the Town" be formed. The town refused to buy the hospital and supplies but did form a committee to oversee disinfection. On the following day, the three committee members and eight members of their family spent the next two days on the island cleaning and disinfecting, when on the second night they were suddenly awakened by fire. During the night, approximately 20 townspeople had snuck onto the island and set the hospital on fire. Everyone escaped alive but all buildings and property were burned or destroyed.

For the rest of January and into February, Marblehead was in a general state of uproar. A military watch was formed and the General Court of Massachusetts was petitioned to help restore order. At the end of February, John Watts and John Guillard of Marblehead were arrested for suspicion of burning the hospital. They were jailed in Salem but were freed the same night by a violent mob from Marblehead. Within a week the High Sheriff of the County called for help in apprehending the accused and their rescuers. At the same time, a large group from Marblehead called for arms to defend the two men. To quell the inevitable violence, the four owners of the Essex Hospital nobly dropped all charges and refused to pursue the matter further. The final act of the "smallpox war" occurred in March when one of the men who had been tarred and feathered for attempting to smuggle clothes from the island was caught trying to recover more clothing from the island. That night he was dragged from bed by an unruly mob and publicly whipped. These events were quickly forgotten as thoughts turned toward revolution.

The owners of the former Essex Hospital held the Island throughout the American Revolutionary War. Sometime before 1787 both Glovers sold their quarter ownerships to Deacon William Williams of Marblehead. The Deacon then acquired another 16th part to gain majority ownership. After his death in 1787, his wife sold the property to Edward Fettyplace for $43.33 on June 25, 1795.
