= Azor Orne =

American politician

Azor Orne (July 22, 1731 – June 6, 1796), sometimes spelled Azore, was a colonial American merchant, politician and patriot. In the years preceding the American Revolution, Orne built a controversial hospital to quarantine and help smallpox sufferers, became a militia colonel, and was a founding member of the Massachusetts Bay Colony's committee of safety. As a scion of a powerful Marblehead, Massachusetts merchant family, Orne lent money to the continental cause but was never repaid. Orne was appointed major general of the wartime militia, and after the revolution, he signed his state's constitution and was one of those who approved the national constitution.

== Early life ==
Orne was born in Marblehead, Massachusetts, son of merchant Joshua Orne Jr. and Sarah (Gale). His grandfathers were sea captain Azor Gale and merchant Joshua Orne, both of Marblehead. The Orne family descended from John Orne (variously Horn and Horne) who arrived in Salem in 1630, became a freeman in 1631, and served the first church of Salem as deacon for 50 years. The younger Orne was one of three children born to Joshua Jr. and Sarah. After his mother's death, Azor's father married Agnes Stacey, the widow of a friend, John Gallison; Agnes brought several children from her first marriage, and Joshua Jr. and Agnes themselves had three children, at least one of whom, Joshua, lived to adulthood.

== Colonial merchant ==
Orne was a merchant; though an owner and bondsman of several ships, his primary wealth derived from buildings and property. During a smallpox epidemic in 1773, Orne and several associates solicited the town of Marblehead to build an inoculation hospital on Cat Island (now Children's Island). The town refused, but allowed Orne, John Glover, Jonathan Glover and Elbridge Gerry to construct Essex Hospital as a private enterprise. The hospital operated successfully for several months, but by January 1774, several townspeople of Marblehead conspired to burn or destroy all the structures on the island. Orne and his associates lost their entire investments.

== Political career ==
Frequently chosen in his thirties as a selectman to Marblehead's council, by 1773 Orne was a respected legislator in the Massachusetts Provincial Congress. In 1775, Orne was appointed judge of the general court and held 179 seats on various committees, "the heaviest load of all members." A captain of militia since 1761, Orne was appointed colonel in 1775, and in 1776 was appointed one of three major generals of state militia, but never participated in the field. Before and during the war, Orne played an active role in Massachusetts' committees of correspondence and safety, narrowly escaping capture at Menotomy along with fellow members Elbridge Gerry and Jeremiah Lee in the days surrounding Lexington and Concord. During the war, Orne continued to support the rebellion with his money and influence.

Orne was a delegate to the Hartford Convention in 1780, and was one of those committeemen who created a circular advocating the necessity of taxation to provide for revenue. He was a member of the Massachusetts legislature which wrote the state's first constitution, and eight years later was a member of the legislature which approved the United States Constitution on behalf of his state. He unsuccessfully ran for the U.S. Senate in 1788. A Whig elector in the second presidential election of 1792, Orne voted on behalf of his state to re-elect George Washington, the first President of the United States.

== Later years ==
Orne's half brother Joshua also participated in the American Revolutionary War, serving in the army as a major. Azor Orne was twice married, to Mary Coleman in 1754 (died 1786) and to his brother's widow Mary Lee, sister of Jeremiah Lee, in 1786 (died 1799).

The Azor Orne house at 18 Orne Street still stands in Marblehead, under private ownership.

== Bibliography ==
Jensen, Merrill; Becker, Robert, eds. (1976). The First Federal Elections 1788-1790: Congress, South Carolina, Pennsylvania, Massachusetts, New Hampshire. Vol. 1. University of Wisconsin Press. ISBN 0299066908.
