= Cormorant Rock (Essex County, Massachusetts) =

Island in Essex County, Massachusetts, United States

Coordinates: 42°30′28.51″N 70°48′43.32″W

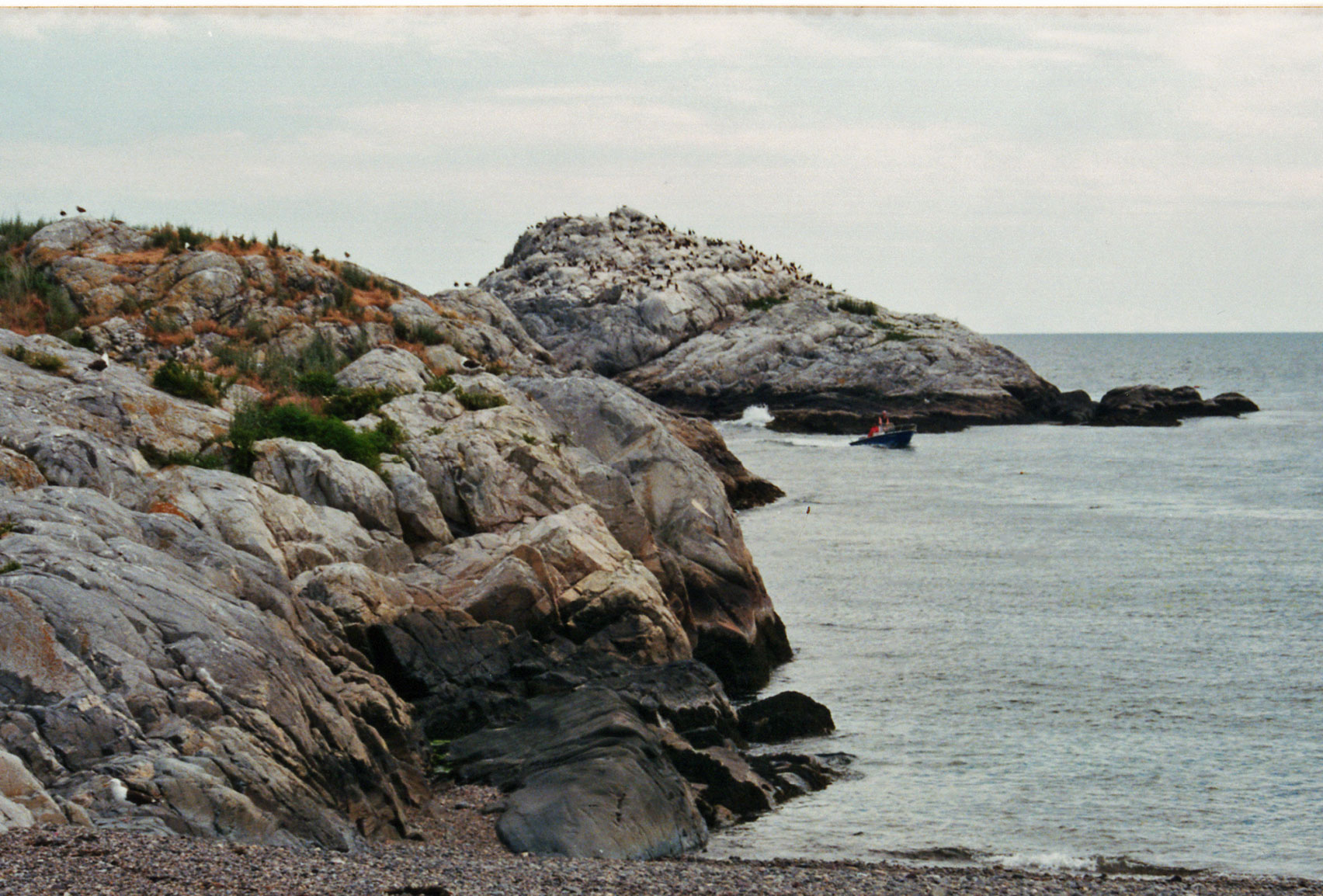
View of Cormorant Rock from Wally Beach on Children's Island

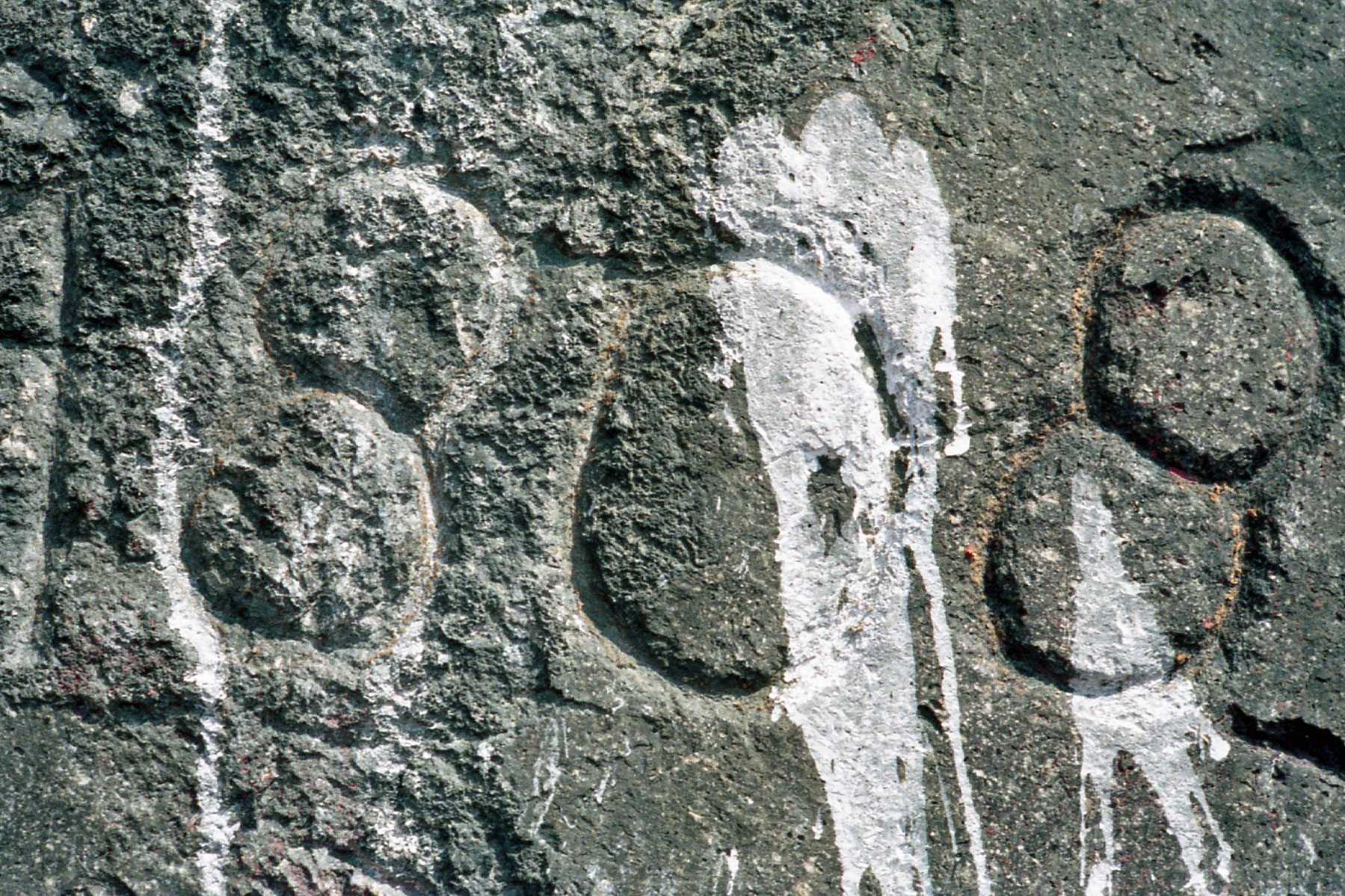
1808 engraving on top of Cormorant Rock

Cormorant Rock is a small island about 300 feet (91 m) off the southeastern tip of Children's Island just outside Marblehead Harbor, at latitude 42.510ºN, longitude 70.812ºW. Formerly known as Cat Island Rock and Eastern Rock of Cat Island, it is considered to be a part of Children's Island and was the location of a navigational spar erected in 1808 by the Marblehead Marine Society. Both islands are part of the city of Salem, even though they are closer to mainland Marblehead and are enclaved by its (water) territory.

For many years, local mariners petitioned for navigational markers to be placed on rocks and islands surrounding Marblehead and Salem harbors, as Reverend Williams Bentley notes in his diary on July 23, 1806: "Marblehead will petition for...eastern rock of Cat Island, & [other nearby rocks]...a poplar [has been planted] on Marblehead rock having found a depth of soil in a spot of 5 feet [1.5 m]. Eastern rock of Cat Island admits trees also and three have been planted" and again on Jan 29, 1807: "the Town have had a meeting upon the subject of the petition to the General Court from Marblehead to grant to their marine Society the Islands laying off that Town...They ask for E. Rock of Cat Island, [other nearby rocks]..." Chapter 0081 from the Massachusetts General Court Chap. "authorize[d] the Marine Society of the town of Marblehead, to erect Monuments and Land Marks on certain Islands and Rocks on the Sea Coast of the town of Marblehead.

Sect. 1. BE it enacted, by the Senate and House of Representatives in General Court assembled, and by the authority of the same, That the Marine Society of the town of Marblehead, in the county of Essex, is hereby authorized and allowed, after the passing of this act, to set out trees, and to erect monuments or land marks, on Ram Island, Tinker's Islands, Marblehead Rock, and Cat Island Rock, and to preserve the same.

Sect. 2. Be it further enacted by the authority aforesaid, That if any person or persons shall, on said Islands or Rocks, mar, injure, or deface, any of the trees or buildings aforesaid, or do any other injury to the aforementioned places or land marks, every such person or persons, shall severally forfeit and pay, for each, and every offence, the sum of twelve dollars, to the use of the Marine Society aforesaid, to be recovered by special action on the case, before any court proper to try the same.

Sect. 3. And be it further enacted by the authority aforesaid, That if any person or persons shall take away from the Islands and Rocks aforesaid, any earth, stones, or gravel, each and every person so offending, shall forfeit and pay as a fine, to the use of the Marine Society of Marblehead, as aforesaid, the sum of twelve dollars, for each ton of earth, stones, or gravel, so taken away, and so in proportion for any greater or less quantity, to be recovered as aforesaid.

A navigational beacon was erected on the rock according to the 9th (1817) edition of the American Coast Pilot "the Marblehead Marine Society has erected on Cat island rock, a spar 40 feet [12 m] high, to the top of which is annexed a cask of about 130 gallons [490 L; 110 imp gal] measure, which is seen at sea 20 or 30 feet [6 or 9 m] above the land", which was not mentioned in the 5th (1806) edition. At the top of the rock, a date of 1808 is engraved, but no evidence of a structure exists today. This is the likely date and location of the spar described.
