= Cormorant Rock, County Antrim =

Townland in County Antrim, Northern Ireland

Cormorant Rock
- Townland
- County: County Antrim
- Country: Northern Ireland
- Sovereign state: United Kingdom

Cormorant Rock is a townland in County Antrim, Northern Ireland.
