= Sea air =

Air at or by the sea

Sea air has traditionally been thought to offer health benefits associated with its unique odor, which is caused by dimethyl sulfide, released by microbes.

Salts generally do not dissolve in air, but can be carried by sea spray in the form of particulate matter.

In the early 19th century, a lower prevalence of disease in coastal regions or islands was attributed to the sea air. Such medical beliefs were translated into the literature of Jane Austen and other authors. Victorians mistakenly attributed the odor of sea air to ozone.

Later that century, such beliefs led to the establishment of seaside resorts for the treatment of tuberculosis, with medical belief in its efficacy continuing into the 20th century. However, the quality of sea air was often degraded by pollution from wood- and coal-burning ships. Today those fuels are gone, replaced by high sulphur oil in diesel engines, which generate sulphate aerosols.
