= Marblehead Harbor =

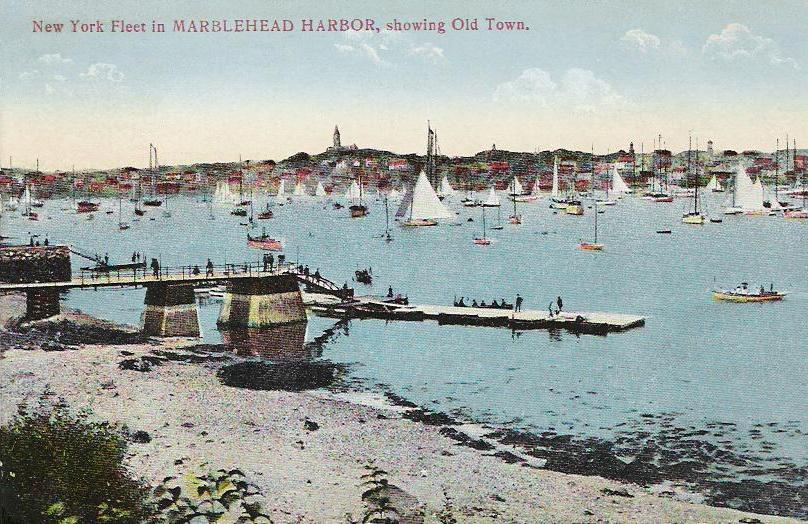
- The harbor, in 1908
- Interactive map of Marblehead Harbor
- Location of the Harbor in Massachusetts

Location
- Country: United States
- Location: Marblehead, Massachusetts
- Coordinates: 42°30′2.47″N 70°50′41.25″W

Marblehead Harbor is a harbor located in Marblehead, Massachusetts, 17 miles northeast of Boston. It is considered the birthplace of the Continental Navy, forerunner of the United States Navy, and of United States Marine Corps Aviation.

== Description ==
Marblehead Harbor is located to the east of the town's center. To the south is an isthmus that connects the town to Marblehead Neck, which is located on the eastern side of the harbor. The harbor is home to many yachts and also a fishing community, which has increased over the years. There are 2,000 moorings and the harbor contains 14.2 miles of tidal coastline. For a number of years, the Burgess Company was located along the shores of the harbor. Fort Sewall is also located along the northwestern edge of the harbor.

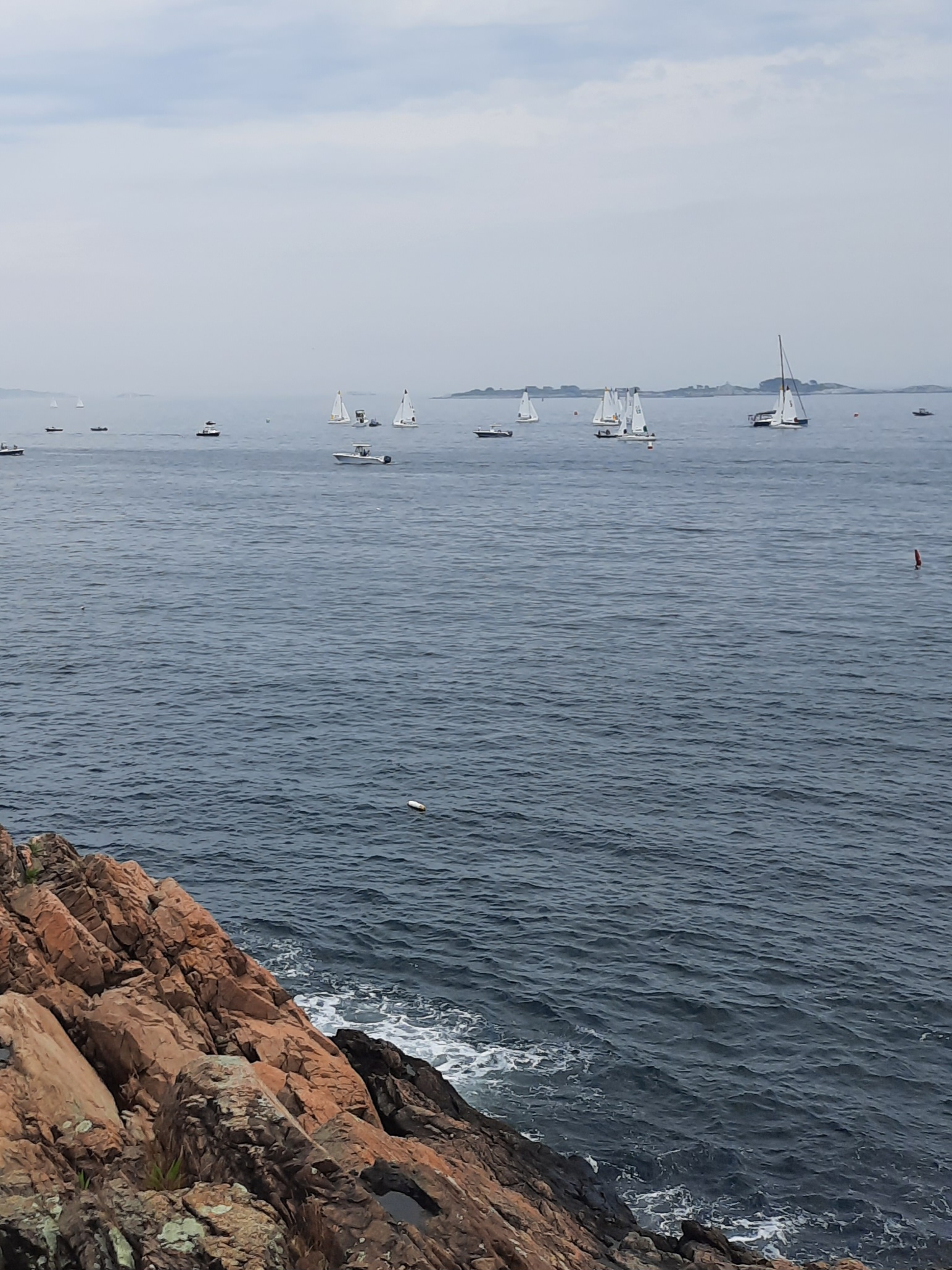
View from Fort Sewall Marblehead MA June 2024

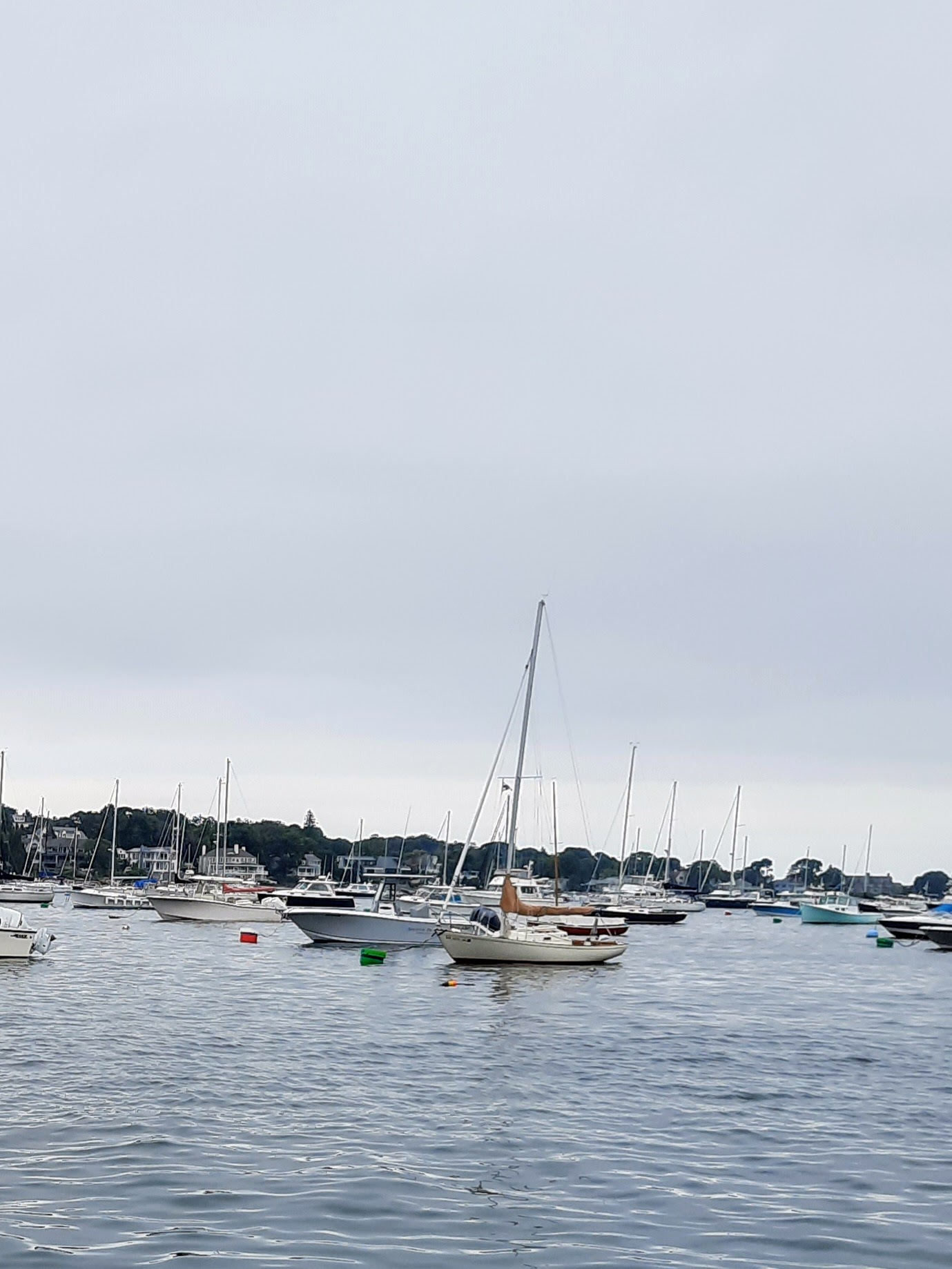
Marblehead Harbor MA June 2024

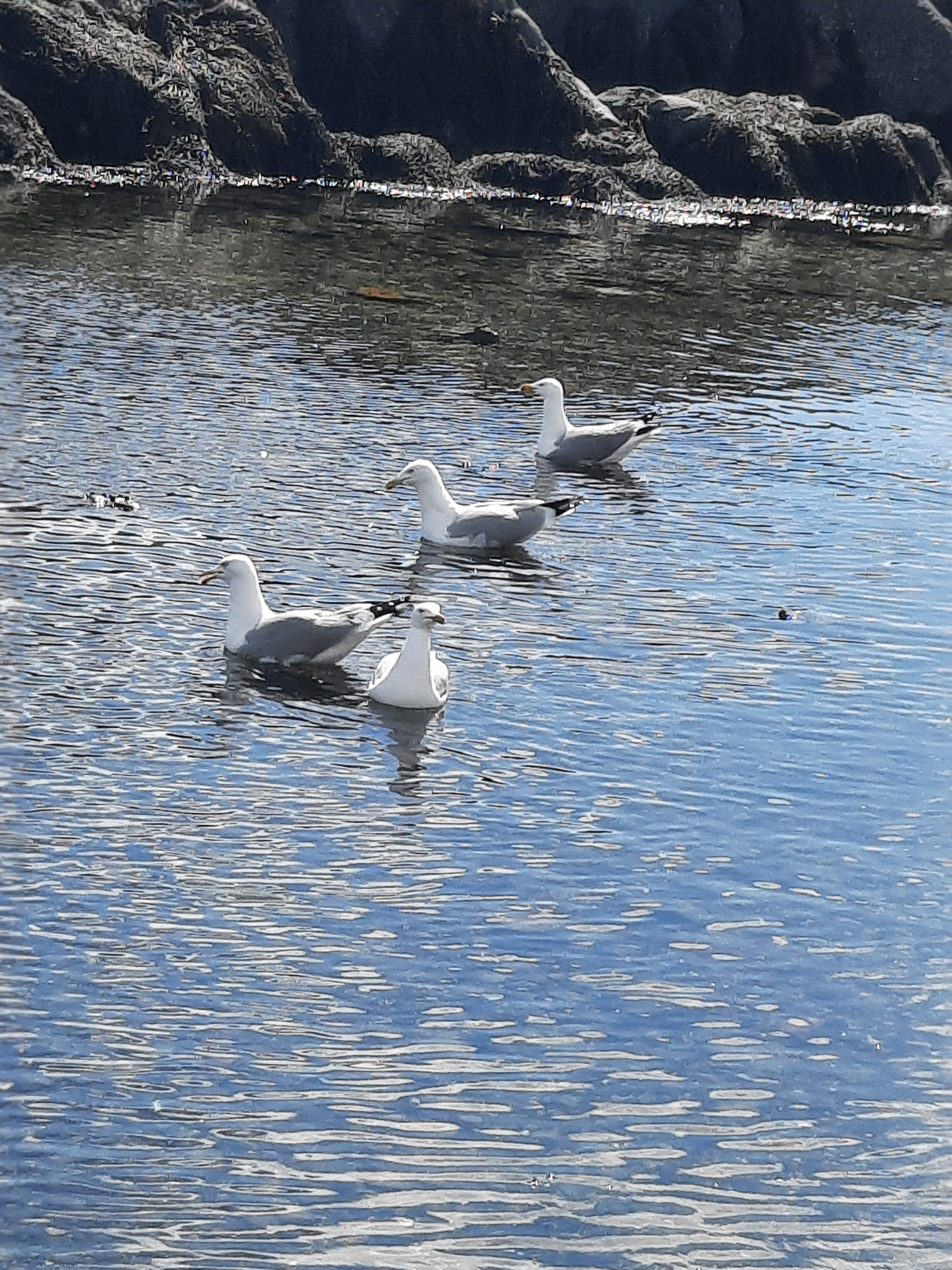
Seagulls Marblehead Harbor Spring 2024

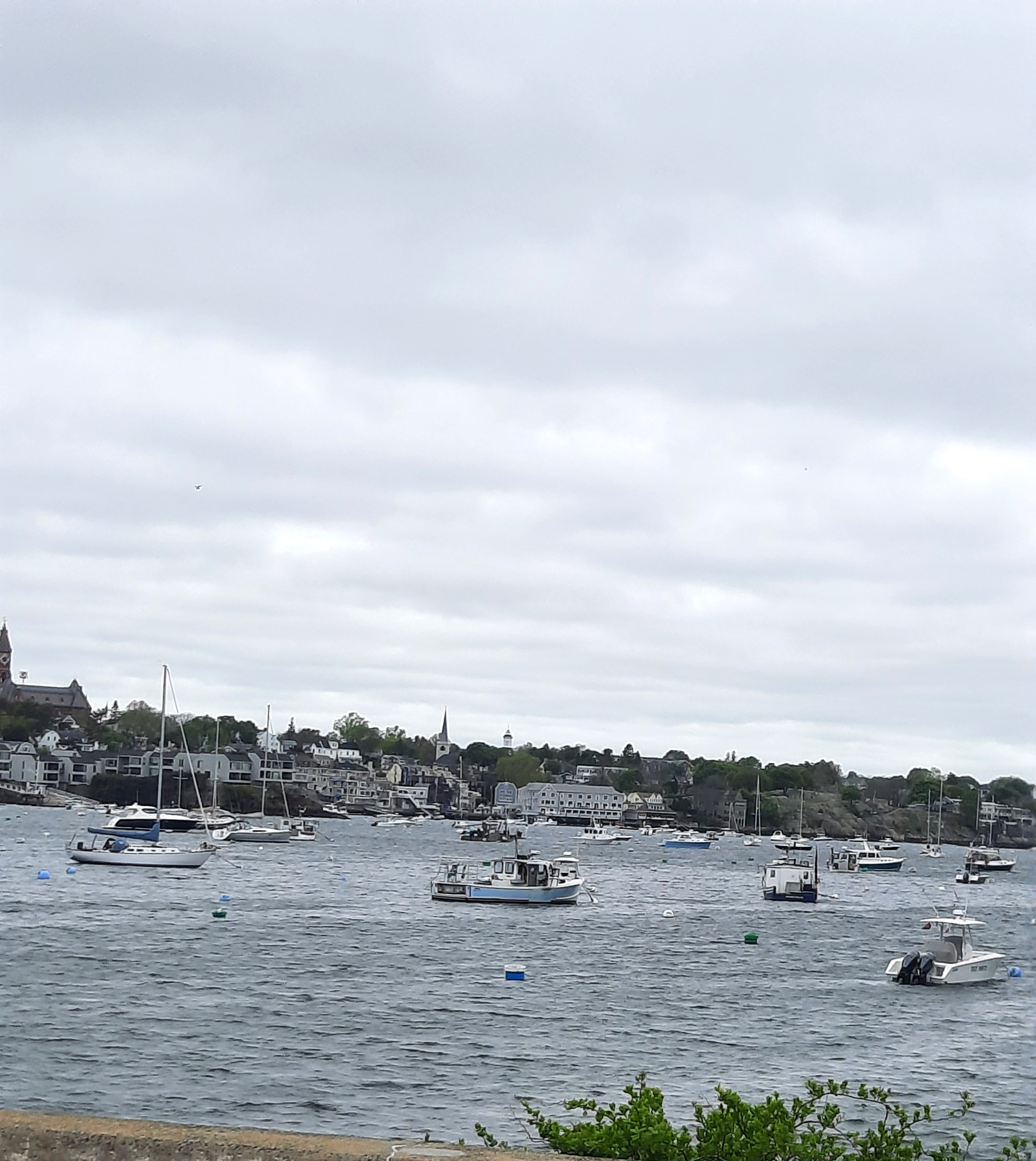
Marblehead Harbor from Causeway June 2024

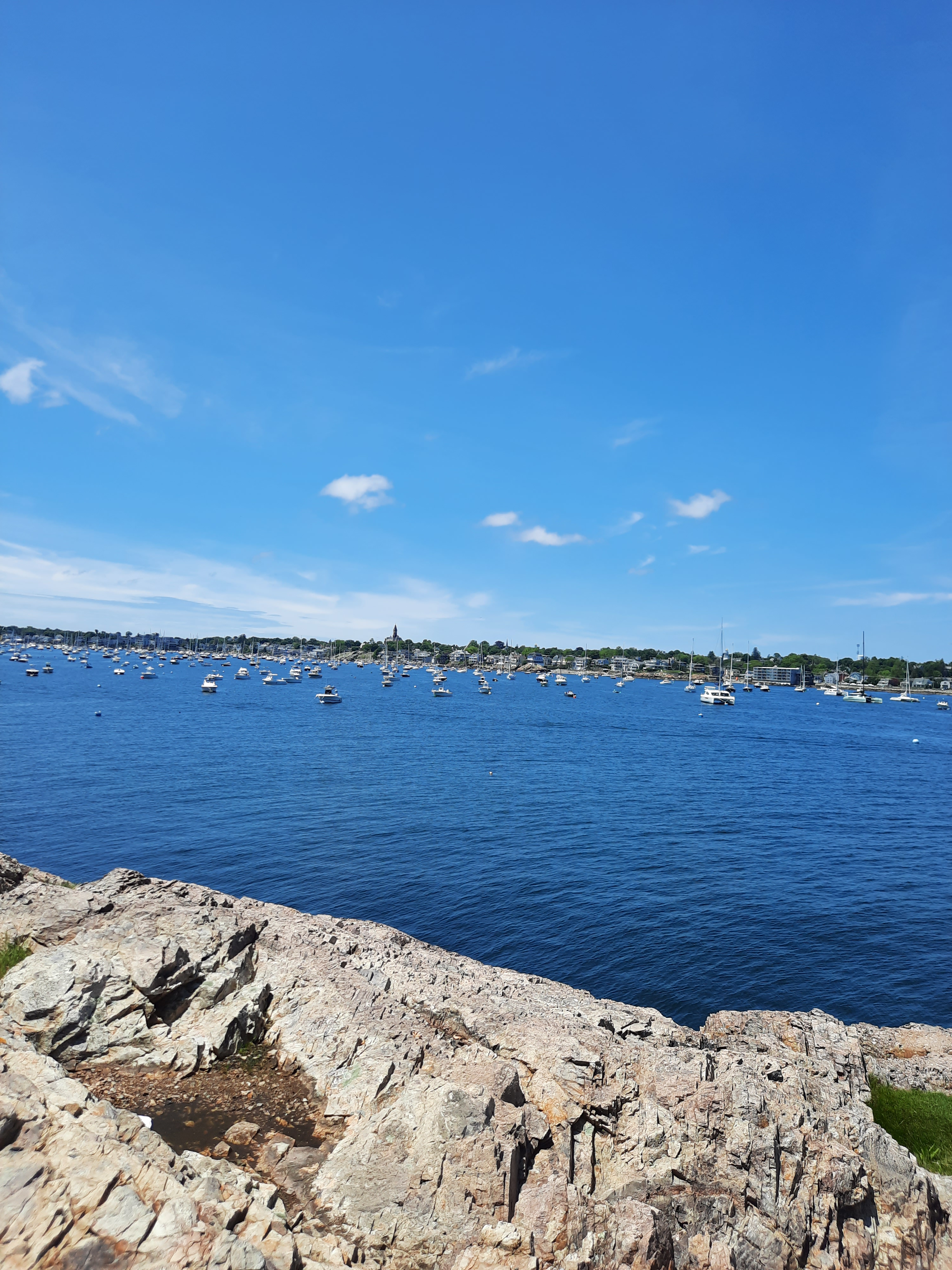
Marblehead Harbor from Lighthouse Summer

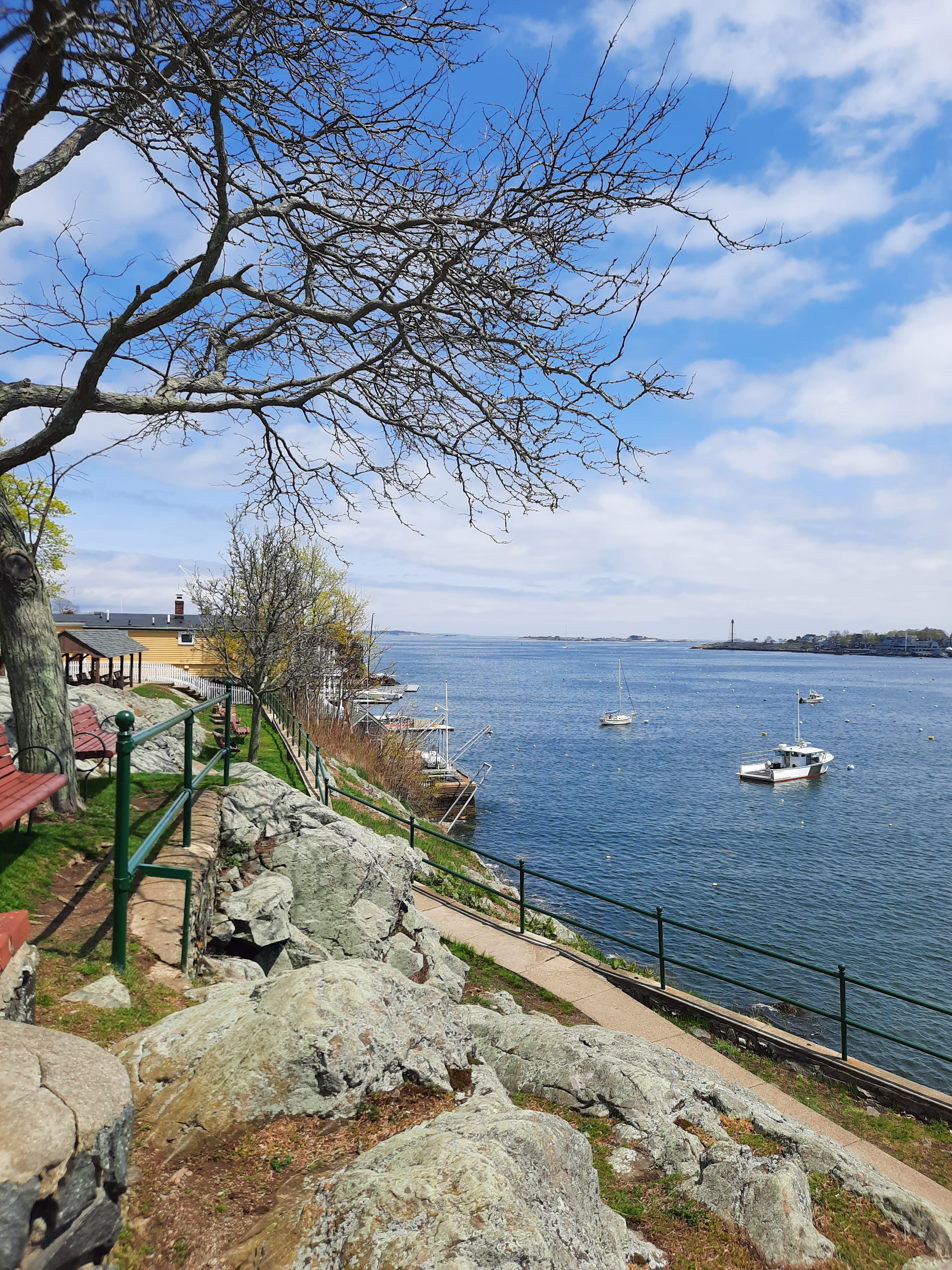
Marblehead Harbor from Crocker Park Spring

== Military history ==
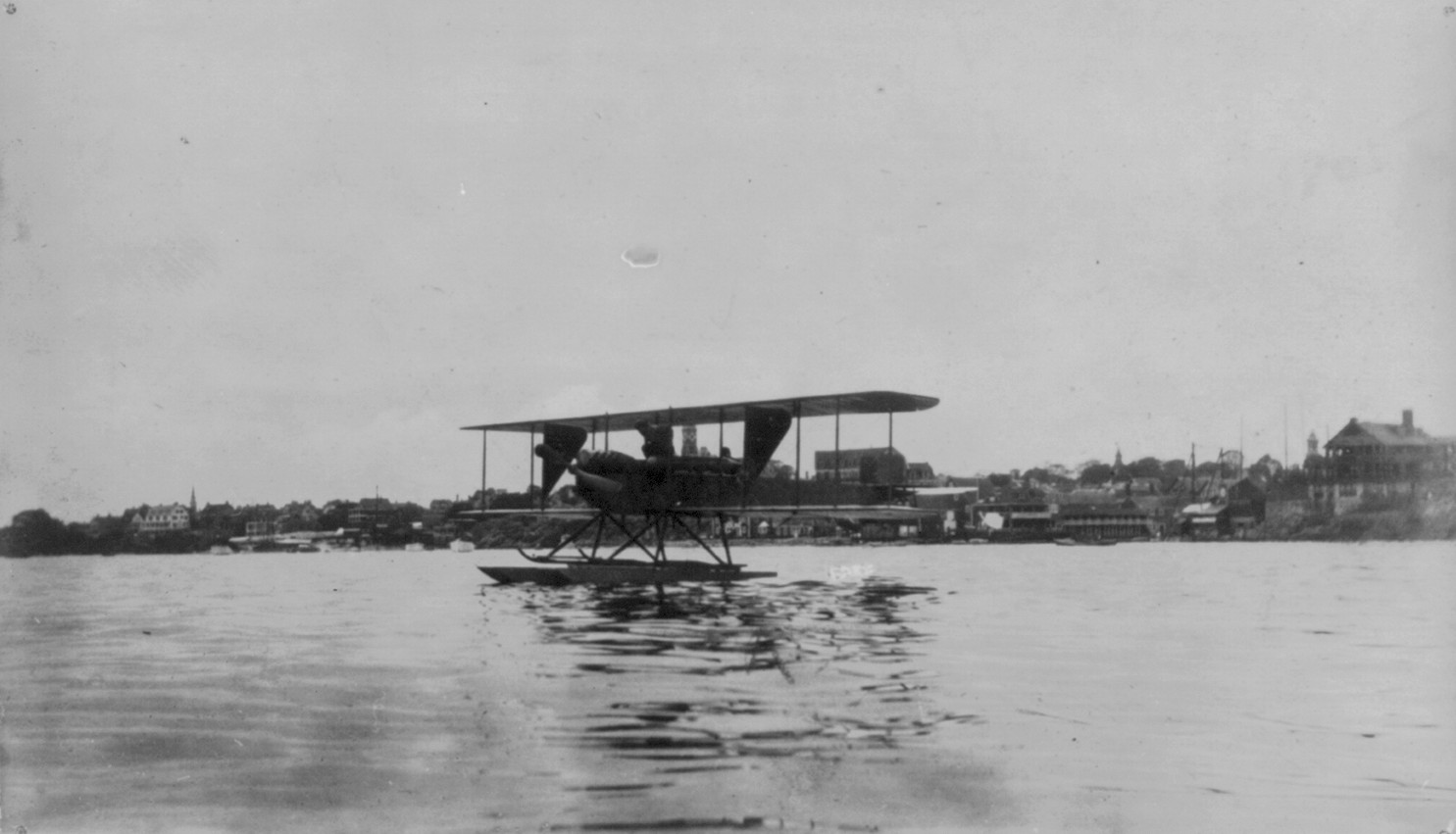
A Burgess Model H, in 1913

Marblehead Harbor has a distinguished military history as well. It was the home port of the schooner Hannah, the first armed vessel of the Continental Navy, and her original owner and master and most of her crew were from Marblehead. A diary entry by a local sailmaker records her sailing on her first military expedition during the American Revolution, under the command of John Glover; the birth of what was to become the United States Navy. The ship was equipped with cannon and with provisions including the indigenous "Joe Frogger" molasses/sea water cookie. The nautical backgrounds of the crew were instrumental in helping the colonists during various sea campaigns during the course of the war.

On 20 August 1912, Alfred Austell Cunningham became the first Marine aviator, taking off from Marblehead Harbor in a Burgess Model H seaplane given to him by the Burgess Company. His flight began the era of United States Marine Corps Aviation.

In 1915, Naval Training Station Marblehead was opened, operating until 1917. The station was the first air station in the state, and trained units from all over the region.

In July 1997, the USS Constitution was moored overnight in Marblehead Harbor.
