= George R. Fearing =

American athlete (1871–1956)

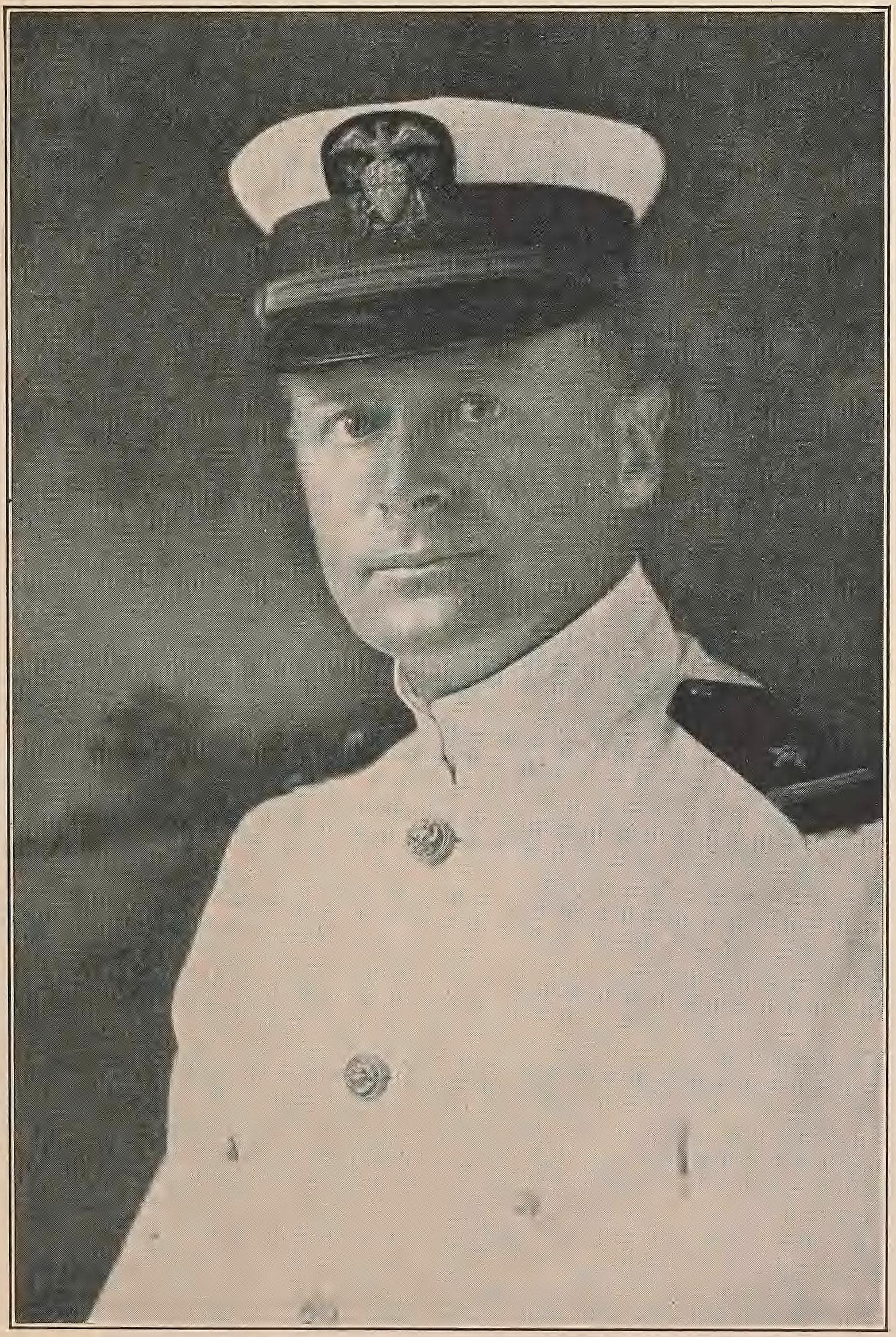

Personal information
- Born: February 20, 1871 New York City, U.S.
- Died: June 15, 1956 (aged 85) Westwood, Massachusetts, U.S.
- Education: Harvard College; Harvard Law School
- Occupation(s): Lawyer; Investment banker Hospital administrator
- Spouse: Hester Sullivan Cochrane (m. 1897)
- Children: George Fearing III
- Parent(s): George and Harriet (Travers) Fearing
- Relative: William R. Travers (grandfather)

Sport
- Sport: High jump Court tennis Rackets; American football

George Richmond Fearing Jr. (February 20, 1871 – June 15, 1956) was an American athlete, investment banker, and hospital president who held the men's high jump indoor world record from 1891 to 1893 and was a national champion in real tennis and rackets.

== Early life ==
Fearing was born in New York City on February 20, 1871, to George Richmond and Harriet (Travers) Fearing. He prepared for college at the Cutler School.

== Athletics ==
Fearing attended Harvard College and was a member of the Harvard football team in 1889. He played in the 1897 École des Beaux-Arts vs. Académie Julian football game, which is considered the first American football game ever played in Europe.

Fearing won the high jump at the 1890 and 1891 Boston Athletic Association Indoor Games. His 1891 mark of 1.89 was a world record that would stand until it was broken by Michael Sweeney in 1893.

Fearing competed in the 1887, 1889, 1891, and 1892 U.S. National Championships. His best performance came in 1887, when he made it to the quarterfinals before losing to Henry Slocum. Fearing made it to the finals of the national court tennis tournament in 1895, 1897, 1899, winning in 1897.

In 1905, he and Hugh D. Scott defeated Quincy Shaw and H. H. Hunnewell to win the national doubles racquet championship. They repeated in 1906, this time beating Lawrence Waterbury and Charles Sands. They were finalists again in 1909, but lost to Shaw and Percy Haughton. In 1911, they captured their third title by defeating William Payne Whitney and M. S. Barger in the finals. In 1913, Fearing, now partnered with Quincy Shaw, again made the finals, but lost to his former partner, Hugh Scott, and Percy Haughton. Fearing and Scott returned to the finals in 1914, but lost to Dwight F. Davis and Joseph Wear.

In 1912, Fearing and Joshua Crane made it to the finals of the national amateur court tennis doubles championship, but lost to Jay Gould and W. H. T. Huhn. Fearing and C. T. Russell made the finals of the 1914 tournament, but again lost to Gould and Huhn. The following year, Fearing and Gould were again defeated by Gould and Huhn in the finals. Fearing and Gould were finalists in 1921, but lost to the defending champions, Jay Gould and Joseph Wear. Fearing made the 1922 finals with D. P. Rhodes, but lost a second time to Gould and Joseph Wear.

== Business ==
Fearing graduated from Harvard College in 1893 and Harvard Law School in 1896. After law school, he worked in the law office of R. M. Saltonstall in Boston. He later worked for the investment firm Jackson & Curtis, but left in 1910 to take care of his private investments. From 1910 to 1936, he was president of the Free Hospital for Women. By 1918, he was a special partner of Van Emburgh and Atterbury, a New York stockbroker.

== Military service ==
Fearing was active in the Preparedness Movement and attended the First Officers' Training Camp at Plattsburg, New York. In 1916, he enlisted in the aviation section of the Massachusetts Naval Militia and trained at Marblehead, Massachusetts. In 1916, he received flying instruction at the Massachusetts State Militia Aviation Camp on Great Misery Island. In 1917, he was elected to the Massachusetts Public Safety Committee and served as head of aviation section on the committee on naval affairs.

On May 7, 1917, he left the naval militia and enrolled in U.S. Naval Reserve Force as an Ensign. He was ordered overseas on August 16, 1917, and was put in charge of the American aviators training at the French flying school in Gironde. Later that year, he was transferred to the U.S. Naval Aviation Headquarters in Paris. He was commissioned a Lieutenant (junior grade) on February 1, 1918, and promoted to Lieutenant a month later. He was made liaison officer with United States Army Air Service and later made Chief of Aviation, U.S. Naval Aviation Foreign Service. He was transferred to London when the U.S. Naval Aviation Headquarters was moved there and was the head of the planning section there. He was promoted to Lieutenant commander on September 30, 1918, and was placed on inactive duty on January 14, 1919.

== Personal life ==
On May 12, 1897, Fearing married Hester Sullivan Cochrane in Boston. Their son, George III, was born the following year. They maintained a home on Beacon Street in Boston's Back Bay and another in Westwood, Massachusetts.

Fearing died on June 15, 1956, in Westwood, Massachusetts.

Records
Preceded by (United States) William Byrd-Page	Men's High Jump Indoor World Record Holder; February 14, 1891 – February 17, 1893	Succeeded by (United States) Michael Sweeney
