= Joyce Rey =

American real estate agent

- Born: Joyce Bowman
- Occupation: Luxury real estate agent
- Years active: 1973 to present
- Spouse: Alejandro Rey (m. 1969; div. 1980)
- Children: 1
- Website: www.joycerey.com

Joyce Rey is a Beverly Hills-based luxury real estate agent who heads the Global Luxury division for Coldwell Banker. She is considered one of the most successful real estate agents in the United States and has represented clients for homes that include Pickfair, the Owlwood Estate, Le Belvedere and Greenacres.

== Career ==
Rey was an educator at Susan Miller Dorsey High School, teaching business law during the 1960s. She moonlighted as a flight attendant where she met her husband Alejandro Rey and became interested in real estate while the two were looking for houses together. Rey began her career in real estate in 1973 and is known for representing celebrity clients and high-end real estate. One of her first sales was to Christina Onassis in 1974. A sale to Lee Strasberg in 1976 is what Rey credits as her "breakthrough deal," landing her deals that included selling the Pickfair and Owlwood Estate in the 1970s.

=== Real estate ===
In 1979 she founded Rodeo Realty, a real estate firm that sold only $1 million plus properties. She was recruited by Harleigh Sandler to form Rodeo Realty as a division of the company, which was later sold to Merrill Lynch in 1982.

Rey has set records with many of her sales. In 1978 she became the first agent to sell a home worth $4 million which was double the highest price paid for any property in the Platinum Triangle. The house was owned by Sonny & Cher. In the 1990s, Rey was the buyer and seller agent on a $30 million property which recognized as the highest selling property in Bel Air for that decade. Rey is credited with selling the highest priced residential property in the United States in 2010 which was listed for $72 million. She sold $300 million worth of property with Coldwell Banker Previews International in 2014, and more than $4 billion in her career through 2019.

Rey has been recognized as one of the 100 most influential Angelenos by Haute Living and one of the 35 most influential people in luxury real estate by Unique Homes. She has also been recognized as a top real estate agent for the entertainment industry by publications such as The Hollywood Reporter and Variety. She has twice sold homes that were at the time valued as the most expensive home in the United States. They were (the Owlwood Estate in 1978 and La Belvedere in 2010).
