= Platinum Triangle =

Platinum Triangle can refer to:

- Platinum Triangle, Anaheim, California
- Platinum Triangle, Los Angeles
