= Martha's Vineyard in World War II =

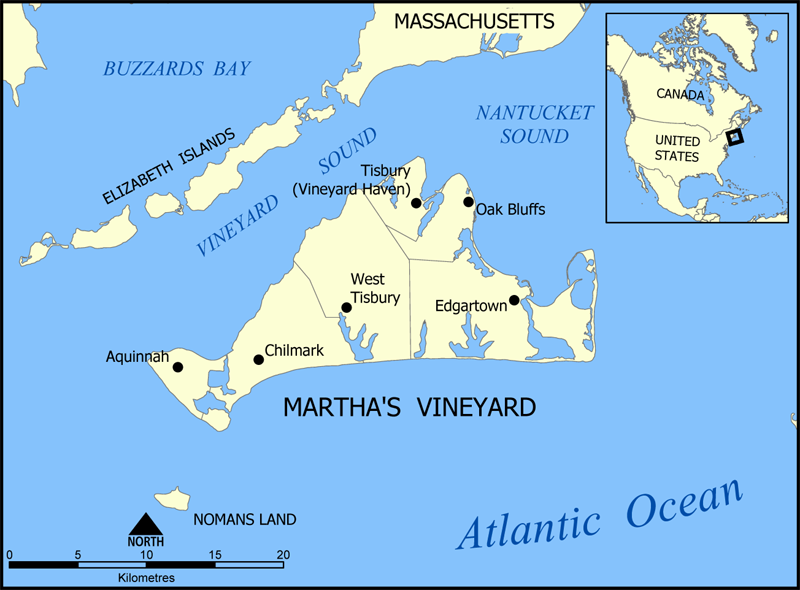
Map of Martha's Vineyard and Nomans Land

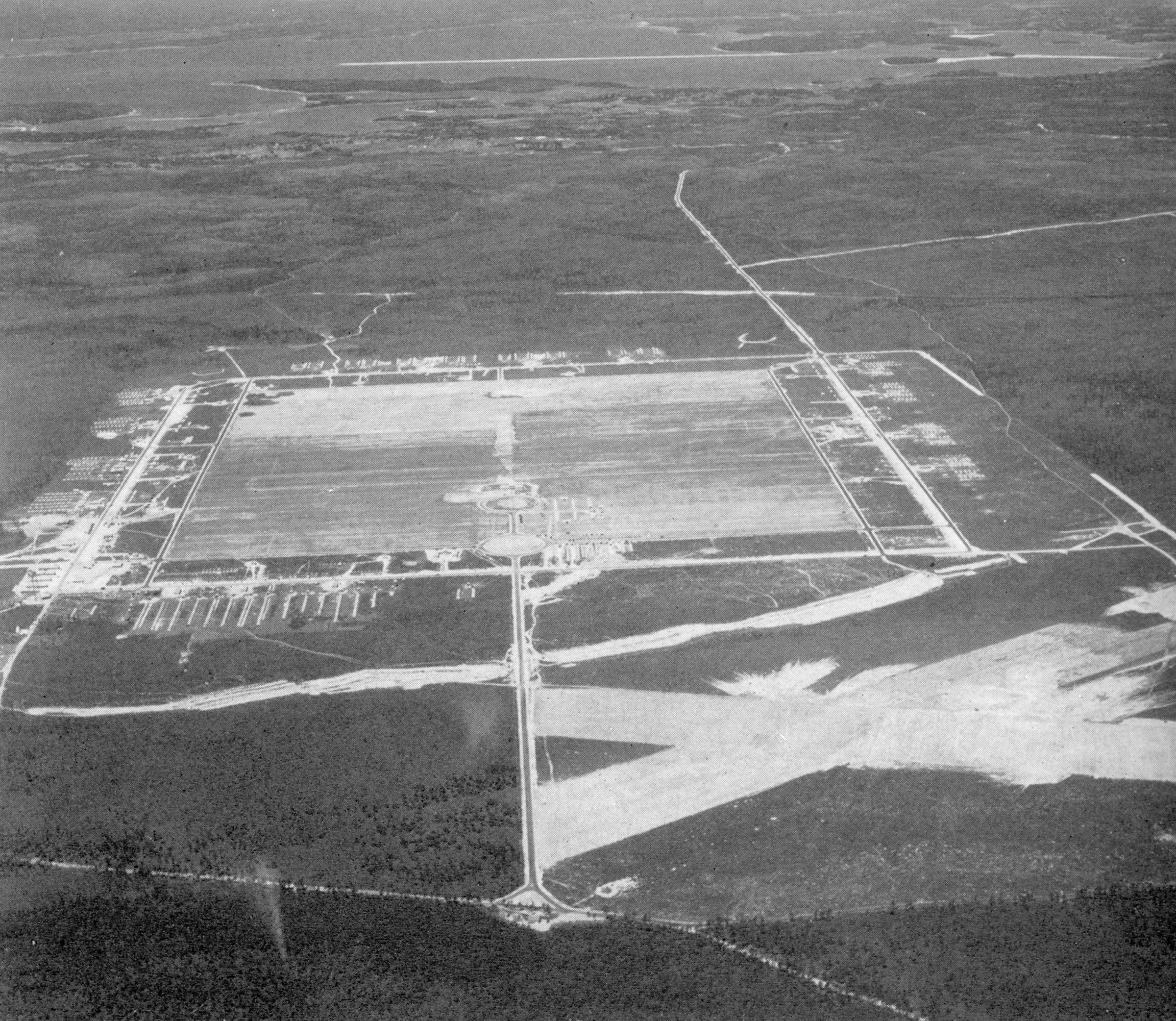
Camp Edwards 1940s

Martha's Vineyard was founded in 1602 and became a popular summertime location. Year round it is home to a population of around 10,000 people and in the summertime it spikes to over 100,000 people. In World War II the people that flocked to Martha's Vineyard were soldiers. With Camp Edwards being on Cape Cod, Martha's Vineyard became used as a training ground for the soldiers. Martha's Vineyard was used by the Army, Navy and Army Air Forces (which were then still part of the Army) from 1941 through 1945 with training missions that ranged from landings on beaches, climbing cliffs and bombing practice.

== Army ==
Stationed at Camp Edwards, the United States Army used Martha's Vineyard to train and practice beach landings and beach assaults. The U.S. Army took part in missions where they loaded up boats with the soldiers, supplies and ammunitions on the Cape, and would then sail across the channel, around the Vineyard and then land on the beaches. Once landed, the troops would have to safely exit the landing crafts and remove the supplies as well. While doing so, another group of troops was positioned in the woods and on the Gay Head Cliffs of Martha's Vineyard in order to simulate live gunfire and bombing rounds. The soldiers who landed on the beach would then have to move up and clear the woods and take control of the beach. These missions were created to simulate the planned landings on the beaches of Normandy during D-Day. If the troops were unable to complete these missions they would not be allowed to ship out and take part in the storming of the beaches in Normandy.

Another practice mission that the U.S. Army did to prepare for storming the beaches was practicing climbing the Gay Head Cliffs. The United States Military had knowledge of the cliffs that Normandy had on some of their beaches, specifically Pointe Du Hoc. Again the soldiers would boat over from Camp Edwards and then land on the beach before the cliff. They then had to move up towards the cliffs while under simulated gunfire. The soldiers then had to successfully climb up the cliff. Once at the top they were tasked with taking out fake enemy outposts to seize control of the cliff and allow the rest of the troops onto the beach. This mission prepared the soldiers for capturing Pointe Du Hoc and has been credited with being what led the soldiers to so much success in the actual taking of Pointe Du Hoc.

A small island off the southern coast of Martha's Vineyard known as "Nomans Land" also played a vital role in World War II training. Noman's Land was purchased by the United States military to use as a bombing target. The soldiers were sent to Martha's Vineyard and were told to go to specific locations on the island, primarily on the beaches. Once in position, the soldiers were tasked with setting up mortars and dialing the mortars on to No Man's Land. After the mortars were dialed in, the soldiers used Noman's Land as a practice target area to gain essential experience. These missions took place at all different times of the day and in all different weather conditions. This was so the soldiers would be prepared for any weather condition they would face when landing in Normandy.

== Navy ==
For the Navy, their training in Martha's Vineyard consisted mostly of assisting the Army in their maneuvers. Martha's Vineyard has many beaches, some of which have very calm waters and others that are known for waves of up to five feet. With the varying water conditions, these beaches gave the Navy plenty of practice for driving the boats in rough and uncontrollable water conditions. This practice allowed for the captains of the boats to test their limits and be able to safely land their boats on the beaches. Once on shore, the naval units joined in with the Army and participated in the capture of the beaches.

The Navy also took advantage of Nomans Land. They would practice launching mortars from their small launching boats as well as from their bigger gunboats, carriers and destroyers. This bombing practice continued for more than 40 years and has lasting effects until today. Although Noman's Land is considered a wildlife refuge now there are still live munitions littered on the island, some of which regularly wash up on shore at the beaches of Martha's Vineyard.

=== Collaboration with the Army Air Forces ===
One of the bigger missions the Navy took part in was submarine destruction. Together with the Army Air Forces, the Navy partook in locating and destroying submarines that were found off the coast of Martha's Vineyard, Nantucket and Cape Cod. The Army Air Forces were responsible for flying and trying to locate submarines through the air while the Navy tried locating them while sailing around the waters. Once located, the Naval ships had to track down and destroy or deter the submarines from the waters around Massachusetts.

== Army Air Forces ==
The Army Air Forces mainly used Martha's Vineyard Airport. They used the airport for new pilot training and for aircraft carrier training. Aircraft carrier training meant that they put a marker on the runway to shorten the distance to be the length of the deck of an aircraft carrier. This teaches pilots how to gain the most speed in the shortest possible time to be able to pull up and take off from an aircraft carrier, which is a very important task.

Once airborne these pilots would then take advantage of Nomans land the same way the Army and Navy did. They would fly around Martha's Vineyard and practice making bombing runs on Nomans land. Some of these practice bombs being powerful enough to leave a 3 foot wide by 3 foot deep crater on the island. These bombing runs, like all of the other training done on Martha's Vineyard was all for preparation to storm the beaches of Normandy.

== Island assault ==
In one joint training mission with the Army, Navy and Army Air Forces, they simulated a takeover of the island. In preparing to do so they acted as if the island was held by German troops and they needed to infiltrate the island and capture it. To make things as realistic as possible the beaches were covered with barbed wire, beach obstacles and demolitions were planted on the beaches and also further inland. The demolitions were set up to replicate naval gunfire support, artillery and land mines. Along with these obstacles the 75th Composite Infantry Training Battalion was sent to the island beforehand to act as the German troops and to try to defend the island. The 75th Training Battalion did not have many soldiers in their unit, so umpires and flags were also used to simulate Germans.

To assault the island, one Air Force company of parachute infantry from Fort Bragg, North Carolina, was directed to parachute onto the island near the airport at E-hour or 6 am. Once on the ground their job was to take control of the airport and set up an operating base as they would in a real-life scenario. As this was going on the Army and Navy are directed to send troops to land by boat, clear the beaches and then move inward to help seize the airport.

== British involvement ==
When stationed at Camp Edwards, the U.S. troops were trained by their superiors and also by a group of British soldiers. They British soldiers came from the Number 1 Commandos, Suffolk Regiment, the Royal Armoured Corps, the Royal Navy and the Royal Corps of Signals. These elite British soldiers trained the U.S. troops in hand-to-hand combat, military strategies and also ran through their training missions with them.

== Bibliography ==
- Becker, Marshall O. The Amphibious Training Center. Washington, D.C.: Historical Section, Army Ground Forces, 1946. Print.
- Dresser, Tom, Herbert L. Foster, and Jay Schofield. Martha's Vineyard in World War II. N.p.: n.p., n.d. Print.
- Dresser, Tom. Martha's Vineyard: A History. N.p.: n.p., n.d. Print.
- "The Invasion of Martha's Vineyard." Marthas Vineyard Times. Martha's Vineyard Times, 26 Nov. 2013. Web. 22 Mar. 2016.
- Leaning, John. "Practice Ground." Capecodtimes.com. Local Media Group, 6 June 2004. Web. 22 Mar. 2016.
- "Martha's Vineyard Museum Exhibitions." Martha's Vineyard Museum Exhibitions. Martha's Vineyard Museum, n.d. Web. 22 Mar. 2016.
- Miner, T. Richardson. "The Impact of World War II on Soldiers, Scientists, Civilians and the Town of Falmouth." (n.d.): n. pag. Woods Hole Museum. Woods Hole Museum. Web. 22 Mar. 2016.
- "NAVY BOMB SITE RATTLES THE VINEYARD." The New York Times. The New York Times, 23 May 1987. Web. 22 Mar. 2016.
