= 1897 École des Beaux-Arts vs. Académie Julian football game =

- First American football game in Europe
École des Beaux-Arts	Académie Julian
(0–0)	(0–0)
- Date: November 25, 1897
- Season: 1897
- Location: Paris, France

The 1897 École des Beaux-Arts vs. Académie Julian football game was a college football game between American students of the École des Beaux-Arts and the Académie Julian, played on Thanksgiving Day November 25, 1897 at 2:30 pm in Levallois near Paris, France. Considered the first American football game ever played in Europe. The game was promoted by Robert D. Farquhar and was played on the grounds owned by the Racing Club de France.

== The Teams ==
The teams were to consist of American students, mostly architects, lived in Paris.

- Robert D. Farquhar, Harvard, '94, quarterback and captain;
- Joseph Howland Hunt, Harvard, '93, center;
- H. G. Acken, Columbia, '94, left guard;
- Charles Merrick Gay, Harvard, '93, right tackle;
- Samuel Lendall Pitts, Harvard, '97, left end;
- Édouard Frère Champney, Harvard, '96, right end;
- John Harleston Parker, Harvard, '93, right halfback;
- Howard P. Greenley, Trinity, '94, left halfback;
- George Richmond Fearing, Harvard, '93, fullback;
- John S. Humphries, Technology, '95, quarterback and captain;
- Louis Warren Pulsifer, Columbia, '91, right guard;
- Paul Armon Davis III, Penn, '94, left guard;
- Robert Gray Dodge, Harvard, '93, right tackle;
- Kenneth MacKenzie Murchison, Columbia, '94, left tackle;
- J. H. Lee, Yale, '95, right end;
- H. B. Hartshorn, New York, left end;
- Francke Huntington Bosworth, Yale, '97, right halfback;
- Arthur Brown, Jr., University of California, '96, left halfback,
- John P. Bakewell, Jr., University of California, '95, fullback.
