= Joshua Crane =

American athlete (1869–1964)

Personal information
- Born: October 24, 1869 Brookline, Massachusetts, U.S.
- Died: December 7, 1964 (aged 95) Santa Barbara, California, U.S.
- Education: Harvard College; Massachusetts Institute of Technology
- Occupation(s): Electrical engineer trustee treasurer
- Spouse(s): Ethel Hill (1897–1913; her death); Katherine Symes (1914–1956; her death)
- Children: 6
- Parent(s): Joshua and Anne Eliza (Jose) Crane
- Relative(s): Norman H. White (nephew); George G. Symes (father-in-law); John Foster Symes (brother-in-law)
- Coaching career

Coaching career (HC unless noted)
- 1907: Harvard

Head coaching record
- Overall: 7–3

Sport
- Sport: Court tennis Polo; Golf; Contract bridge Boat racing

Achievements and titles
- National finals: United States Court Tennis Champion (1901–1904)

Joshua Crane (October 24, 1869 – December 7, 1964) was an American athlete who participated in a number of sports, including court tennis, golf, and polo. He was a four time United States court tennis champion and was on the team that made the finals of the 1904 U.S. Open Polo Championship.

== Early life ==
Crane was born to Joshua and Anne Eliza (Jose) Crane on October 24, 1869, in Brookline, Massachusetts. He was the fourth member of his family to have the name Joshua Crane. His grandfather was an iron merchant and his father worked for Enoch and George Francis Train, the United States Department of the Treasury, and the Michigan Central and Eastern Railroads. Crane was known as Joshua Crane Jr. during his father's lifetime. He graduated from Brookline High School in 1886, Harvard College in 1890 and the Massachusetts Institute of Technology with a degree in electrical engineering in 1892.

== Tennis ==
Crane defeated O. S. Campbell in three sets to win the 1901 Racquet and Tennis Club championship. That same month he defeated Philip Stockton three games to one to win the National Court Tennis Championship. He repeated as national champion in 1902 when he defeated L. M. Stockton. The following year he defeated Charles Sands to win his third title. That winter, Sands defeated Crane in the finals of the Tuxedo Club's Gold Racquet championship. In a rematch of the 1903 finals, Crane defeated Sands to win the 1904 indoor championship. They faced off again in the 1905 national finals, but this time Sands was the victor.

In 1906, Crane was defeated in the national semi-finals by Jay Gould II. Crane returned to the final in 1907, 1909, 1910, 1911, 1912, 1913, and 1915 but was beaten by Gould each time. Crane won the tournament in 1916 and 1917, but was defeated in the challenge round by the reigning champion, Gould.

In 1914, Crane made it to the final of the British amateur court tennis championship, but lost to E. M. Baerlin. In 1915, he and George R. Fearing made it to the finals of the national amateur doubles championship, but lost to Gould and W. H. T. Huhn. In 1916 Crane lost to Clarence C. Pell in the finals of the Gold Racquet tournament. Crane made it to the finals of the national doubles championship in 1920 with C. T. Russell and in 1921 with Fearing. Both times he was defeated by Gould and Joseph Wear.

== Polo ==
Crane played polo for the Dedham Polo and Country Club, Point Judith Country Club, Meadowbrook Polo Club, Rockaway Hunting Club, and Cooperstown Country Club. He was a member of the 1904 Freebooters team that made it to the finals of the 1904 U.S. Open Polo Championship.

He also served as the referee and umpire for the International Polo Cup.

== Football ==
On March 14, 1907, Harvard Crimson football captain Bartol Parker offered Crane, who had never played football at the varsity level, the position of head coach. Crane's only previous coaching experience came in 1906, when he instructed the Harvard drop kickers during the team's practices. His one-year appointment was approved by the Harvard athletic committee on March 22, 1907. The 1907 team finished with a 7–3 and lost to Yale in that year's rivalry game. Before the start of the 1908 season, a committee of six Harvard alumni and captain Francis Burr was formed to hire a football coach and chose Percy Haughton over Crane.

== Golf ==
Crane appeared in numerous golf tournaments in the United States, France, and Great Britain. He competed in The Open Championship and played in the Amateur Championship from 1926 to 1933. In 1963, Crane, at the age of 83, won his namesake tournament at the Dedham Polo and Country Club.

== Yachting ==
Crane competed in a number of regattas hosted by the Beverly Yacht Club. He won the Buzzard's Bay championship from 1907 to 1912.

== Bridge ==
Crane's team made it to the quarterfinals of the 1933 eastern bridge championship. He was a proponent of the simple game of contract over a game of conventions and systems.

== Personal life ==
On January 18, 1897, Crane married Ethel Hill, youngest daughter of William H. Hill and heiress to 1/6 of his $4,000,000 estate. They had six children. On March 30, 1913, Crane struck a telephone pole in Middleboro, Massachusetts while driving from his home, Fox Hill Farm, in Westwood, Massachusetts to his summer home in Buzzards Bay, Massachusetts. Crane, his son Emery, and his nephew, weren't seriously injured, however Ethel Hill Crane was thrown through the windshield. She died from her injuries on April 16, 1913.

In 1914, Crane married Katherine Symes, daughter of George G. Symes, in her hometown of Denver. Her brother, John Foster Symes, was a polo teammate of Crane's. She died in 1956.

In 1914, Crane purchased No Man's Land for use as a summer home and fish and game preserve. During World War II the island was home to the No Man's Land Navy Airfield. In 1952 Crane sold the island to the United States Navy.

In 1933, Crane was a witness in the civil trial between Arthur Mason and Frederick H. Prince. Mason sought $50,000 in damages for injuries he suffered with Prince allegedly struck him with polo mallet. Although he was not present when the alleged attack took place, defense counsel James W. Sullivan called on Crane as an expert on the game of polo. The jury ruled in favor of Mason and he and Prince eventually agreed on a settlement of $15,000.

Crane was predeceased by all three of his sons. Joshua Crane Jr., was a noted aviator who died in a crash on August 28, 1935. Emery Crane, born in 1901, died in San Diego, California in an accident at the Willite Confection Company in 1924. Alexander Crane was a craftsman and artist who died in 1953.

Crane spent his later years in Santa Barbara, California. He died on December 7, 1964, at the age of 95. He was survived by daughters Priscilla Crane, Catherine Trowbridge, and Margery ter Weele.

== Head coaching record ==
Year	Team	Overall	Conference	Standing	Bowl/playoffs
Harvard Crimson (Independent) (1907)
1907	Harvard	7–3			
Harvard:		7–3			
Total:		7–3			
