= Unreal Estate: Money, Ambition, and the Lust for Land in Los Angeles =

2011 book by Michael Gross

Unreal Estate: Money, Ambition and the Lust for Land in Los Angeles
- Hardcover edition
- Author: Michael Gross
- Language: English
- Subject: History
- Genre: Non-fiction
- Set in: California
- Publisher: Broadway Books
- Publication date: November 1, 2011
- Publication place: United States
- Media type: Print, e-book
- Pages: 560
- ISBN: 978-0767932653 (hardcover edition)
- OCLC: 773579731
- Website: mgross.com/writing/books/unreal-estate/

Unreal Estate: Money, Ambition, and the Lust for Land in Los Angeles is a non-fiction book by American writer Michael Gross. The book was initially published on November 1, 2011, by Broadway Books.

== Background ==
In this book, Gross explores a cultural history of the Los Angeles-based wealthy who developed the so-called "Platinum Triangle" of Bel Air, Holmby Hills, and Beverly Hills, and other opulent neighborhoods, centering on the houses they built. Among other well-known properties are mentioned: Playboy Mansion, the former home of Hugh Hefner; Greenacres, the former home of movie star Harold Lloyd now owned by billionaire Ron Burkle; Owlwood Estate previously owned by actors Tony Curtis and Cher; and The Knoll, formerly owned by Dino De Laurentiis, Kenny Rogers, and the former 20th Century Fox owner Marvin Davis.

== Reception ==
A reviewer of Publishers Weekly stated "Gross writes with an aficionado's zeal yet chooses facts selectively for their service to the story. It may take a chapter or two to adjust to a book in which the characters, however memorable, come and go, but the landscape remains the same. However, that's the point: these houses, totems of wealth and status, inhabited for a season when their inhabitants were flush, are the real characters and mainstays of La La Land." Liana Diamond of The Hollywood Reporter mentioned "Gross explores the history of sixteen estates in Los Angeles' most exclusive neighborhoods. The book (...) not only delves into the history of some of the most coveted homes in Los Angeles but also takes a gossip- and scandal-filled look at their famous owners."

Janet Maslin of the New York Times commented "Michael Gross took a bus tour of stars' homes while researching Unreal Estate, his latest exercise in class-conscious voyeurism. That would be funny if it weren't so sad. Sure, Mr. Gross has interviewed people who live large in the gilded ghetto made up of Bel Air, Beverly Hills and Holmby Hills, a region that he actually refers to as “La-La Land.” But his reportorial position is that of a gawker-stalker whose curiosity and cupidity far outweigh his reportorial talents. What's more, he has made a career out of this."

Gross responded in several posts on his blog, Gripepad, that were then reported in the Daily News, which reprinted “anonymous third-party barbs,” wrote Frank Di Giacomo, “reviewing his reviewer.” One, attributed to a columnist at a national publication, called the article “one of the most vicious reviews ever” and asked, “What did you do to Janet Maslin? Steal her pet?”
