= Robert D. Farquhar =

American architect

Robert David Farquhar
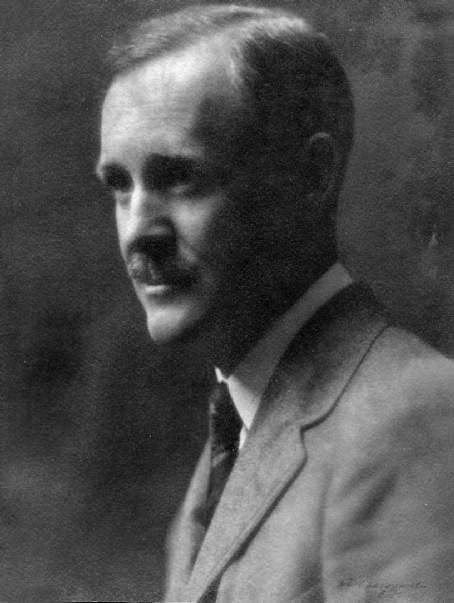
- Born: 23 February 1872; Brooklyn, New York, U.S.
- Died: 6 December 1967 (aged 95); Berkeley, California, U.S.
- Education: Harvard University, Massachusetts Institute of Technology, École des Beaux-Arts
- Occupation: Architect
- Practice: Robert D. Farquhar
- Buildings: 1906 Fenyes House; 1916 Clark Library; 1923 Canfield-Moreno Estate; 1928 Beverly Hills High School; 1930 California Club

Robert David Farquhar (23 February 1872 – 6 December 1967) was an architect who worked in California from 1905 to 1940.

== Early life ==
Farquhar was born in Brooklyn, the son of David Webber Farquhar (1844–1905) and Sarah Malvina Joslyn. He attended Phillips Exeter and Harvard (class of 1893). Farquhar completed an architectural degree at the Massachusetts Institute of Technology (1893–1895), and then attended École des Beaux-Arts in Paris (1896–1901), where he organized the first ever American football game played in Europe. He returned to New York and worked in the office of Hunt & Hunt, and of Carrère and Hastings.

== Los Angeles practice ==
Farquhar moved to Los Angeles in 1905 and practised architecture there. He was appointed a member of the architectural commission of the Panama-Pacific Exposition, held in San Francisco in 1915, and designed Festival Hall. He went to Italy with the American Red Cross in 1918, and re-opened his office in Los Angeles in 1919. The Southern California Chapter of the American Institute of Architects awarded Farquhar its Distinguished Honor Award for the William Andrews Clark Mausoleum, and Certificates of Honor for the design of the William Andrews Clark Memorial Library and the California Club. He worked with chief architect George Edwin Bergstrom on design of the Pentagon in 1941. The archives of his architectural studies and drawings are maintained at the UCLA Department of Special Collections.

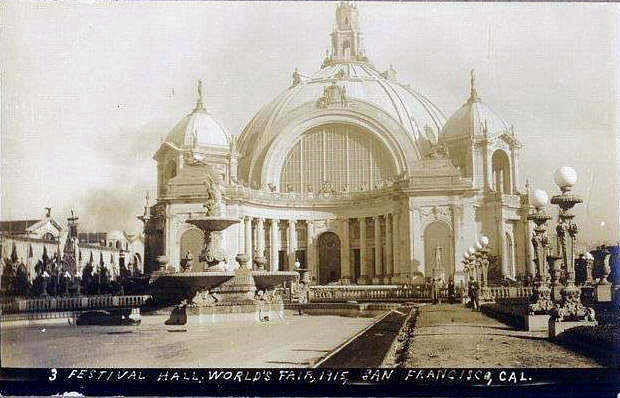
Festival Hall, 1915

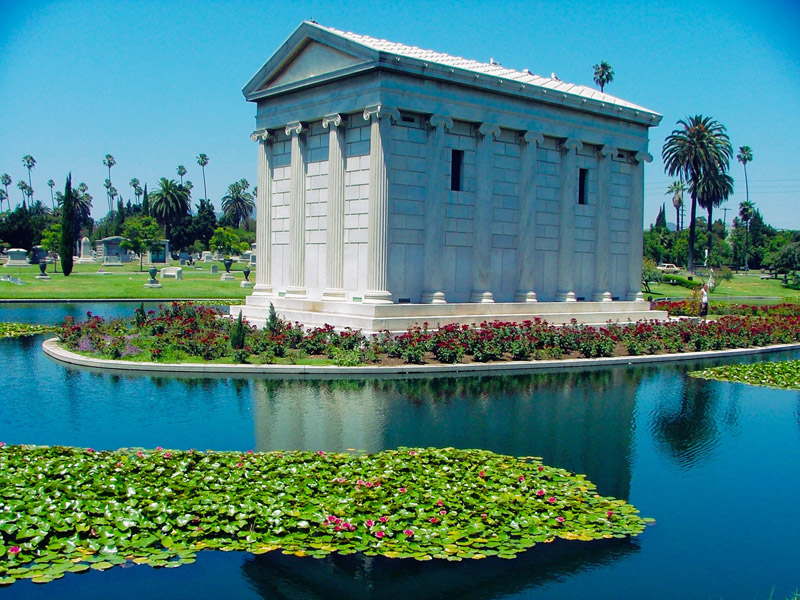
William Andrews Clark, Jr. Mausoleum, 1920

Canfield-Moreno Estate, 1923

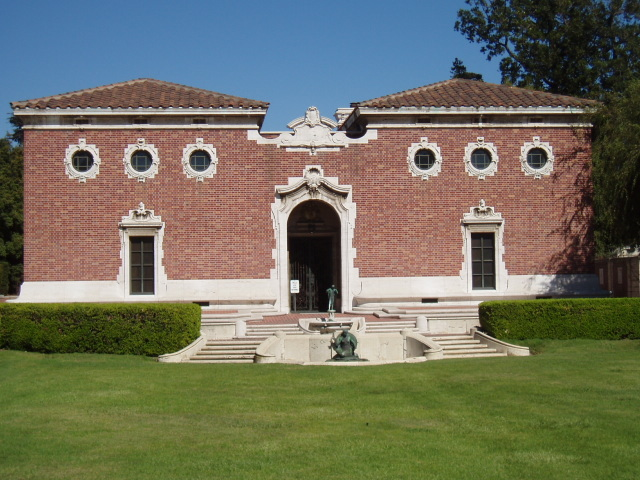
William Andrews Clark Memorial Library, 1924

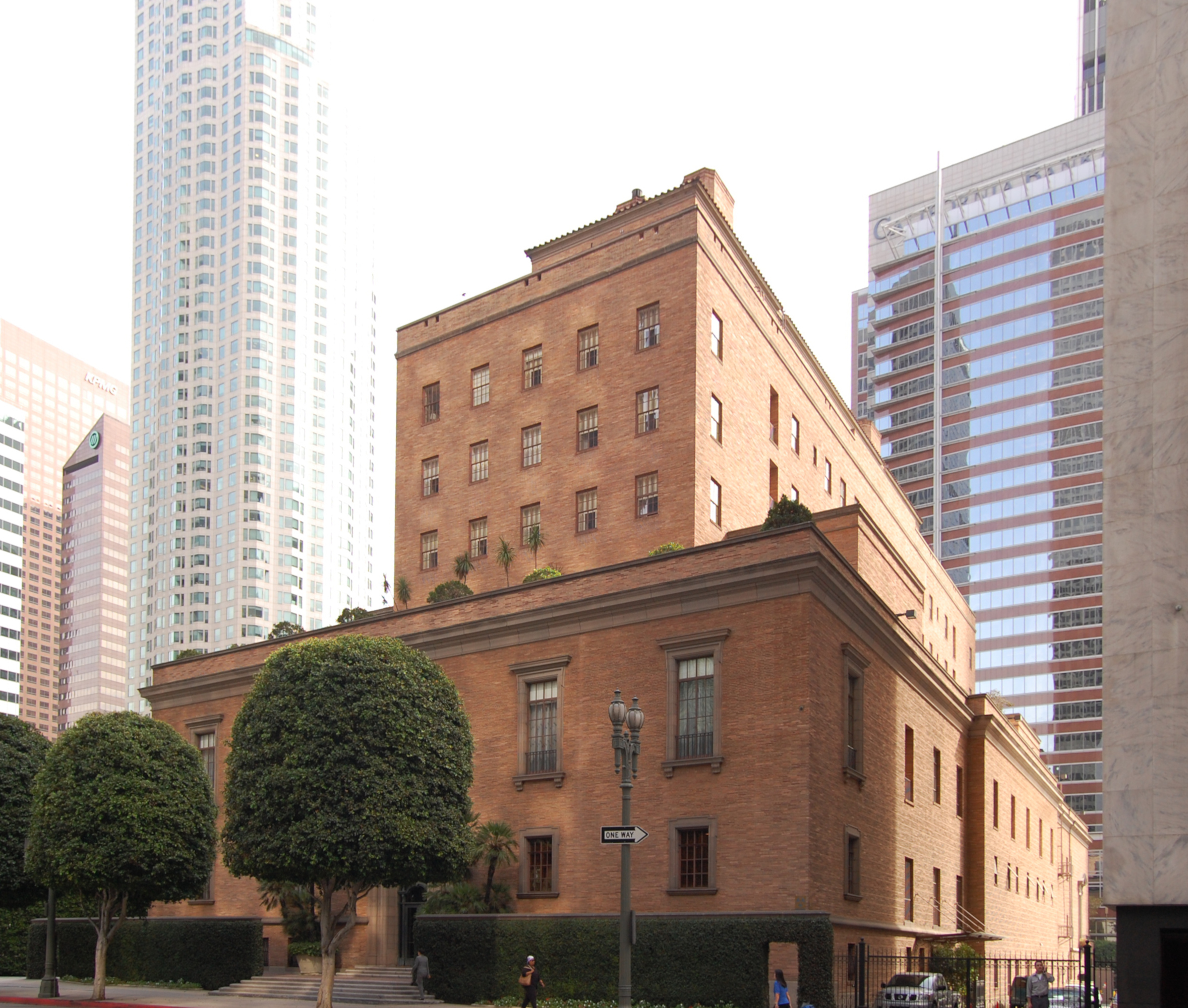
California Club, 1930

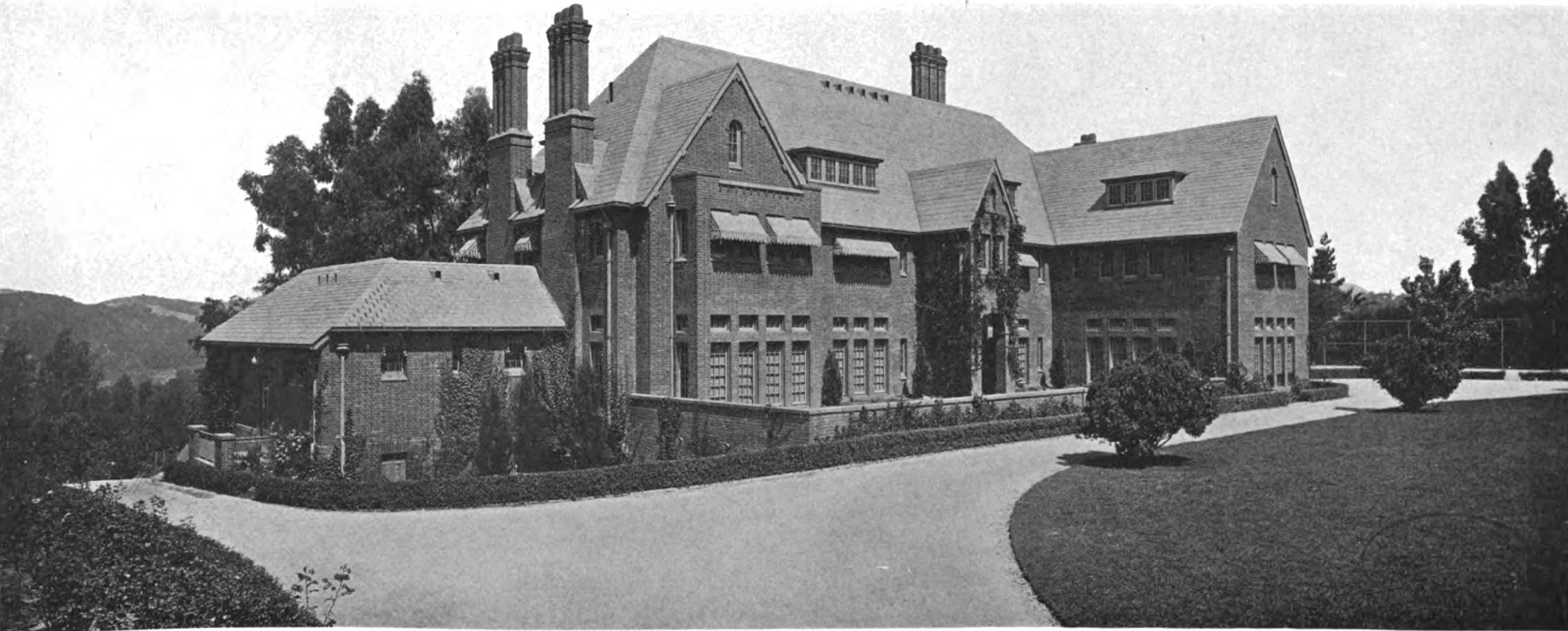
House in Pasadena, 1914

== Selected works ==
Project	Date	Address	Location
Adelbert and Eva Fenyes Residence	1906	170 N. Orange Grove Boulevard	Pasadena
Dr. R.P. McReynolds House	1908		Los Angeles
Gorham House	1910	336 Adelaide Drive	Santa Monica
Orrin Higgins House ("Villa Del Sol")	1910	1350 S. Center Street	Redlands
Henry Weyse/Charles Morris House	1910	401 Ocean Avenue	Santa Monica
Dwight C. Lefferts Home	1910	1210 W. Highland Ave.	Redlands
R.D. Farquhar Residence	1911	147 Georgina Avenue	Santa Monica
Charles Eaton House	1913	1161 Virginia Road	San Marino
Festival Hall (1915 Panama-Pacific Exposition)	1915		San Francisco
William Andrews Clark Mausoleum	1916	5950 Santa Monica Boulevard	Hollywood
Thomas C. Marlowe Residence	1921	1241 Oak Knoll Avenue	Pasadena
William Andrews Clark Memorial Library	1922	2520 Cimarron Street	Los Angeles
Canfield-Moreno Estate	1923	1923 Micheltorena Street	Silver Lake
Alice McManus Clark Library	1927	1664 N. Virginia Street	Reno
Beverly Hills High School	1928	241 Moreno Drive	Beverly Hills
California Club	1930	538 South Flower Street	Los Angeles
Owlwood Estate	1936	South Carolwood Drive	Los Angeles
Harold McCormick House	1939		Beverly Hills
William Garland House	1940		Pebble Beach

== Family life ==
Farquhar married Marion Jones (daughter of John Percival Jones) in New York City, in 1903. They had three children: David Farquhar (1904 - ), John Percival Farquhar (1912 - ) and Colin Farquhar (1913 - ). The family lived first in Santa Monica, then moved to Pasadena in 1929. Farquhar retired in 1953 and lived with his half brother Francis P. Farquhar in Berkeley.
