= Misery Islands =

Nature reserve in Salem Sound, Massachusetts

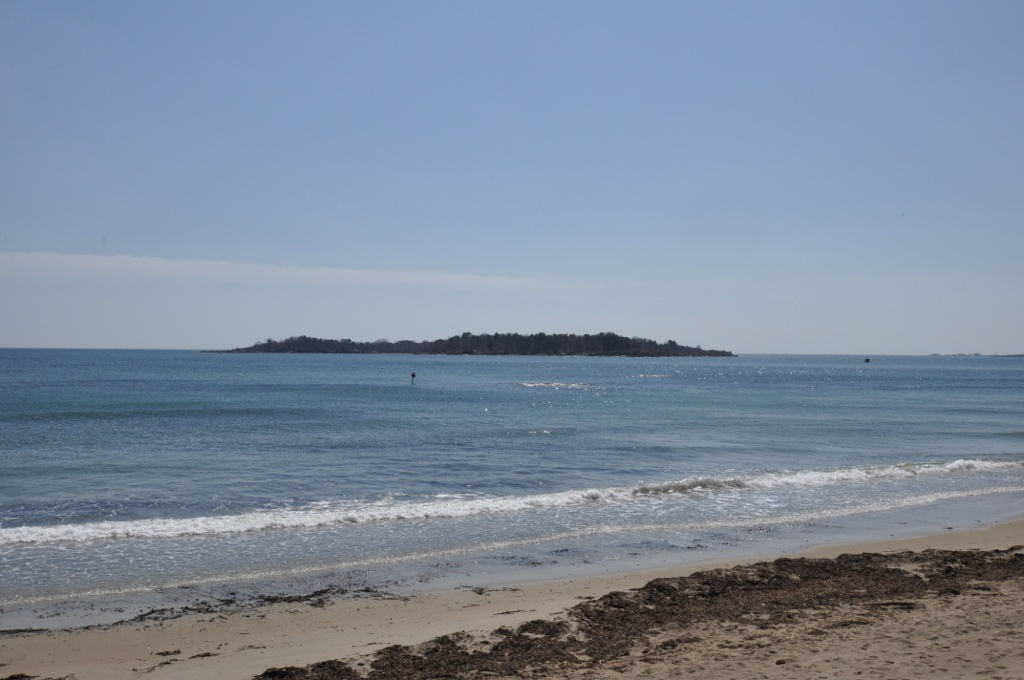
Great Misery Island, as seen from Beverly Farms, Massachusetts

The Misery Islands (Great Misery Island 42°32′55″N 70°47′53″W and Little Misery Island 42°32′40″N 70°47′53″W) are an 87-acre (350,000 m^{2}) nature reserve established in 1935 in Salem Sound close to the Salem Harbor in Salem, Massachusetts. It is managed by the Trustees of Reservations. The islands are a part of the city of Salem, although they are much closer to the mainland of the city of Beverly, in whose aquatic territory they lie.

== History ==
The islands' name come from shipbuilder Robert Moulton who was stranded on the islands during a winter storm in the 1620s. Great Misery Island, in the past, has had numerous structures on it. In the early 1900s, there was a private club that catered to socialites from Boston and surrounding areas. There was a casino, saltwater swimming area, 9-hole golf course (all par 3s) and lounge. After several years of business, the club went bankrupt and was abandoned. The land was sold off to private owners, many of whom built cottages on the land. Many records show that upwards of 25 cottages were on the island at one time. From 1916 to 1917, the Massachusetts State Militia Aviation Camp was an encampment of the Massachusetts Naval Air Militia on the island.

In the late 1920s a fire burned the majority of the structures down. The fire was blamed on a brush fire, but many of the residents believed it may have been set by visitors from land, since the fire happened during the off-season when owners were not there and cottages had been closed for the season. During the 1940s, a seaplane hangar was built on the west side of the island and was used for private charters. The hangar has since been removed but parts of the foundation can still be found along the beach.

In 1935, a private nonprofit group, the North Shore Association, was formed to protect the land from development. The association purchased most of the island, and turned it over to The Trustees of Reservation for preservation. The Trustees acquired the remainder of the island by gift and purchase between 1938 and 1997. The island is now uninhabited and is open to the public for recreation.
