= Owlwood Estate =

Historic estate in Los Angeles, California

- Interactive map of the Owlwood Estate area

General information
- Location: 141 South Carolwood, Holmby Hills, Los Angeles, California, U.S.
- Coordinates: 34.079461°N 118.426337°W
- Completed: 1937
- Client: Florence Letts Quinn

Design and construction
- Architect: Robert D. Farquhar

Owlwood Estate is a historic mansion in Holmby Hills, Los Angeles, California, United States. Built in 1937 and designed by architect Robert D. Farquhar, the 12,600-square-foot (1,170 m^{2}) Tuscan-style estate was the largest house in Los Angeles when completed. It is located at 141 South Carolwood Drive just south of Sunset Boulvard. on a 3.7-acre lot at the end of a cul-de-sac bordering the Los Angeles Country Club.

The estate has had numerous notable owners throughout its history, including businessman Charles H. Quinn and his wife Florence Letts Quinn, film executive Joseph M. Schenck, actors Tony Curtis and Cher, and businessman Roland Arnall. In September 2016, the property sold for $90 million to an investment firm, setting the record as the third highest residential sale in Los Angeles history at that time. The estate returned to the market in 2017 listed at $180 million.

== Description ==
The 12,600-square-foot (1,170 m^{2}) Tuscan-style mansion was designed by architect Robert D. Farquhar in 1937, and was the largest house in Los Angeles when it was built. It has two stories, six bedrooms and two staff bedrooms, seven full bathrooms and five half-bathrooms, a tennis court, a pool house, a swimming pool, a theatre, and a full-size elevator.

== History ==
=== Construction and first owners ===
The first owners were businessman Charles H. Quinn (1876–1975) and his wife, Florence Letts Quinn (1868–1944), the widow of Arthur Letts (1862–1923), the original developer of Holmby Hills. Arthur Letts chose 141 South Carolwood Drive from all the development's acreage for his family's estate. However, he died before building commenced, and his widow inherited the property, a 3.7-acre lot at the end of a cul-de-sac bordering the Los Angeles Country Club. It was the only property excluded from the original Holmby Hills offerings. Florence Letts selected prominent architect Robert D. Farquhar to design and build the estate, and was responsible for the European influences seen in the selections and finishes.

=== Subsequent owners ===
The second owner, Texas entrepreneur Joseph Drown, founder of the Hotel Bel Air, only lived at 141 South Carolwood for two years and made no major changes to the estate. The third owner was Joe Schenck (1878–1961), the first president of United Artists and chairman of 20th Century Fox. During his ownership, Marilyn Monroe, a close friend, was a regular visitor. He sold the estate in 1956 to William Keck of Superior Oil.

In the 1960s, Tony Curtis (1925–2010) purchased the estate from Mr. Keck. In 1967, Sonny Bono (1935–1998) and Cher attended a birthday party at the estate; Cher fell in love with the estate but Curtis refused to sell his beloved Carolwood. But when he began filming in London a few years later, he called Cher. She and Sonny purchased the estate and she began an extensive design project. When it was completed, Architectural Digest featured 141 South Carolwood Drive in the May/June 1974 issue.

In 1976, Cher sold the estate to Chase and Ralph Mishkin, who renamed it "Owlwood", in honor of the owls that lived in the towering trees on the property. After only two years, they sold Owlwood to the eighth owner, Ghazi Alta, an investor from Monaco. Alta then acquired the neighboring 4.6-acre estate at 10060 Sunset Boulevard, which had been owned by Bill Osco, the producer of Flash Gordon, and prior to that the Olympic swimmer and actress Esther Williams. Alta sold Owlwood and the 10060 Sunset estate to Dawn and Roland Arnall in 2002. The Arnalls subsequently purchased and demolished the adjacent Pink Palace estate at 10010 Sunset Boulevard. The Pink Palace estate along with South Carolwood Drive was added to the Owlwood property.

In 2016, Owlwood, known as "The Crown Jewel of Holmby Hills", was quietly shown to vetted buyers as a private off-market listing at a sales price of $150 million. Owlwood was never listed for sale in the MLS, publicized or advertised.

=== Ownership by investment firms ===
In September 2016, the Owlwood estate sold for US$90 million to Sturmer Pippin Investments, LLC. Bob Shapiro, head of Sturmer Pippin Investments and Woodbridge Luxury Homes, said he intended to honor the property's legendary past. In 2016, the Owlwood purchase set the record as the third highest residential sale in Los Angeles history and represented the 2016 highest off-market private sale in Los Angeles.

In July 2017, the Owlwood Estate returned to the Los Angeles real estate market, listed for sale at $180 million.

In December 2017, the Securities and Exchange Commission filed suit against the Woodbridge Group of companies, which had bought Owlwood, and Bob Shapiro, alleging that Woodbridge and its associated companies operated as a Ponzi scheme.

In late 2020, as part of Woodbridge's ongoing bankruptcy proceedings, the property was sold in an off-market deal to an undisclosed buyer for $88 million.

== In popular culture ==
The Owlwood Estate has appeared in both film and television productions:

- The estate was featured in the television series Barnaby Jones, appearing in the 1974 episode "Rendezvous with Terror".
- In the 1983 comedy film My Tutor, the estate is used as the exterior of the "Chrystal" residence. The pool and tennis court areas of 141 South Carolwood Drive are clearly visible during an outdoor dinner scene.

== See also ==
- Gross, Michael (2011). Unreal Estate: Money, Ambition, and the Lust for Land in Los Angeles. New York: Broadway Books. ISBN 978-0-7679-3265-3.
