= Nomans Land =

Uninhabited island in Massachusetts

Native name: Cappoaquit
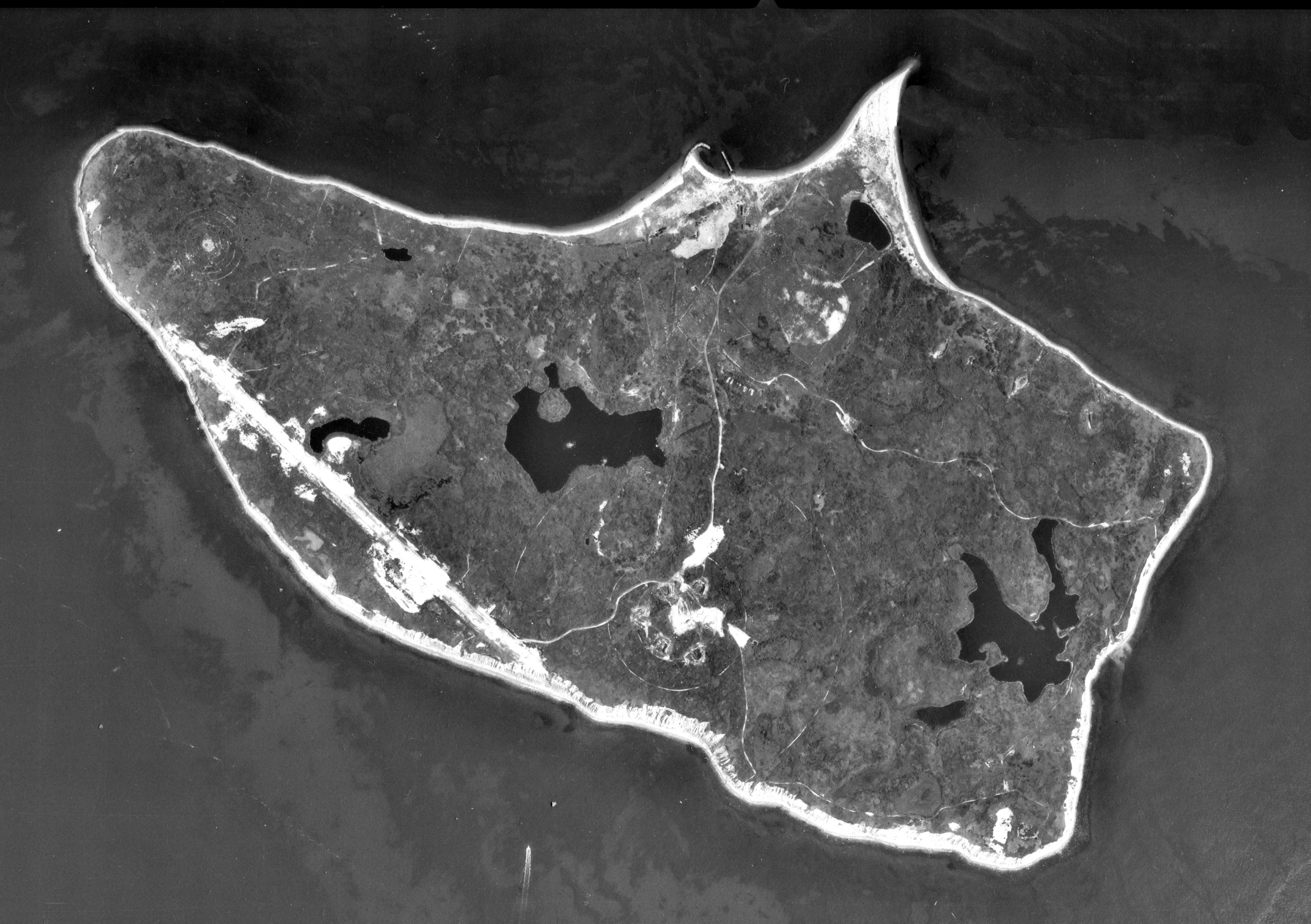
- 1971 Massachusetts Department of Environmental Protection photograph of Nomans Land

- Location of Nomans Land in Massachusetts Location in the United States

Geography
- Location: Dukes County, Massachusetts
- Coordinates: 41°15′20″N 70°48′53″W
- Area: 0.95 sq mi (2.5 km^{2})
- Length: 1.56 mi (2.51 km)
- Coastline: 6.96 km (4.33 mi)
- Highest elevation: 102 ft (31.1 m)
- Highest point: The Summit

Administration
- United States
- State: Massachusetts
- County: Dukes
- Town: Chilmark

Demographics
- Population: 0 (2026)

Additional information
- Official website: Nomans Land Island National Wildlife Refuge
- Nomans Land Island National Wildlife Refuge

Nomans Land (Wampanoag: Cappoaquit; also mapped "No Man's Land," "No Mans Land," or "No Man's island"), is an uninhabited island 612 acres (248 ha) in size, located in the town of Chilmark, Dukes County, Massachusetts. It is situated about 3 miles (4.8 km) off the southwest corner of the island of Martha's Vineyard. The island is 1.6 miles (2.6 km) long east to west, and about 1 mile (1.6 km) north to south

The island was used by the United States Navy as a practice bombing range from 1943 to 1996. The United States Fish and Wildlife Service has managed an "overlay" refuge on the eastern third of the island under a Joint Management Agreement between the Department of the Interior and Department of the Navy since 1975. Following an extensive surface clearance of ordnance in 1997 and 1998, the Navy transferred the island to the United States Fish and Wildlife Service for use as an unstaffed wildlife refuge, which now forms Nomans Land Island National Wildlife Refuge. Due to safety risks from unexploded ordnance and its value as a wildlife habitat, the island is closed to all public use.

The island is surrounded entirely by the Atlantic Ocean. About 30% of the island is wetland, which ranges from emergent marshes to permanently flooded open water. There are four artificial ponds that were impounded many years ago by early settlers, two large freshwater ponds, and a number of smaller ponds. Common wetland plants include Virginia chain fern, cranberry, sphagnum moss, broad-leaved cattail, and common reed.

== History ==
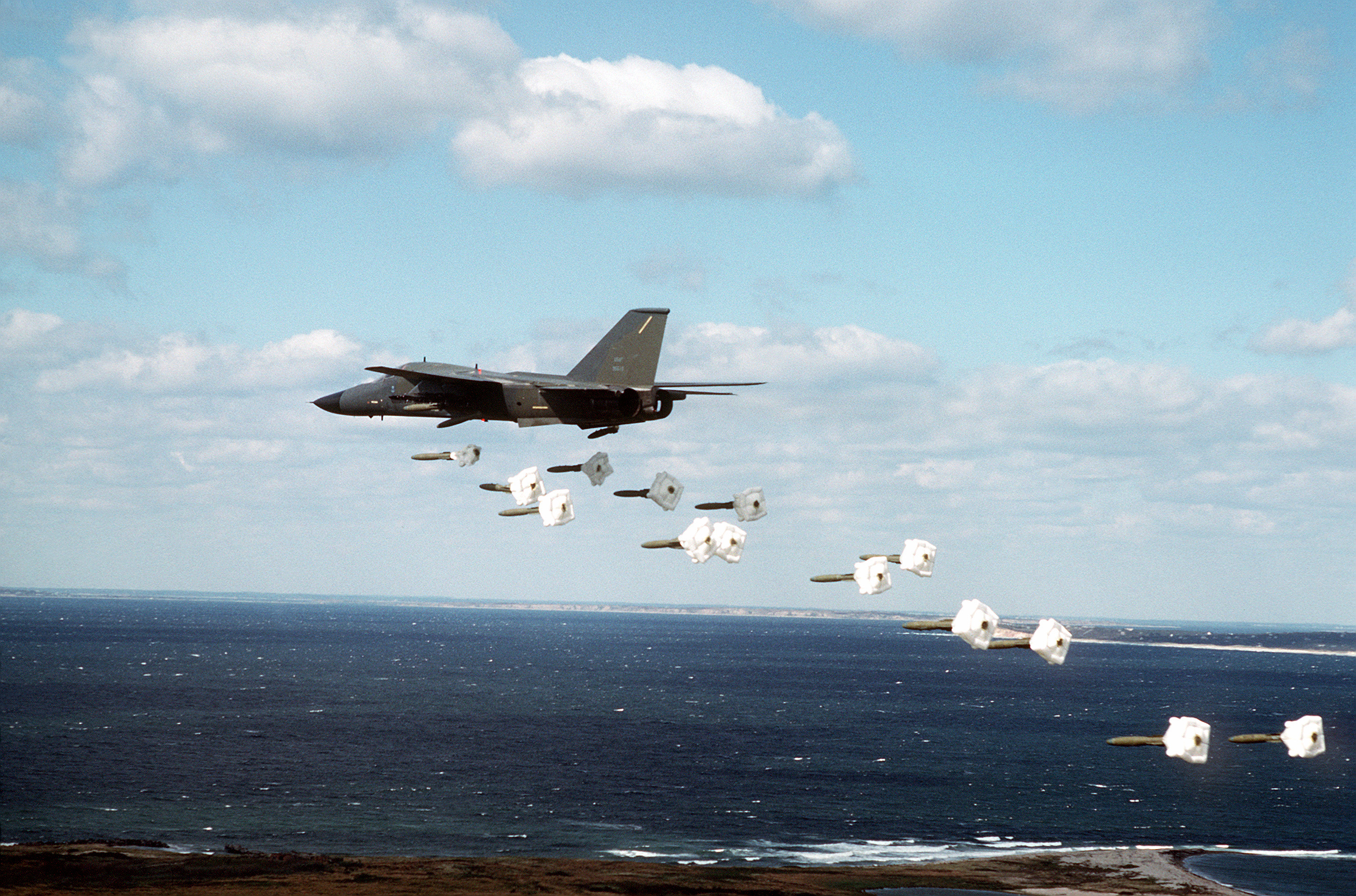
FB-111A from the 509th Bombardment Wing dropping Mark 82 practice bombs during a training mission over the island

In 1602, during the British ship Concord's exploration of Cape Cod, Captain Bartholomew Gosnold named Nomans Land "Martha's Vineyard" after his eldest daughter, Martha. However, the name was later transferred to the larger island currently known as Martha's Vineyard, which is located northeast of Nomans Land.

The island's name, "Nomans Land", may be derived from that of a Martha's Vineyard Wampanoag sachem, Tequenoman, who may have had jurisdiction over the island when the English came in the early 17th century.

An entail of 1695 mentions that William Nicoll of Islip Grange, Long Island, New York, owned the Island of Normans Land near "Martins Vineyard" recalling the fact that on December 19, 1685, Thomas Dongan, Lord of the Manor of Martha's Vineyard (including Normans Land) and Governor of the Province of New York, had made Nicoll his Steward there.

In 1914, Joshua Crane purchased the island for use as a private game preserve. Crane kept pheasants, cattle, and hogs on the island and a caretaker and his family lived on the property year round. During Prohibition, the waters off Nomans Land became a hot spot for rum-running.

During World War II, the Crane family leased the island to the United States Navy. An airfield was constructed by the U.S. Navy on the southern edge of the island between November 1942 and May 1944, and the island was used, beginning in World War II, as Nomans Land Range for 53 years (1943–1996). In 1952, the island was sold by the Cranes to the Navy. The airfield was rarely used, and only by propeller aircraft.. It was abandoned by the Navy sometime between 1945 and 1954, though usage as a bombing range continued until 1996.

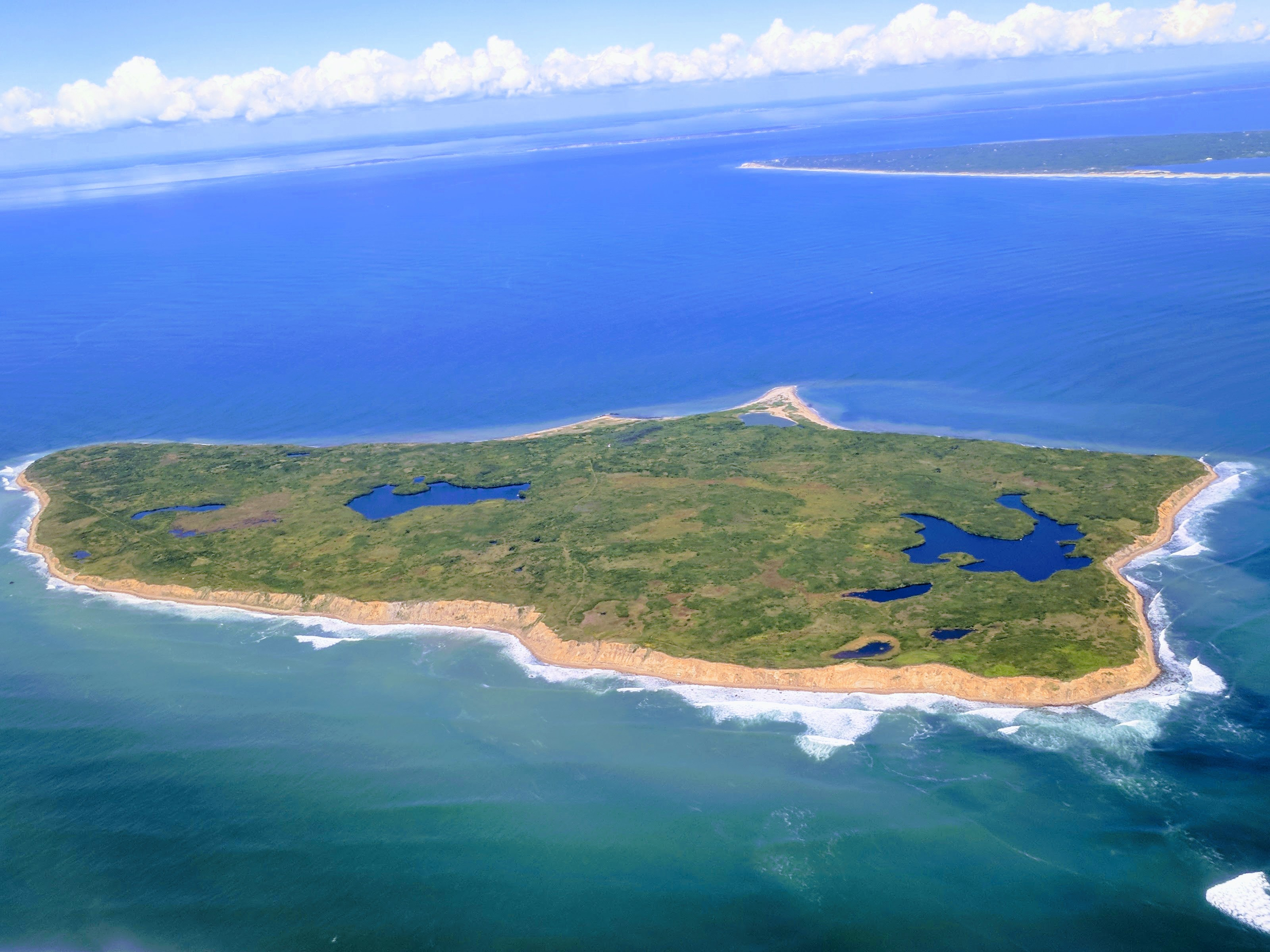
Photograph of the island Nomans Land, Massachusetts during airplane flyover.

The eastern third of the island has been managed by the United States Fish and Wildlife Service since 1975. Following an effort to clear the island of ordnance in 1997 and 1998, the rest of the island was transferred to the Fish and Wildlife Service for use as a wildlife refuge, primarily for migratory birds.

Two restricted airspace areas, R-4105A and R-4105B, overlaid the island due to the site's former use as a range. These restricted areas were revoked in October 2014.

=== Rune stone ===
A stone covered in runes mentioning the Viking explorer Leif Erikson, believed to be the first European to set foot in North America, was reportedly discovered in 1926 and photographed near the coast of the island. If it were authentic, it might suggest that Vikings had traveled as far south as present-day Massachusetts, and that it is the true location of the settlement of Vinland; however, archaeologists have considered it a hoax. Translations of the runes on the stone contained unusual grammar as well as Roman numerals, which has led to skepticism about its credibility. Undetonated bombs on and around the island have prevented further investigations.

== Ecology ==
Nomans Land Island Wildlife Refuge
- IUCN category IV (habitat/species management area)
- Interactive map of Nomans Land Island Wildlife Refuge
- Established: 1998
- Governing body: U.S. Fish and Wildlife Service
- Website: Nomans Land Island National Wildlife Refuge

Since being established as a national wildlife refuge and having human activity grind to a halt, Nomans Land has served as an important habitat for many different species. Situated in the middle of the Atlantic Flyway, the island is an important stopover point for migratory birds such as terns and cormorants, who share the shoreline with a sizeable population of seals. Inland, the habitat consists of the steep cliffs on the shoreline, marshland, cranberry bogs, young forest, coastal shrubbery, and more. In the freshwater lakes and ponds (some created by the early farmers on the island) is one of the largest populations of spotted turtles along with other species such as snapping turtles.

In May 2019, the USFWS introduced a population of New England cottontails to Nomans Land. They require young and dense shrubbery to survive, and have been present on the island before until being extirpated by habitat destruction from farmers. The island now hosts a healthy habitat of bayberry and sumac, and due to having no large mammilian predators such as foxes, the rabbits are estimated to be able to grow their population to approximately 600 rabbits.

Formal comprehensive surveys of wildlife that use Nomans Land Island NWR have only been conducted for a few years, but a variety of birds, amphibians, reptiles, and invertebrates have been documented on the island, including many state-listed species.

The island especially provides important habitat to many guilds of birds including seabirds, shorebirds, marshbirds, waterfowl, songbirds, and raptors. During the summer, large numbers of double-crested cormorants, Virginia rails, and various songbirds (Savannah sparrows and common yellowthroats) rely on the island for nesting habitat. In addition, Leach's storm-petrels have been confirmed nesting on the island since 2002, making the island one of only two sites where this species nests in Massachusetts. During the fall migration, numerous species of raptors (such as peregrine falcons and Cooper's hawks) and neotropical migrants use the island as feeding and resting habitat.

Nomans Land Island Refuge was well forested in the 17th century but was almost completely cleared during the 19th century for farming and sheep raising, and the current vegetation reflects its formerly forested state. Harsh oceanic winds, salt spray, and a lack of shelter have since resulted in a landscape dominated by brush, grasses, and sedges. Dominant upland vegetation includes rose, poison ivy, bayberry, and arrowwood. Openings created by past fires support grasses and forbs, while areas not affected by fire are dominated by bayberry. Sand dune beach plant communities along the northern shore include American beachgrass, switchgrass, beardgrass, seaside goldenrod, and beach pea.

== Sources ==
- Banks, Charles E. (1911). The History of Martha's Vineyard. Vol. II.
- Blocks 3059 and 3060, Block Group 3, Census Tract 2004, Dukes County United States Census Bureau
