= Massachusetts State Militia Aviation Camp =

Coordinates: 42°32′57.84″N 70°48′9.64″W

Massachusetts State Militia Aviation Camp was an encampment of the Massachusetts Naval Air Militia that existed on Great Misery Island in Salem, Massachusetts from 1916 to 1917.

== See also ==
- List of military installations in Massachusetts
