= Platinum Triangle, Los Angeles =

Group of neighborhoods in California, US

Coordinates: 34.0848°N 118.4271°W

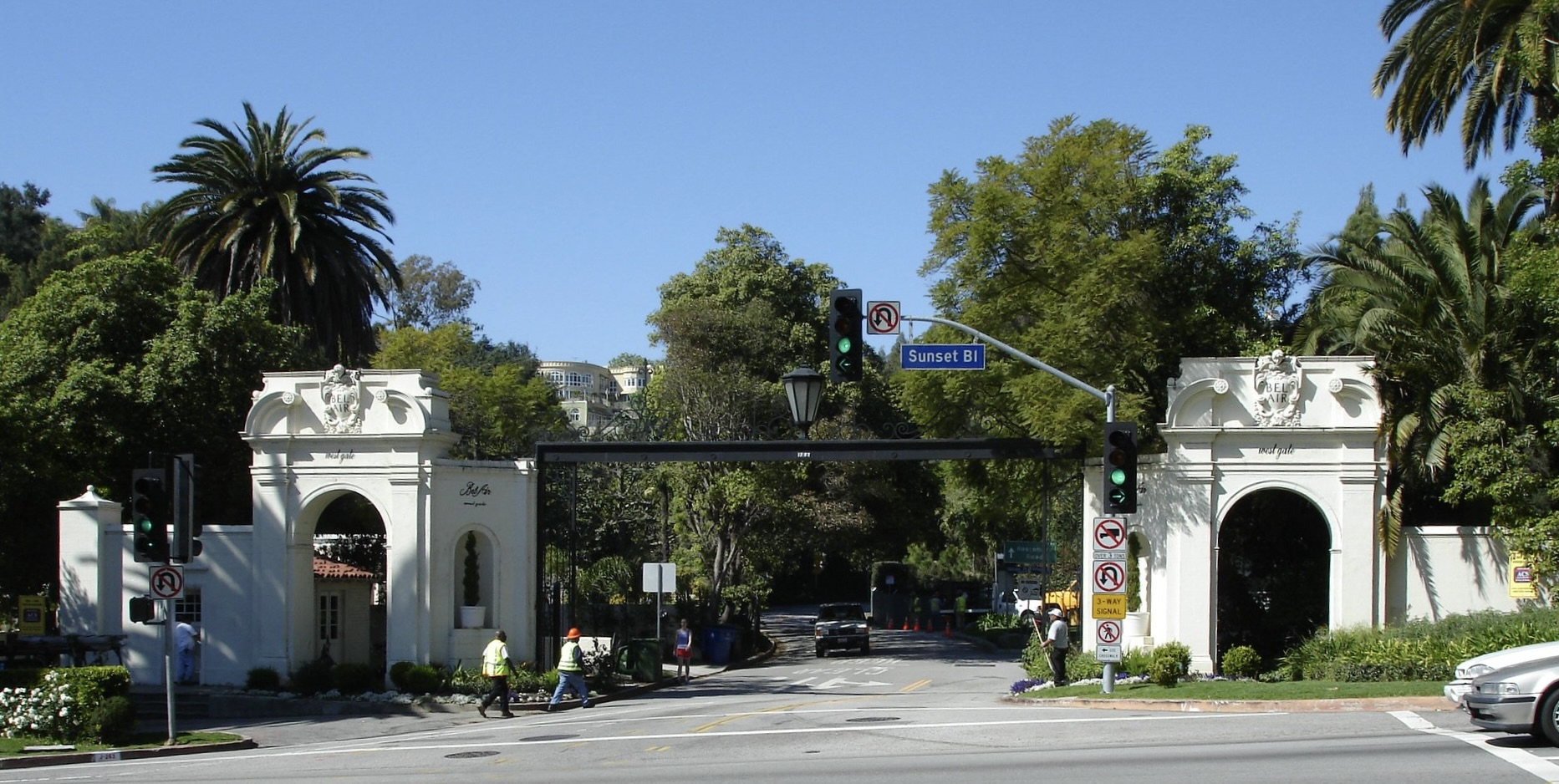
West entrance of Bel Air at Bellagio and Sunset Blvd. Credits to Mike Downey

The Platinum Triangle is an informal name for three adjacent neighborhoods in the Los Angeles Westside area. It includes Beverly Hills, which is its own city within Los Angeles County, along with two Los Angeles city neighborhoods, Bel Air and Holmby Hills. The "Platinum Triangle" designation refers to the affluence of the three neighborhoods and their multi-million dollar homes. The area is consistently ranked as one of the most expensive housing markets in the country.

== In popular culture ==
A 2011 book called Unreal Estate: Money, Ambition and the Lust for Land in Los Angeles, by Michael Gross, describes the social history of the Platinum Triangle.
