= List of United States Coast Guard vice admirals =

Flag of a Coast Guard vice admiral

The grade of vice admiral (or three-star admiral) is the second-highest in the United States Coast Guard, ranking above rear admiral (two-star admiral) and below admiral (four-star admiral).

The grade of vice admiral was first granted to the commandant of the Coast Guard during World War II. From 1942 to 1972, the Coast Guard had at most one vice admiral, either the commandant or the assistant commandant. Additional vice admirals were appointed in 1972 to command operating forces in the Atlantic and Pacific, and by 2021 the Coast Guard had four vice admirals on active duty. More than a dozen rear admirals received tombstone promotions to vice admiral when they retired, for either completing 40 years of service or being specially commended for performance of duty in actual combat before the end of World War II. Tombstone promotions for years of service ended on November 1, 1949, and for combat citations on November 1, 1959.

Of the 82 vice admirals who were appointed to that rank while on active duty, 70 were commissioned via the U.S. Coast Guard Academy (USCGA) or its predecessor, the U.S. Revenue Cutter Service School of Instruction (USRCSSI); 1 via the U.S. Merchant Marine Academy (USMMA); and 11 via officer candidate school (OCS).

== List of vice admirals ==
The following list of vice admirals is indexed by the numerical order in which each officer was appointed to that rank. Each entry lists the officer's name, date of rank, number of years on active duty as vice admiral (Yrs), active-duty positions held while serving as vice admiral, year commissioned and source of commission, and number of years in commission when promoted to vice admiral (YC), and other biographical notes.

#	Name	Photo	Date of rank	Position	Yrs	Commission	YC	Notes
1	Russell R. Waesche		10 Mar 1942	Commandant of the Coast Guard, 1936–1946.	3	1906 (USRCSSI)	36	(1886–1946) Commandant of the Coast Guard, with rank of admiral, 4 Apr 1945–1 Jan 1946.
2	Merlin O'Neill		1 Jan 1950	Commandant of the Coast Guard, 1950–1954.	4	1921 (USCGA)	29	(1898–1981) Retired as admiral, 1 Jan 1954.
3	Alfred C. Richmond		1 Jun 1954	Commandant of the Coast Guard, 1954–1962.	6	1924 (USCGA)	30	(1902–1984) Commandant of the Coast Guard, with rank of admiral, 1 Jun 1960–1 Jun 1962.
4	James A. Hirshfield		1 Jun 1960	Assistant Commandant/Chief of Staff of the Coast Guard, 1954–1962.	2	1924 (USCGA)	36	(1902–1993)
5	Edwin J. Roland		12 Feb 1962	Assistant Commandant/Chief of Staff of the Coast Guard, 1962.	0	1929 (USCGA)	33	(1905–1985) Commandant of the Coast Guard, with rank of admiral, 1 Jun 1962–1 Jun 1966.
6	Donald M. Morrison		3 Jul 1962	Assistant Commandant of the Coast Guard, 1962–1964.	2	1931 (USCGA)	31	(1906–1989)
7	William D. Shields		8 Jul 1964	Assistant Commandant of the Coast Guard, 1964–1966.	2	1931 (USCGA)	33	(1907–1989)
8	Paul E. Trimble		17 Jul 1966	Assistant Commandant of the Coast Guard, 1966–1970.	4	1936 (USCGA)	30	(1913–2004)
9	Thomas R. Sargent III		1 Jul 1970	Assistant Commandant of the Coast Guard, 1970–1972.; Vice Commandant of the Coast Guard, 1972–1974.	4	1938 (USCGA)	32	(1914–2010)
10	Mark A. Whalen		14 Oct 1972	Commander, Coast Guard Pacific Area/Twelfth Coast Guard District, 1972–1974.	2	1937 (USCGA)	35	(1919–2002)
11	Benjamin F. Engel		14 Oct 1972	Commander, Coast Guard Atlantic Area/Third Coast Guard District, 1972–1974.	2	1938 (USCGA)	34	(1914–1983)
12	Ellis L. Perry		1 Jul 1974	Vice Commandant of the Coast Guard, 1974–1978.	4	1941 (USCGA)	33	(1919–2002)
13	William F. Rea III		1 Jul 1974	Commander, Coast Guard Atlantic Area/Third Coast Guard District, 1974–1978.	4	1941 (USCGA)	33	(1918–2004)
14	Joseph J. McClelland		1 Jul 1974	Commander, Coast Guard Pacific Area/Twelfth Coast Guard District, 1974–1976.	2	1940 (USCGA)	34	(1916–1981)
15	Austin C. Wagner		30 Jun 1976	Commander, Coast Guard Pacific Area/Twelfth Coast Guard District, 1976–1978.	2	1941 (USCGA)	35	(1919–2004)
16	Robert H. Scarborough Jr.		1 Jul 1978	Vice Commandant of the Coast Guard, 1978–1982.	4	1944 (USMMA)	34	(1923–2020)
17	Robert I. Price		1 Jul 1978	Commander, Coast Guard Atlantic Area/Third Coast Guard District, 1978–1971.	3	1945 (USCGA)	33	(1921–2019)
18	James S. Gracey		1 Jul 1978	Commander, Coast Guard Pacific Area/Twelfth Coast Guard District, 1978–1981.; Commander, Coast Guard Atlantic Area/Third Coast Guard District, 1981–1982.	4	1949 (USCGA)	29	(1927–2020) Commandant of the Coast Guard, with rank of admiral, 28 May 1982 – 30 May 1986.
19	James P. Stewart		17 Jun 1981	Commander, Coast Guard Pacific Area/Twelfth Coast Guard District, 1981–1982.	1	1946 (USCGA)	35	(1924–2019)
20	Wayne E. Caldwell		21 May 1982	Commander, Coast Guard Atlantic Area/Third Coast Guard District, 1982–1984.	2	1948 (USCGA)	34	(1923–2009)
21	Benedict L. Stabile		22 May 1982	Vice Commandant of the Coast Guard, 1982–1986.	4	1950 (USCGA)	32	(1927–2014)
22	Charles E. Larkin		28 Jun 1982	Commander, Coast Guard Atlantic Area/Third Coast Guard District, 1982–1984.	2	1949 (USCGA)	33	(1927– )
23	Paul A. Yost Jr.		1 Jul 1984	Commander, Coast Guard Atlantic Area/Third Coast Guard District/U.S. Maritime Defense Zone, Atlantic, 1984–1986.	2	1951 (USCGA)	33	(1929– ) Commandant of the Coast Guard, with rank of admiral, 30 May 1986 – 31 May 1990.
24	John D. Costello		31 Jul 1984	Commander, Coast Guard Pacific Area/Twelfth Coast Guard District, 1984.; Commander, Coast Guard Pacific Area/U.S. Maritime Defense Zone, Pacific/Twelfth Coast Guard District, 1984–1987.; Commander, Coast Guard Pacific Area/U.S. Maritime Defense Zone, Pacific, 1987–1988.	4	1952 (USCGA)	32	(1930–2014)
25	James C. Irwin		16 May 1986	Vice Commandant of the Coast Guard, 1986–1988.; Commander, Coast Guard Atlantic Area/U.S. Maritime Defense Zone, Atlantic, 1988–1989.; Commander, Department of Defense Joint Task Force Four, 1989–1991.	5	1953 (USCGA)	33	(1929–2018)
26	Donald C. Thompson		27 May 1986	Commander, Coast Guard Atlantic Area/U.S. Maritime Defense Zone, Atlantic/Third Coast Guard District, 1986–1987.; Commander, Coast Guard Atlantic Area/U.S. Maritime Defense Zone, Atlantic, 1987–1988.	2	1952 (USCGA)	34	(1930–2022)
27	Clyde T. Lusk Jr.		Jun 1988	Vice Commandant of the Coast Guard, 1988–1990.	2	1954 (USCGA)	34	(1932–2014)
28	Clyde E. Robbins		Jun 1988	Commander, Coast Guard Pacific Area/U.S. Maritime Defense Zone, Pacific, 1988–1990.; Director, Intelligence and Security, U.S. Department of Transportation, 1990–1993.	5	1954 (USCGA)	34	(1929– )
29	Howard B. Thorsen		31 Mar 1989	Commander, Coast Guard Atlantic Area/U.S. Maritime Defense Zone, Atlantic, 1989–1991.	2	1955 (USCGA)	34	(1933– )
30	Martin H. Daniell Jr.		May 1990	Vice Commandant of the Coast Guard, 1990–1992.; Commander, Coast Guard Pacific Area/U.S. Maritime Defense Zone, Pacific, 1992–1994.; Commander, Coast Guard Pacific Area/U.S. Maritime Defense Zone, Pacific/Joint Interagency Task Force West, 1994.	4	1957 (OCS)	35	(1935– )
31	A. Bruce Beran		30 Jun 1990	Commander, Coast Guard Pacific Area/U.S. Maritime Defense Zone, Pacific, 1990–1992.	2	1957 (USCGA)	33	(1935– )
32	Paul A. Welling		28 Jun 1991	Commander, Coast Guard Atlantic Area/U.S. Maritime Defense Zone, Atlantic, 1991–1994.	3	1959 (USCGA)	32	(1938– )
33	Robert T. Nelson		Jun 1992	Vice Commandant of the Coast Guard, 1992–1994.	2	1958 (USCGA)	34	(1936– )
34	Robert E. Kramek		Jul 1992	Chief of Staff, U.S. Coast Guard, 1992–1994.	2	1961 (USCGA)	31	(1939–2016) Commandant of the Coast Guard, with rank of admiral, 1 Jun 1994–30 May 1998.
35	Arthur D. Henn		Jun 1994	Vice Commandant of the Coast Guard, 1994–1996.	2	1962 (USCGA)	32	(1940–2001)
36	James M. Loy		23 Jun 1994	Commander, Coast Guard Atlantic Area/U.S. Maritime Defense Zone, Atlantic, 1994–1996.; Chief of Staff, U.S. Coast Guard, 1996–1998.	4	1964 (USCGA)	30	(1942– ) Commandant of the Coast Guard, with rank of admiral, 30 May 1998 – 30 May 2002. Administrator, Transportation Security Administration, 2002–2003; U.S. Deputy Secretary of Homeland Security, 2003–2005.
37	Kent H. Williams		Jun 1994	Chief of Staff, U.S. Coast Guard, 1994–1996.; Commander, Coast Guard Atlantic Area/U.S. Maritime Defense Zone, Atlantic, 1996.; Commander, Coast Guard Atlantic Area/U.S. Maritime Defense Zone, Atlantic/Fifth Coast Guard District, 1996–1997.	3	1965 (USCGA)	31	(1943– )
38	Richard D. Herr		1 Jul 1994	Commander, Coast Guard Pacific Area/U.S. Maritime Defense Zone, Pacific/Joint Interagency Task Force West, 1994.; Commander, Coast Guard Pacific Area/U.S. Maritime Defense Zone, Pacific, 1994–1996.; Vice Commandant of the Coast Guard, 1996–1998.	4	1964 (USCGA)	30	(1941– )
39	Roger T. Rufe Jr.		1996	Commander, Coast Guard Pacific Area/U.S. Maritime Defense Zone, Pacific, 1996.; Commander, Coast Guard Pacific Area/U.S. Maritime Defense Zone, Pacific/Eleventh Coast Guard District, 1996–1997.; Commander, Coast Guard Atlantic Area/U.S. Maritime Defense Zone, Atlantic/Fifth Coast Guard District, 1997–1999.	3	1965 (USCGA)	31	(1943– )
40	James C. Card		May 1997	Commander, Coast Guard Pacific Area/U.S. Maritime Defense Zone, Pacific/Eleventh Coast Guard District, 1997–1998.; Vice Commandant of the Coast Guard, 1998–2000.	3	1964 (USCGA)	33	(1942– )
41	Timothy W. Josiah		May 1998	Chief of Staff, U.S. Coast Guard, 1998–2002.	4	1969 (USCGA)	29	(c. 1947– )
42	Thomas H. Collins		1998	Commander, Coast Guard Pacific Area/U.S. Maritime Defense Zone, Pacific/Eleventh Coast Guard District, 1998–2000.; Vice Commandant of the Coast Guard, 2000–2002.	4	1968 (USCGA)	30	(1946– ) Commandant of the Coast Guard, with rank of admiral, 30 May 2002 – 25 May 2006.
43	John E. Shkor		3 Sep 1999	Commander, Coast Guard Atlantic Area/U.S. Maritime Defense Zone, Atlantic/Fifth Coast Guard District, 1999–2001.	2	1966 (USCGA)	33	(1944– )
44	Ernest R. Riutta		24 May 2000	Commander, Coast Guard Pacific Area/U.S. Maritime Defense Zone, Pacific/Eleventh Coast Guard District, 2000–2002.	2	1968 (USCGA)	32	(c. 1946– )
45	Thad W. Allen		Aug 2001	Commander, Coast Guard Atlantic Area/U.S. Maritime Defense Zone, Atlantic/Fifth Coast Guard District, 2001–2002.; Chief of Staff, U.S. Coast Guard, 2002–2006.	5	1971 (USCGA)	30	(1949– ) Commandant of the Coast Guard, with rank of admiral, 25 May 2006 – 25 May 2010.
46	James D. Hull		14 May 2002	Commander, Coast Guard Atlantic Area/U.S. Maritime Defense Zone, Atlantic/Fifth Coast Guard District, 2002–2003.; Commander, Coast Guard Atlantic Area/U.S. Maritime Defense Zone, Atlantic, 2003–2004.	2	1969 (USCGA)	33	(c. 1947– )
47	Thomas J. Barrett		30 May 2002	Vice Commandant of the Coast Guard, 2002–2004.	2	1969 (OCS)	33	(1947– ) Administrator, Pipeline and Hazardous Materials Safety Administration, 2006–2007; U.S. Deputy Secretary of Transportation, 2007–2009.
48	Terry M. Cross		Jul 2002	Commander, Coast Guard Pacific Area/U.S. Maritime Defense Zone, Pacific/Eleventh Coast Guard District, 2002–2003.; Commander, Coast Guard Pacific Area/U.S. Maritime Defense Zone, Pacific, 2003–2004.; Vice Commandant of the Coast Guard, 2004–2006.	4	1970 (USCGA)	32	(1947– )
49	Harvey E. Johnson Jr.		Jun 2004	Commander, Coast Guard Pacific Area/U.S. Maritime Defense Zone, Pacific, 2004.; Commander, Coast Guard Pacific Area/Coast Guard Defense Force West, 2004–2006.	2	1975 (USCGA)	29	(c. 1953– ) Deputy Administrator, Federal Emergency Management Agency, 2006–2009.
50	Vivien S. Crea		16 Jul 2004	Commander, Coast Guard Atlantic Area/U.S. Maritime Defense Zone, Atlantic, 2004.; Commander, Coast Guard Atlantic Area/Coast Guard Defense Force East, 2004–2006.; Vice Commandant of the Coast Guard, 2006–2009.	5	1973 (OCS)	31	(1952– )
51	Robert J. Papp Jr.		Apr 2006	Chief of Staff, U.S. Coast Guard, 2006–2008.; Commander, Coast Guard Atlantic Area/Coast Guard Defense Force East, 2008–2010.	4	1975 (USCGA)	31	(1953– ) Commandant of the Coast Guard, with rank of admiral, 25 May 2010 – 30 May 2014.
52	D. Brian Peterman		9 May 2006	Commander, Coast Guard Atlantic Area/Coast Guard Defense Force East, 2006–2008.	2	1972 (OCS)	34	(c. 1950– )
53	Charles D. Wurster		May 2006	Commander, Coast Guard Pacific Area/Coast Guard Defense Force West, 2006–2008.	2	1971 (USCGA)	35	(c. 1949– ) Brother of Air Force lieutenant general Donald C. Wurster.
54	David P. Pekoske		29 May 2008	Commander, Coast Guard Pacific Area/Coast Guard Defense Force West, 2008–2009.; Vice Commandant of the Coast Guard, 2009–2010.	2	1977 (USCGA)	31	(1955– ) Administrator, Transportation Security Administration, 2017–2025.
55	Clifford I. Pearson		Jun 2008	Chief of Staff, U.S. Coast Guard, 2008–2009.	1	1973 (OCS)	35	(c. 1951– )
56	Jody A. Breckenridge		Jul 2009	Commander, Coast Guard Pacific Area/Coast Guard Defense Force West, 2009–2010.	1	1976 (OCS)	33	(c. 1954– )
57	John P. Currier		6 Aug 2009	Chief of Staff, U.S. Coast Guard, 2009–2011.; Deputy Commandant for Mission Support, U.S. Coast Guard, 2011–2012.; Vice Commandant of the Coast Guard, 2012–2014.	5	1976 (OCS)	33	(1951–2020)
58	Robert C. Parker		30 Apr 2010	Commander, Coast Guard Atlantic Area/Coast Guard Defense Force East, 2010–2014.	4	1979 (USCGA)	33	(1957– )
59	Manson K. Brown		17 May 2010	Commander, Coast Guard Pacific Area/Coast Guard Defense Force West, 2010–2012.; Deputy Commandant for Mission Support, U.S. Coast Guard, 2012–2014.	4	1978 (USCGA)	32	(1956– ) U.S. Assistant Secretary of Commerce for Environmental Observation and Prediction, 2015–2017.
60	Sally Brice-O'Hara		24 May 2010	Vice Commandant of the Coast Guard, 2010–2012.	2	1975 (OCS)	35	(c. 1953– )
61	Brian M. Salerno		28 Mar 2011	Deputy Commandant for Operations, U.S. Coast Guard, 2011–2012.	1	1976 (OCS)	35	(c. 1954– ) Director, Bureau of Safety and Environmental Enforcement, 2013–2017.
62	Paul F. Zukunft		27 Apr 2012	Commander, Coast Guard Pacific Area/Coast Guard Defense Force West, 2012–2014.	2	1977 (USCGA)	35	(1955– ) Commandant of the Coast Guard, with rank of admiral, 30 May 2014–1 Jun 2018.
63	Peter V. Neffenger		3 May 2012	Deputy Commandant for Operations, U.S. Coast Guard, 2012–2014.; Vice Commandant of the Coast Guard, 2014–2015.	3	1982 (OCS)	30	(1955– ) Administrator, Transportation Security Administration, 2015–2017.
64	Charles W. Ray		22 Apr 2014	Commander, Coast Guard Pacific Area/Coast Guard Defense Force West, 2014–2016.; Deputy Commandant for Operations, U.S. Coast Guard, 2016–2018.	4	1981 (USCGA)	33	(1959– ) Vice Commandant of the Coast Guard, with rank of admiral, 24 May 2018–18 Jun 2021.
65	Charles D. Michel		2 May 2014	Deputy Commandant for Operations, U.S. Coast Guard, 2014–2015.; Vice Commandant of the Coast Guard, 2015–2018.	2	1985 (USCGA)	29	(1963– ) Vice Commandant of the Coast Guard, with rank of admiral, 24 May 2016 – 24 May 2018.
66	William D. Lee		16 May 2014	Commander, Coast Guard Atlantic Area/Coast Guard Defense Force East, 2014–2015.; Commander, Coast Guard Atlantic Area/Coast Guard Defense Force East/Director, Department of Homeland Security Joint Task Force–East, 2015–2016.	2	1981 (OCS)	33	(c. 1959– )
67	Sandra L. Stosz		3 Jun 2015	Deputy Commandant for Mission Support, U.S. Coast Guard, 2015–2018.	3	1982 (USCGA)	33	(1960– ) First woman to lead a U.S. service academy.
68	Fred M. Midgette		11 Mar 2016	Deputy Commandant for Operations, U.S. Coast Guard, 2015–2016.; Commander, Coast Guard Pacific Area/Coast Guard Defense Force West, 2016–2018.	3	1982 (USCGA)	33	(c. 1960– )
69	Marshall B. Lytle III		13 Jul 2016	Director, Command, Control, Communications and Computers/Cyber, J-6, Joint Staff, 2016–2018.	2	1981 (USCGA)	35	(1959– )
70	Karl L. Schultz		4 Aug 2016	Commander, Coast Guard Atlantic Area/Coast Guard Defense Force East/Director, Department of Homeland Security Joint Task Force–East, 2016–2018.	2	1983 (USCGA)	33	(1961– ) Commandant of the Coast Guard, with rank of admiral, 1 Jun 2018–1 Jun 2022.
71	Scott A. Buschman		24 May 2018	Commander, Coast Guard Atlantic Area/Coast Guard Defense Force East/Director, Department of Homeland Security Joint Task Force–East, 2018–2020.; Deputy Commandant for Operations, U.S. Coast Guard, 2020–2022.	4	1984 (USCGA)	34	(1962– )
72	Michael F. McAllister		25 May 2018	Deputy Commandant for Mission Support, U.S. Coast Guard, 2018–2021.; Commander, Coast Guard Pacific Area/Coast Guard Defense Force West, 2021–2022.	4	1986 (USCGA)	32	(1964– )
73	Linda L. Fagan		8 Jun 2018	Commander, Coast Guard Pacific Area/Coast Guard Defense Force West, 2018–2021.	3	1985 (USCGA)	33	(1963– ) Vice Commandant of the Coast Guard, with rank of admiral, 18 Jun 2021–1 Jun 2022; Commandant of the Coast Guard, 1 Jun 2022–21 Jan 2025.
74	Daniel B. Abel		18 Jun 2018	Deputy Commandant for Operations, U.S. Coast Guard, 2018–2020.	2	1983 (USCGA)	35	(1961– )
75	Steven D. Poulin		1 Jul 2020	Commander, Coast Guard Atlantic Area/Coast Guard Defense Force East/Director, Department of Homeland Security Joint Task Force–East, 2020–2022.	2	1984 (USCGA)	36	(1962– ) Vice Commandant of the Coast Guard, with rank of admiral, 31 May 2022–13 June 2024.
76	Paul F. Thomas		22 Jun 2021	Deputy Commandant for Mission Support, U.S. Coast Guard, 2021–2024.	3	1985 (USCGA)	36	(1963– )
77	Kevin E. Lunday		24 May 2022	Commander, Coast Guard Atlantic Area/Coast Guard Defense Force East/Director, Department of Homeland Security Joint Task Force–East, 2022–2024.	2	1987 (USCGA)	35	(1965– ) Vice Commandant of the Coast Guard, with rank of admiral, 13 June 2024–present.
78	Peter W. Gautier		24 Jun 2022	Deputy Commandant for Operations, U.S. Coast Guard, 2022–2025.	3	1987 (USCGA)	35	(1965– )
79	Andrew J. Tiongson		8 Jul 2022	Commander, Coast Guard Pacific Area/Coast Guard Defense Force West, 2022–2025.	3	1989 (USCGA)	33	(1967– )
80	Nathan A. Moore		16 May 2024	Commander, Coast Guard Atlantic Area/Coast Guard Defense Force East/Director, Department of Homeland Security Joint Task Force–East, 2024–present.	1	1992 (USCGA)	32	(1970– )
81	Thomas G. Allan Jr.		Jul 2024	Deputy Commandant for Mission Support, U.S. Coast Guard, 2024–2025.	1	1990 (USCGA)	34	(1965– )

== History ==
=== World War II ===
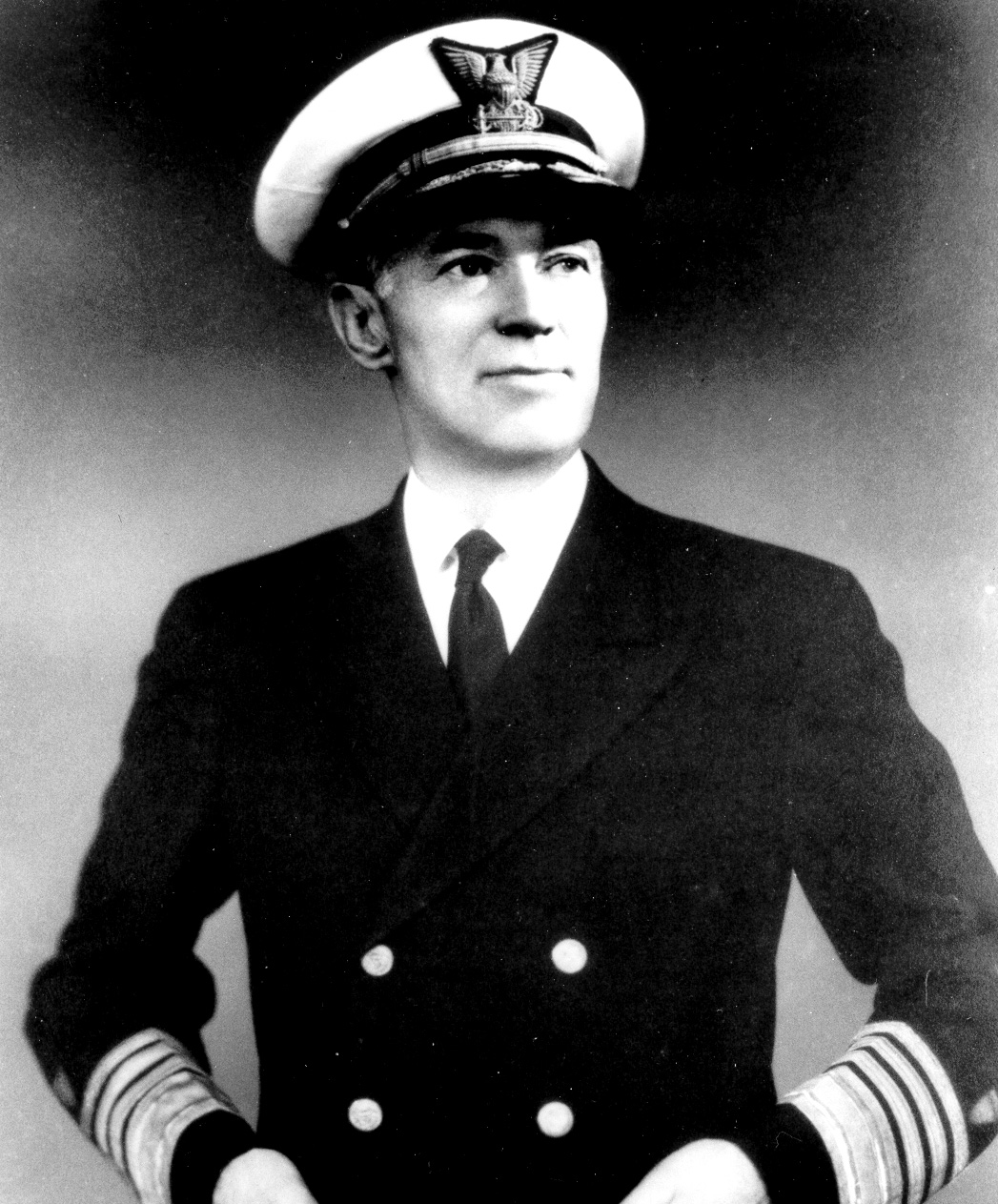
Russell R. Waesche

The first vice admiral in the Coast Guard was appointed in March 1942, following the United States entry into World War II, when Coast Guard commandant Russell R. Waesche and two Navy officers were nominated to be temporary vice admirals under a 1941 statute that authorized an unlimited number of appointments in all grades for temporary service during a national emergency. The statute technically created temporary grades only up to rear admiral, but the Senate confirmed all three officers as vice admirals anyway. Three years later, Waesche became the first four-star officer in the Coast Guard when the commandants of the Coast Guard and Marine Corps were both authorized that rank until six months after the end of the war.

=== Postwar ===
After World War II, Congress consolidated all of the various statutes governing the Coast Guard into a single positive law, Title 14 of the United States Code, which lowered the rank of future commandants to vice admiral. In 1960, Congress restored the commandant's rank to admiral and raised the assistant commandant to vice admiral. Congress gave three-star rank to the commanders of Coast Guard Atlantic Area and Coast Guard Pacific Area in 1972.

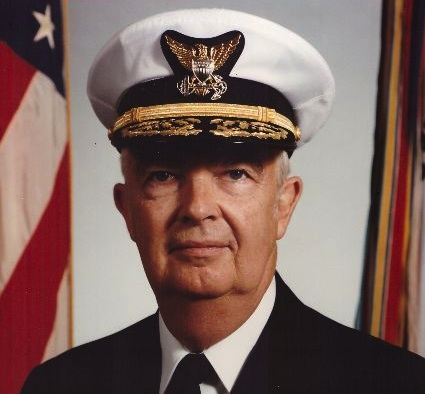
James C. Irwin

Initially most vice admirals retired after their first three-star assignment. Only three of the eight commandants appointed after 1960 ever served as vice admirals, the other five being promoted directly from rear admiral. As late as 1990, rear admiral J. William Kime was selected for commandant over all three vice admirals. Follow-on assignments were rare until 1988, when vice commandant James C. Irwin was transferred to command the Guard Atlantic Area, breaking the tradition that vice commandants retired with their commandants. Irwin retired in 1989 and was recalled to active duty to serve as the three-star commander of Joint Task Force Four, the predecessor of Joint Interagency Task Force South. Reappointments as vice admiral became more common after a fourth three-star position was created for the chief of staff of the Coast Guard in 1993.

=== 21st century ===
In 2010, to support the Coast Guard's modernization plan, Congress removed the requirement that vice admirals be assigned as area commanders or chief of staff of the Coast Guard, and simply authorized the President to designate four positions to carry three-star rank in addition to the vice commandant. The chief of staff of the Coast Guard became the deputy commandant for mission support, and the deputy commandant for operations received a third star.

The Coast Guard Authorization Act of 2015 elevated the vice commandant to admiral and authorized Coast Guard officers to serve as additional vice admirals in positions outside the Coast Guard without having to retire and be recalled to active duty in that rank like Irwin and Clyde E. Robbins, the first director of intelligence and security for the Department of Transportation. In 2016, Marshall B. Lytle III became the director of command, control, communications and computers (C4) and cyber and chief information officer on the Joint Staff, the first Coast Guard officer to compete successfully for a joint three-star position that traditionally rotated between the Army, Navy, Air Force, and Marine Corps.

=== Tombstone vice admirals ===
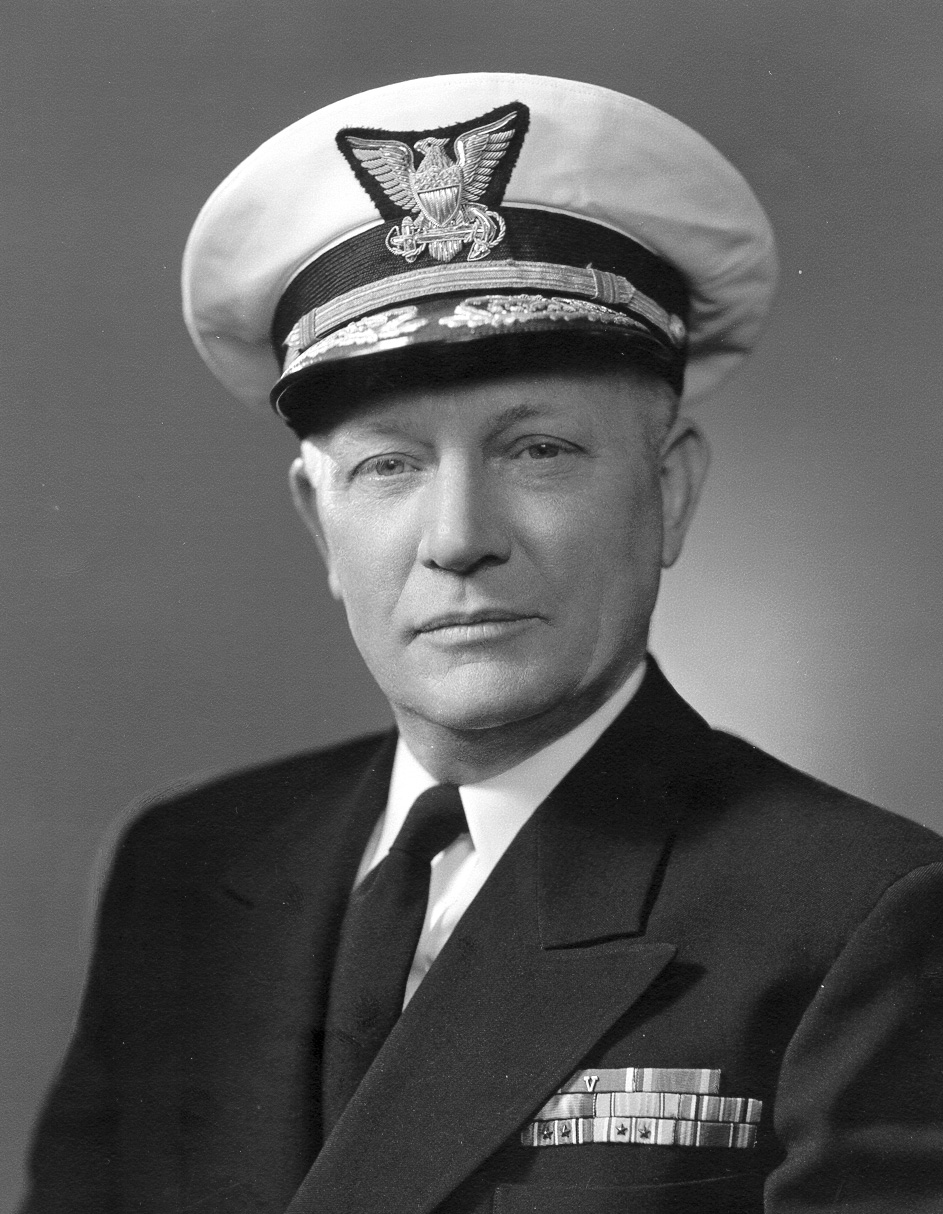
Merlin O'Neill

From 1923 to 1959, Coast Guard officers could retire with a tombstone promotion to the rank and sometimes the pay of the next higher grade, if they had 40 years of service or had been specially commended for the performance of duty in actual combat before the end of World War II. More than a dozen rear admirals received tombstone promotions to vice admiral, and one vice admiral, Merlin O'Neill, received a tombstone promotion to admiral. Tombstone promotions for years of service ended on November 1, 1949, and for combat citations on November 1, 1959.

== Legislative history ==
The following list of Congressional legislation includes all acts of Congress pertaining to appointments to the grade of vice admiral in the United States Coast Guard.

Each entry lists an act of Congress, its citation in the United States Statutes at Large, and a summary of the act's relevance.

Legislation	Citation	Summary
Act of January 12, 1923	42 Stat. 1131	Authorized officers with 40 years of service to retire with the rank and retired pay of the next higher grade.
Act of July 24, 1941	55 Stat. 604	Authorized temporary appointments to higher ranks or grades during a national emergency.
Act of June 6, 1942	56 Stat. 328	Authorized officers who were specially commended for performance of duty in actual combat, to be placed on the retired list with the rank of the next higher grade and three-fourths of the active-duty pay of the grade in which serving at the time of retirement.
Act of March 21, 1945	59 Stat. 37	Authorized one admiral, to be selected from officers serving now or hereafter as Commandant, until six months after the end of World War II.
Act of August 4, 1949	63 Stat. 498; 63 Stat. 516; 63 Stat. 558; 63 Stat. 561	Reduced rank of Commandant to vice admiral.; Reauthorized officers who were specially commended for performance of duty in actual combat, to be placed on the retired list with the rank of the next higher grade and three-fourths of the active-duty pay of the grade in which serving at the time of retirement, unless the duty was performed after December 31, 1946.; Specified no reduction or abolition of the grade any person held on the effective date of this Act.; Repealed authorization for officers with 40 years of service to retire with the rank and retired pay of the next higher grade, effective November 1, 1949.
Act of October 12, 1949 [Career Compensation Act of 1949]	63 Stat. 807	Established pay grade O-8 for admiral, vice admiral, and rear admiral.
Act of August 3, 1950	64 Stat. 406	Repealed authorization for officers who were specially commended for performance of duty in actual combat, to retire with three-fourths of the active-duty pay of the grade in which serving at the time of retirement.
Act of May 20, 1958	72 Stat. 124	Established pay grade O-9 for vice admiral.
Act of August 11, 1959	73 Stat. 338	Repealed authorization for officers who were specially commended for performance of duty in actual combat, to retire with the rank of the next higher grade, effective November 1, 1959.
Act of May 14, 1960	74 Stat. 144	Increased rank of Commandant to admiral, and of Assistant Commandant to vice admiral, effective June 1, 1960.
Act of October 2, 1972	86 Stat. 755	Retitled Assistant Commandant as Vice Commandant.; Authorized grade of vice admiral for Commander, Atlantic Area, and Commander, Pacific Area.
Act of December 20, 1993 [Coast Guard Authorization Act of 1993]	107 Stat. 2422	Authorized grade of vice admiral for Chief of Staff of the Coast Guard, to rank after the Area Commanders.
Act of October 15, 2010 [Coast Guard Authorization Act of 2010]	124 Stat. 2951	Authorized up to four vice admirals in addition to the Vice Commandant, who need not be assigned as Area Commanders or Chief of Staff of the Coast Guard.
Act of February 8, 2016 [Coast Guard Authorization Act of 2015]	130 Stat. 33	Increased rank of Vice Commandant to admiral.; Authorized up to five vice admirals to serve in positions inside the Coast Guard, the fifth of which, if appointed, to be the Chief of Staff of the Coast Guard.; Authorized additional vice admirals to serve in positions outside the Coast Guard or National Oceanic and Atmospheric Administration.

== See also ==
- Vice admiral (United States)
- List of United States Navy vice admirals on active duty before 1960
- List of United States Coast Guard tombstone vice admirals
- List of United States Coast Guard four-star admirals
