= Peter Gautier =

U.S. Coast Guard admiral

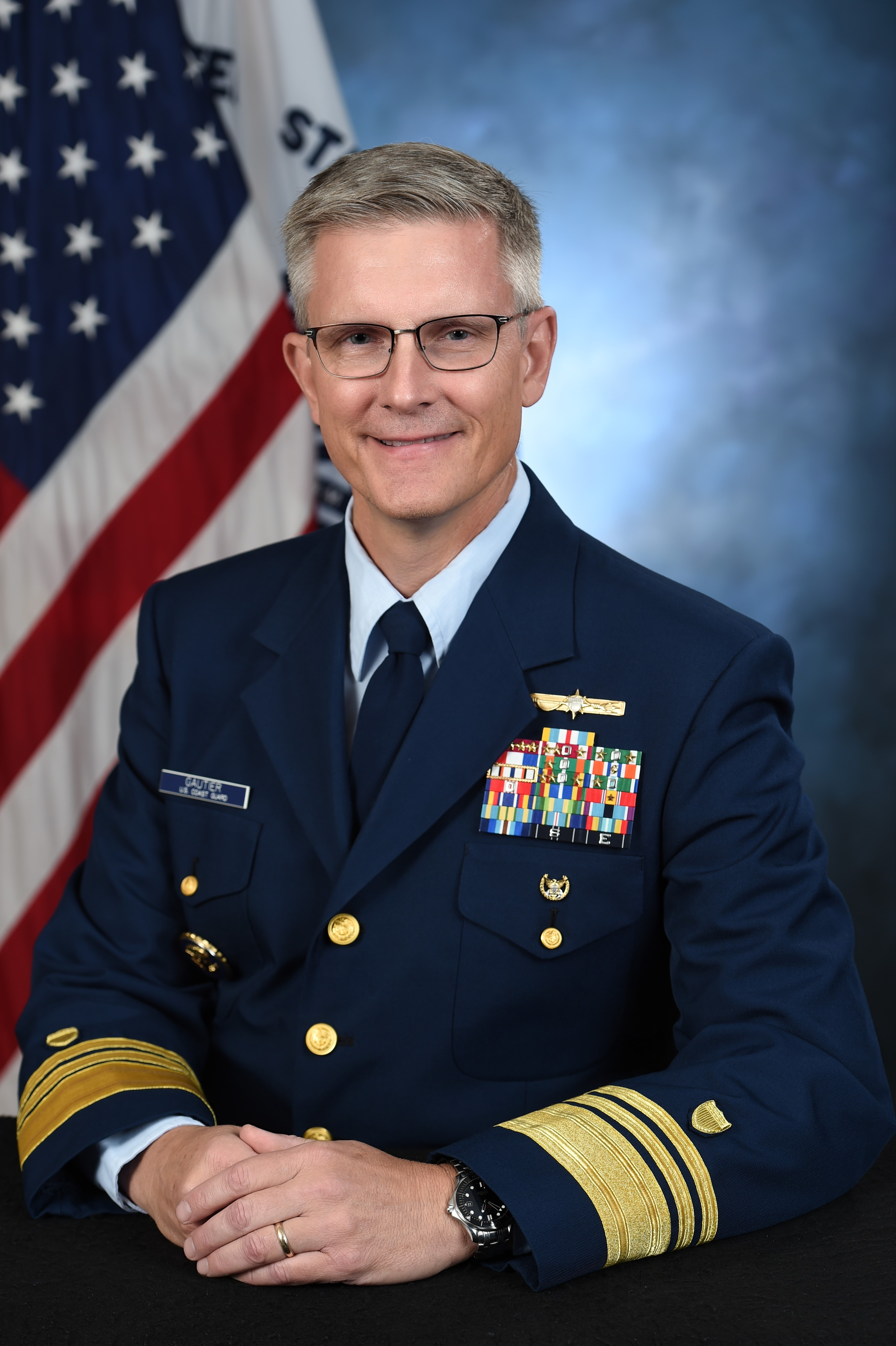
- Official portrait, 2022
- Born: 25 September 1965 (age 61); Brooklyn, New York, U.S.
- Education: United States Coast Guard Academy (BS); University of Michigan (MS); National War College (MS)
- Military career
- Allegiance: United States
- Branch: United States Coast Guard
- Service years: 1987–2025
- Rank: Vice Admiral
- Nickname: Pete
- Commands: Coast Guard Eleventh District; Coast Guard Sector New Orleans; Coast Guard Gulf Strike Team; Loran Station Gesashi
- Awards: Defense Superior Service Medal; Legion of Merit (3)

Peter Williams Gautier (born 25 September 1965) is a retired United States Coast Guard vice admiral who last served as the deputy commandant for operations. He previously served as the deputy commander of the Coast Guard Pacific Area. He briefly served as acting vice commandant of the Coast Guard in 2025, while Admiral Kevin Lunday served as acting commandant.

Born in Brooklyn, New York City on 25 September 1965, Gautier graduated from the United States Coast Guard Academy in 1987 with a B.S. degree in marine engineering. He later earned an M.S. degree in chemical engineering from the University of Michigan in 1993 and an M.S. degree in national security strategy from the National War College in 2009.

In April 2022, he was nominated for promotion to vice admiral and appointment as deputy commandant for operations.

Military offices
Preceded by Todd A. Sokalzuk	Commander of the Coast Guard Eleventh District; 2018–2020	Succeeded by Brian K. Penoyer
Preceded by Nathan A. Moore	Deputy Commander of the Coast Guard Pacific Area; 2020–2022	Succeeded by Matthew W. Sibley
Preceded by Linda L. Fagan	Commander of the Coast Guard Pacific Area; Acting; 2021	Succeeded by Michael F. McAllister
Preceded by Scott Buschman	Deputy Commandant for Operations of the United States Coast Guard; 2022–2025	Succeeded by Thomas G. Allan Jr. Acting
