= Admiral Perry =

Admiral Perry may refer to:

- Douglas G. Perry (born 1967), U.S. Navy rear admiral
- Ellis L. Perry (1919–2002), U.S. Coast Guard vice admiral
- John R. Perry (admiral) (1899–1955), U.S. Navy rear admiral

== See also ==
- Matthew C. Perry (1794–1858), U.S. Navy commodore (admiral-equivalent rank)
- Oliver Hazard Perry (1785–1819), U.S. Navy commodore (admiral-equivalent rank)
- Admiral Parry (disambiguation)
