= Tiongson =

Tiongson is a surname. Notable people with the surname include:

- Andrew Tiongson (born 1967), American coast guard admiral
- Caelan Tiongson (born 1992), Filipino basketball player
- Juami Tiongson (born 1991), Filipino basketball player
- Nicanor Tiongson (fl. 1986), Filipino writer and academic
