= Richard Herr =

Richard Herr may refer to:

- Richard D. Herr (born 1941), vice admiral in the United States Coast Guard
- Richard Herr (historian) (1922–2022), American historian and hispanist
