= Steven D. Poulin =

US Coast Guard admiral (born 1962)

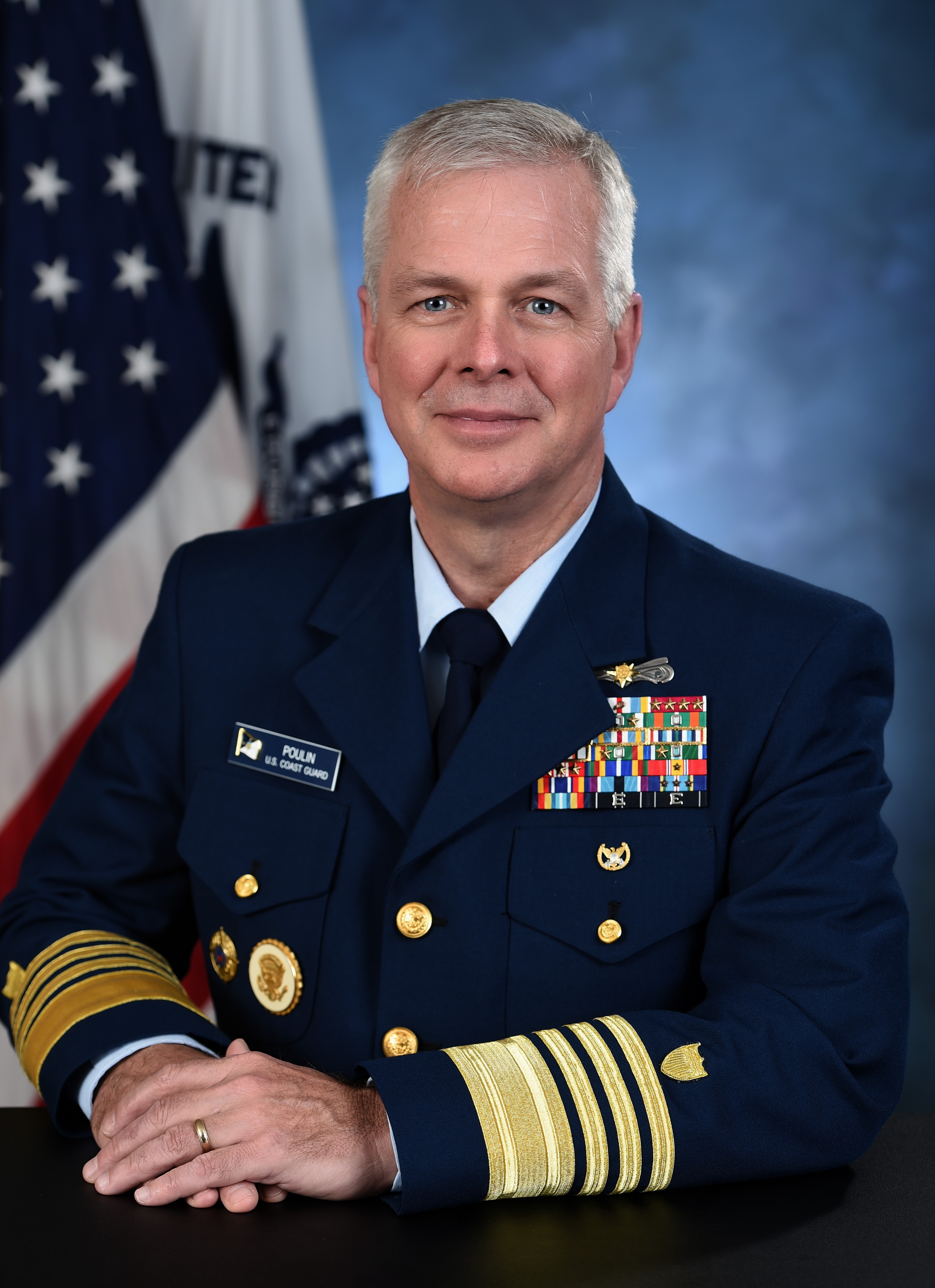
- Official portrait, 2022

33rd Vice Commandant of the Coast Guard
- In office May 31, 2022 – June 13, 2024
- President: Joe Biden
- Commandant: Karl L. Schultz; Linda L. Fagan
- Preceded by: Linda L. Fagan
- Succeeded by: Kevin Lunday

Personal details
- Born: January 1, 1962 (age 64) Kittery, Maine, U.S.
- Spouse: Sherry A. Poulin
- Education: United States Army War College (MSS); George Washington University (ML); University of Miami School of Law (JD); University of South Alabama (MPA); United States Coast Guard Academy (BS)
- Military career
- Allegiance: United States
- Branch: United States Coast Guard
- Service years: 1984–2024
- Rank: Admiral
- Commands: Coast Guard Atlantic Area; First Coast Guard District; DWH Incident Command Post Mobile; Coast Guard Sector Mobile
- Awards: Coast Guard Distinguished Service Medal; Defense Superior Service Medal (2); Legion of Merit (5)
- Steven D. Poulin's voice Poulin's opening statement at a House Transportation subcommittee hearing on drug interdictions Recorded June 4, 2019

Steven D. Poulin (born January 1, 1962) is a retired United States Coast Guard admiral who served as the 33rd Vice Commandant of the Coast Guard from 2022 to 2024. He most recently served as commander of the Coast Guard Atlantic Area and Coast Guard Defense Force East from 2020 to 2022. As Atlantic Area commander, he had operational control over Coast Guard missions covering the Rocky Mountains to the Persian Gulf, covering 5 Coast Guard districts and 40 states. He previously served as director of operations for the United States Southern Command, commander of the Coast Guard First District, and Judge Advocate General and Chief Counsel of the Coast Guard.

In April 2022, Poulin was nominated for promotion to admiral and assignment as vice commandant of the Coast Guard, succeeding Linda L. Fagan. His nomination was sent to the United States Senate on April 7, 2022, and he was confirmed on May 11.

== Awards and decorations ==
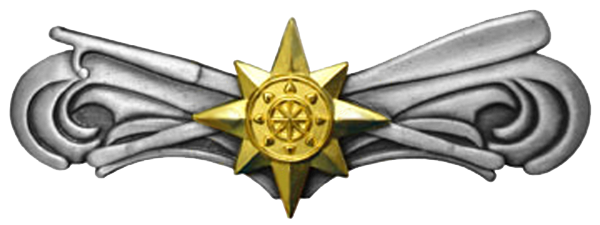

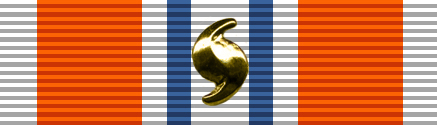

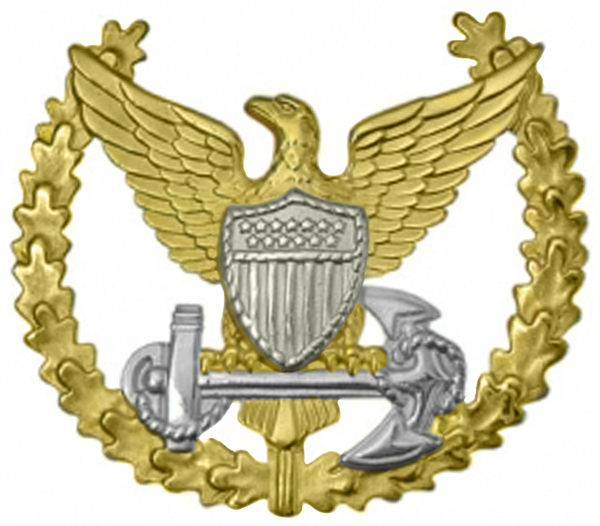

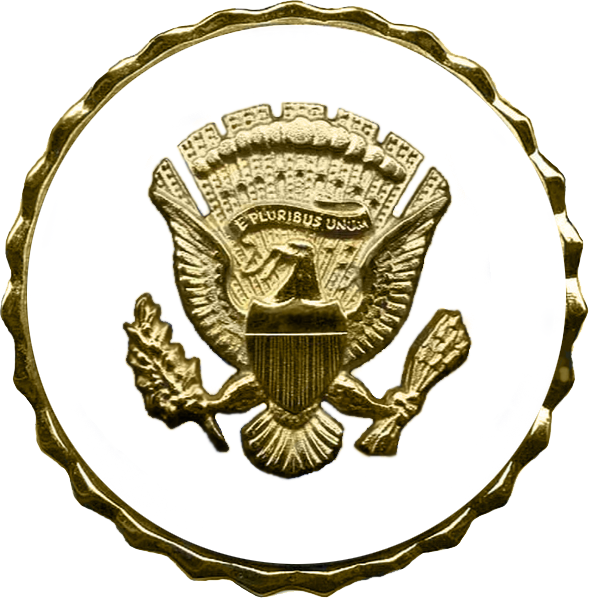
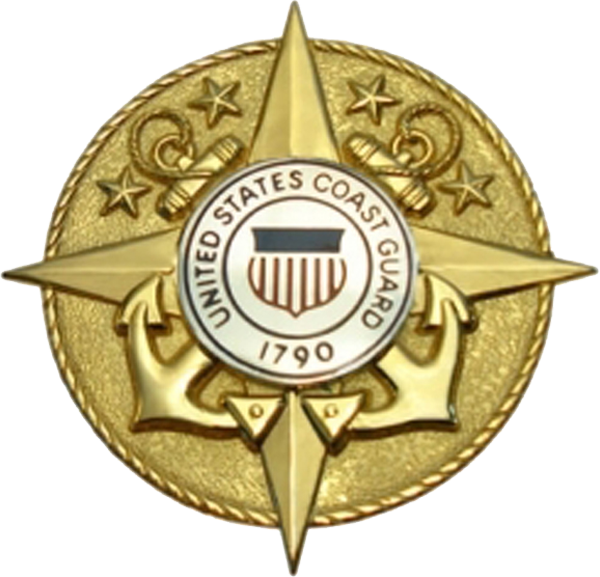

| Badge | Advanced Boat Force Operations Insignia | | |
| 1st row | Coast Guard Distinguished Service Medal | Defense Superior Service Medal with one bronze oak leaf cluster | Legion of Merit with four gold award stars |
| 2nd row | Meritorious Service Medal with "O" device and three award stars | Coast Guard Commendation Medal with "O" device and two award stars | Coast Guard Achievement Medal with "O" device |
| 3rd row | Coast Guard Presidential Unit Citation with "hurricane symbol" | Joint Meritorious Unit Award | Department of Homeland Security Outstanding Unit Award |
| 4th row | Secretary of Transportation Outstanding Unit Award | Coast Guard Unit Commendation with "O" device and award star | Coast Guard Meritorious Unit Commendation with "O" device and award star |
| 5th row | Meritorious Team Commendation with three award stars | Coast Guard Bicentennial Unit Commendation | National Defense Service Medal with one bronze service star |
| 6th row | Global War on Terrorism Service Medal | Humanitarian Service Medal | Special Operations Service Ribbon with three service stars |
| 7th row | Coast Guard Sea Service Ribbon | Rifle Expert Marksmanship Medal | Pistol Expert Marksmanship Medal |
| Badge | Coast Guard Command Ashore insignia | | |
| Badges | Vice Presidential Service Badge | Commandant Staff Badge | | |

Military offices
| Preceded by Frederick J. Kenney | Judge Advocate General and Chief Counsel of the Coast Guard; 2014–2016 | Succeeded by Steven J. Andersen |
| Preceded by Linda L. Fagan | Commander of the Coast Guard First District; 2016–2018 | Succeeded by Andrew J. Tiongson |
| Preceded by Daniel B. Abel | Director of Operations of the United States Southern Command; 2018–2020 | Succeeded by Andrew J. Tiongson |
| Preceded by Scott A. Buschman | Director of the Homeland Security Joint Task Force – East and Commander of the Coast Guard Atlantic Area; 2020–2022 | Succeeded by Kevin Lunday |
| Preceded by Linda L. Fagan | Vice Commandant of the Coast Guard; 2022–2024 | Succeeded by Kevin Lunday |
