= Admiral Parry =

Admiral Parry may refer to:

- Chris Parry (Royal Navy officer) (born 1953), British Royal Navy rear admiral
- Edward Parry (Royal Navy officer) (1893–1972), British Royal Navy admiral
- William Parry (Royal Navy officer, born 1705) (1705–1779), British Royal Navy admiral
- William Edward Parry (1790–1855), British Royal Navy rear admiral

== See also ==
- Admiral Perry (disambiguation)
