= Daniel Abel =

US Coast Guard admiral

Daniel B. Abel
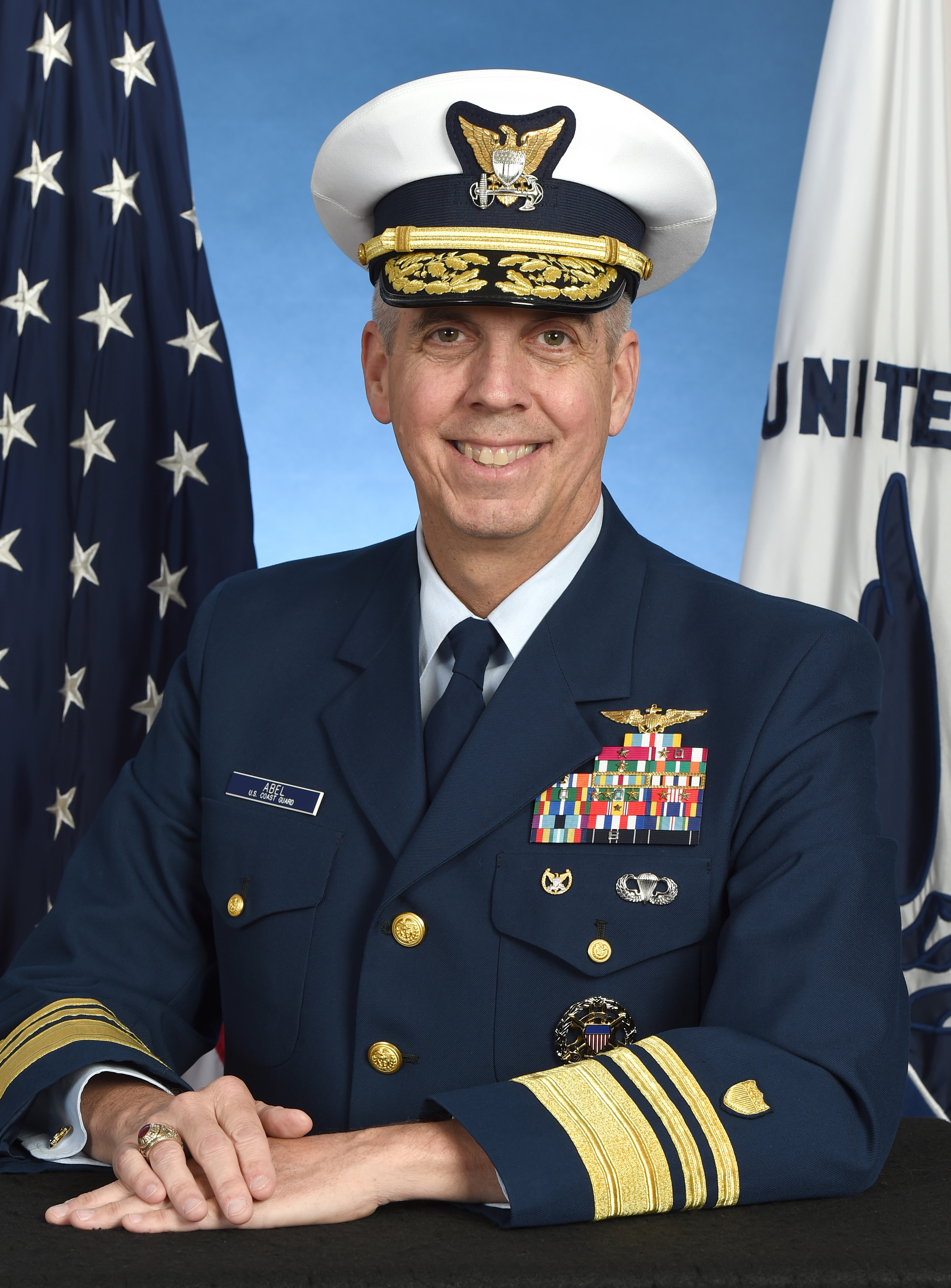
- Official portrait, 2018
- Born: 11 May 1961 (age 65); Dayton, Ohio, U.S.
- Education: United States Coast Guard Academy (BS); College of William & Mary (MBA); Industrial College of the Armed Forces (MS)
- Military career
- Allegiance: United States of America
- Branch: United States Coast Guard
- Service years: 1983–2020
- Rank: Vice Admiral
- Nickname: Dan
- Commands: Seventeenth Coast Guard District; First Coast Guard District; Coast Guard Air Station Cape Cod; Coast Guard Air Station San Francisco
- Awards: Defense Superior Service Medal; Legion of Merit (4)

Daniel Bernhard Abel (born 11 May 1961) is a retired United States Coast Guard vice admiral who last served as Deputy Commandant for Operations from June 2018 to June 2020. He previously served as Director of Operations for United States Southern Command.

Born in Dayton, Ohio on 11 May 1961, Abel graduated from the United States Coast Guard Academy in 1983 with a B.S. degree in civil engineering. He later earned an M.B.A. degree from the College of William & Mary in 1994 and an M.S. degree in national security strategy from the Industrial College of the Armed Forces in 2005.

Military offices
Preceded by Daniel A. Neptun	Commander of the Coast Guard First District; 2012–2014	Succeeded by Linda L. Fagan
Preceded by Thomas P. Ostebo	Commander of the Coast Guard Seventeenth District; 2014–2016	Succeeded by Michael F. McAllister
Preceded by Karl L. Schultz	Director of Operations of the United States Southern Command; 2016–2018	Succeeded by Steven D. Poulin
Preceded by Charles W. Ray	Deputy Commandant for Operations of the United States Coast Guard; 2018–2020	Succeeded by Scott Buschman
