= Paul F. Thomas =

U.S. Navy admiral

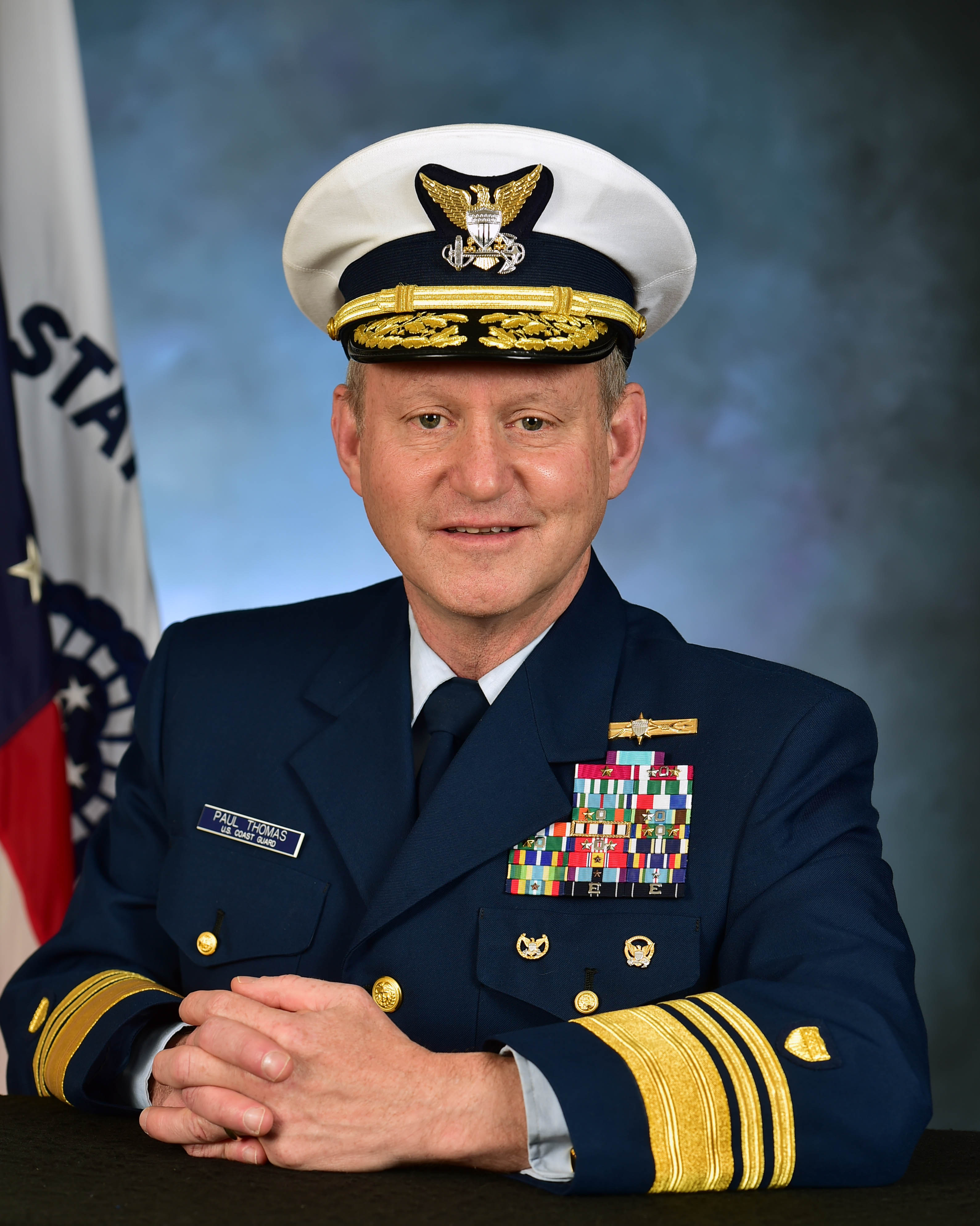
- Born: November 21, 1963 (age 62); Schenectady, New York, U.S.
- Alma mater: United States Coast Guard Academy (BS); Massachusetts Institute of Technology (MS)
- Spouse: Mary A. Thomas
- Children: 1
- Military career
- Allegiance: United States
- Branch: United States Coast Guard
- Service years: 1985–2024
- Rank: Vice Admiral
- Commands: Eighth Coast Guard District; Coast Guard Sector Jacksonville
- Awards: Coast Guard Distinguished Service Medal; Legion of Merit

Paul F. Thomas (born November 21, 1963) is a retired United States Coast Guard vice admiral who last served as Deputy Commandant for Mission Support from 2021 to 2024. He previously served as Deputy for Personnel Readiness to the Deputy Commandant for Mission Support from 2019 to 2021, with tours as commander of the Eighth Coast Guard District from 2017 to 2019 and commander of Coast Guard Sector Jacksonville from 2006 to 2009.

Thomas graduated from the United States Coast Guard Academy in 1985 with a B.S. degree in naval architecture and marine engineering. He later earned separate M.S. degrees in naval architecture and marine engineering from the Massachusetts Institute of Technology.

Military offices
Preceded by ???	Commander of Coast Guard Sector Jacksonville; 2006–2009	Succeeded by Andy A. Blomme
Preceded by ???	Commander of the Eighth Coast Guard District; 2017–2019	Succeeded by John P. Nadeau
Preceded by Gary C. Rasciot
Deputy for Personnel Readiness to the Deputy Commandant for Mission Support; 2019–2021	Succeeded by Joanna M. Nunan	
Preceded by Michael F. McAllister	Deputy Commandant for Mission Support of the United States Coast Guard; 2021–2024	Succeeded by Thomas G. Allan Jr.
