= Commandant of the Coast Guard =

Highest-ranking member of the United States Coast Guard

- Seal of the Coast Guard

- Flag of the commandant

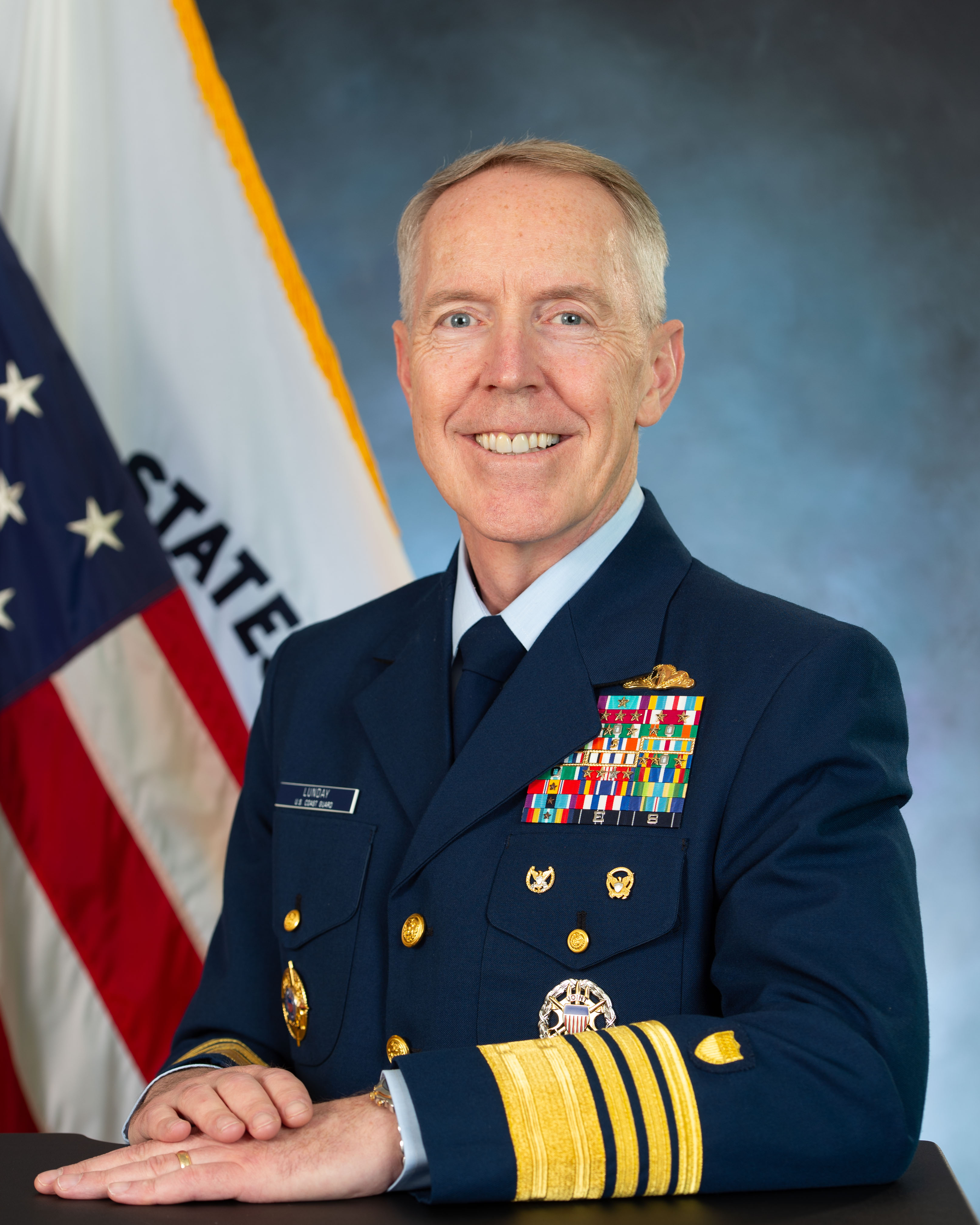
- Incumbent; Admiral Kevin E. Lunday since 15 January 2026
- United States Coast Guard
- Type: Service chief
- Reports to: Secretary of Homeland Security
- Seat: Douglas A. Munro Coast Guard Headquarters Building, Washington, D.C.
- Appointer: The president; with advice and consent of the Senate
- Term length: 4 years, renewable
- Constituting instrument: 14 U.S.C. § 302; 14 U.S.C. § 504
- Formation: 14 December 1889
- First holder: Leonard G. Shepard
- Deputy: Vice Commandant of the Coast Guard
- Website: uscg.mil/seniorleadership

The commandant of the Coast Guard is the service chief and highest-ranking member of the United States Coast Guard. The commandant is an admiral, appointed for a four-year term by the president of the United States upon confirmation by the United States Senate. The commandant is assisted by a vice commandant, who is also an admiral, and two area commanders (U.S. Coast Guard Pacific Area and U.S. Coast Guard Atlantic Area) and two deputy commandants (deputy commandant for operations and deputy commandant for mission support), all of whom are vice admirals.

Though the United States Coast Guard is one of the six military branches of the United States, unlike the other service chiefs, the commandant of the Coast Guard is not a member of the Joint Chiefs of Staff. The commandant is, however, entitled to the same supplemental pay as each member of the Joint Chiefs, per 37 U.S.C. § 414(a)(5) ($4,000 per annum in 2009), and is accorded privilege of the floor under Senate Rule XXIII(1) as a de facto Joint Chiefs of Staff member during presidential addresses.

The commandant maintains operational command over the Coast Guard, unlike the chiefs of the other services, who serve only administrative roles. Thus, while the operational chain of command for the other services (per the Goldwater–Nichols Act) goes from the president through the secretary of defense to the combatant commanders of the unified combatant commands, command and control of the Coast Guard goes from the president through the secretary of homeland security (or secretary of defense, when the Coast Guard is acting as a service in the Department of the Navy) through the commandant. Prior to the creation of the Department of Homeland Security in 2003, the United States Coast Guard or its predecessor, the Revenue Cutter Service operated under and the commandant reported to the secretary of transportation from 1966 to 2003, and the secretary of the treasury from 1790 until 1966.

As of 15 January 2026, the 28th commandant of the Coast Guard is Admiral Kevin Lunday.

== History ==
The title of commandant dates to a 1923 act that distributed the commissioned line and engineer officers of the U.S. Coast Guard in grades. Before 1923, the rank and title of the head of the Coast Guard was "captain-commandant." The rank "captain-commandant" originated in the Revenue Cutter Service in 1908. The original holder of that rank was the Chief of the Revenue Cutter Service (also known as the Revenue-Marine). The Coast Guard traces the lineage of commandants back to Captain Leonard G. Shepard, chief of the Revenue Marine-Bureau, even though he never officially received the title of captain-commandant. The captain-commandant position was created in 1908 when Captain Worth G. Ross was the first to actually hold the position. Although he was retired, Ross's predecessor, Captain Charles F. Shoemaker, was elevated to the rank of captain-commandant. Shoemaker's predecessor, Captain Shepard, had already died and was not elevated to the rank.

== Chiefs of the Revenue Marine Bureau ==
Chiefs exercised centralized control over the Revenue-Marine Bureau.

- Captain Alexander V. Fraser, USRM, 1843–1848
- Captain Richard Evans, USRM, 1848–1849

In 1849 the Revenue-Marine Bureau was dissolved, and the Revenue Marine fell under the control the commissioner of customs until the Revenue-Marine Bureau was again established in 1869.

- N. Broughton Devereux, 1869–1871
- Sumner I. Kimball, 1871–1878
- Ezra Clark, 1878–1885
- Peter Bonnett, 1885–1889

== List of commandants ==
There have been 28 commandants of the Coast Guard since the office of chief of the Revenue-Marine Bureau was transferred to a military billet.

| No. | Portrait | Name (born-died) | Term of office | | | Notes |
| No. | Portrait | Name (born-died) | Took office | Left office | Time in office | Notes |
|---|---|---|---|---|---|---|
| 1 | | Captain; Leonard G. Shepard | 14 December 1889 | 14 March 1895 | 5 years, 90 days | Shepard became the first military Chief of the "Revenue-Marine Division" of the Treasury Department and is considered to be the first Commandant. |
| 2 | | Captain; Charles F. Shoemaker | 19 March 1895 | 27 March 1905 | 10 years, 8 days | On 8 May 1908, Shoemaker was promoted to the rank of Captain-Commandant on the Retired List by Act of Congress. |
| 3 | | Captain-commandant; Worth G. Ross | 25 April 1905 | 30 April 1911 | 6 years, 5 days | Ross was instrumental in the establishment of what was to become the U.S. Coast Guard Academy in New London, Connecticut. |
| 4 | | Commodore; Ellsworth P. Bertholf | 19 June 1911 | 30 June 1919 | 8 years, 11 days | Served during the merger of the U.S. Revenue Cutter Service with the U.S. Life-Saving Service to form the U.S. Coast Guard. Was the first Coast Guard officer to achieve flag rank. (Note: Bertholf was reappointed Captain-Commandant on 19 June 1915 following the merger of the Revenue Cutter Service into the newly formed Coast Guard) |
| 5 | | Rear Admiral; William E. Reynolds | 2 October 1919 | 11 January 1924 | 4 years, 101 days | Reynolds was the first Coast Guard officer to be promoted to the rank of rear admiral. |
| 6 | | Rear Admiral; Frederick C. Billard | 11 January 1924 | 17 May 1932 | 8 years, 127 days | Billard was appointed to three consecutive terms as Commandant and died in office 17 May 1932, serving through the Prohibition Era and reorganization of the academy. |
| 7 | | Rear Admiral; Harry G. Hamlet | 14 June 1932 | 14 June 1936 | 4 years, 0 days | Hamlet persuaded Congress to dismiss efforts to merge the Coast Guard with the U.S. Navy. Continued serving after term as Commandant was over and eventually retired as a vice admiral by act of Congress. |
| 8 | | Admiral; Russell R. Waesche | 14 June 1936 | 1 January 1946 | 9 years, 201 days | First Commandant to be promoted to vice admiral and admiral. Commandant during World War II and helped the Coast Guard remain a separate distinct service while it was assigned to the U.S. Navy. Oversaw the largest manpower buildup in Coast Guard history and was instrumental in the formation of the U.S. Coast Guard Auxiliary and the U.S. Coast Guard Reserve. (Note: Appointed Commandant as rear admiral. Appointed admiral 4 April 1945. First officer to attain ranks of vice admiral and admiral.) |
| 9 | | Admiral; Joseph F. Farley | 1 January 1946 | 1 January 1950 | 4 years, 0 days | Farley served during the difficult Post-World War II era when additional statutory responsibilities were being added to the Coast Guard's mission structure and personnel allowances were being reduced. |
| 10 | | Vice Admiral; Merlin O'Neill | 1 January 1950 | 1 June 1954 | 4 years, 151 days | O'Neill directed the increase in port security activities required by the passage of the Magnuson Act and revitalized the Coast Guard Reserve program emphasizing its defense mission during wartime. (Note: O'Neill retired from the Coast Guard on 1 June 1954 with the rank of admiral.) |
| 11 | | Admiral; Alfred C. Richmond | 1 June 1954 | 1 June 1962 | 8 years, 0 days | Richmond served two full terms as Commandant and was the United States delegate to many international maritime conferences during his tenure. (Note: Appointed as a vice admiral and received promotion to admiral on 1 June 1960 by Public Law 86-474, under which all Coast Guard commandants thereafter are appointed to the rank of admiral.) |
| 12 | | Admiral; Edwin J. Roland | 1 June 1962 | 1 June 1966 | 4 years, 0 days | Roland oversaw the replacement of many World War II era cutters under fleet modernization programs during his tenure. He assisted the U.S. Navy with operations in Vietnam by supplying crews and cutters for Operation Market Time. |
| 13 | | Admiral; Willard J. Smith | 1 June 1966 | 1 June 1970 | 4 years, 0 days | Smith was the Commandant of the Coast Guard when the service was transferred from the Department of the Treasury to the newly formed Department of Transportation. |
| 14 | | Admiral; Chester R. Bender | 1 June 1970 | 1 June 1974 | 4 years, 0 days | The Coast Guard undertook new statutory responsibilities in the areas of marine safety, environmental protection and law enforcement during his tenure, however Bender is best known for his changes in the dress uniform worn by Coast Guardsmen; sometimes referred to as "Bender's Blues". |
| 15 | | Admiral; Owen W. Siler | 1 June 1974 | 1 June 1978 | 4 years, 0 days | Several changes in environmental duties occurred during Siler's tenure as well as a step-up in drug interdiction activities. Under his tenure, the replacement of aging cutters was given budget priority, and the first women entered the Coast Guard Academy. |
| 16 | | Admiral; John B. Hayes | 1 June 1978 | 28 May 1982 | 3 years, 361 days | Hayes experienced severe budget problems during his tenure while fending off a move in Congress to transfer the Coast Guard to the Navy. Drug interdiction was increased and several high-profile search and rescue cases occurred during his watch which helped keep the Coast Guard in the public eye. |
| 17 | | Admiral; James S. Gracey | 28 May 1982 | 30 May 1986 | 4 years, 2 days | Gracey faced tight budgets at the same time he was successful at replacing aging cutters. Increasing the Coast Guard's role in the defense of coastal waters was accomplished. |
| 18 | | Admiral; Paul A. Yost Jr. | 30 May 1986 | 31 May 1990 | 4 years, 1 day | Yost successfully maintained the service through difficult budget battles each year. In doing so, he also emphasized three 'primary mission areas": maritime law enforcement, maritime safety, and defense readiness. There was an increased emphasis on military/naval capabilities of the service. |
| 19 | | Admiral; J. William Kime | 31 May 1990 | 1 June 1994 | 4 years, 1 day | Kime led the service during the end of the Cold War, collapse of the Soviet Union, the Persian Gulf War's Operations Desert Shield and Desert Storm, as well as increasing operations in drug interdiction and environmental law enforcement. |
| 20 | | Admiral; Robert E. Kramek | 1 June 1994 | 30 May 1998 | 3 years, 363 days | During his tenure as Commandant, he successfully led the service through difficult budget battles each year and directed the "streamlining" plan that was mandated by the National Performance Review and "Mandate for Change." |
| 21 | | Admiral; James Loy | 30 May 1998 | 30 May 2002 | 4 years, 0 days | As the USCG Commandant, Loy reacted to the September 11 attacks of 2001. In the short term, he supervised the resumption of sea-borne trade throughout the U.S., after the USCG had shut down most major ports after the attacks. In the long term, Loy led the U.S. delegation to the International Maritime Organization (IMO), and was instrumental in ensuring that the International Ship and Port Facility Security Code was approved and implemented in 2002. The code came into effect in 2004. |
| 22 | | Admiral; Thomas H. Collins | 30 May 2002 | 25 May 2006 | 3 years, 360 days | Collins guided the U.S. Coast Guard in the aftermath of the September 11 attacks of 2001. As part of this effort to tighten maritime security, Collins encouraged people involved in the maritime industry and the recreational boating industry to report suspicious activity to the National Response Center. This program was extended and formalized as America's Waterway Watch in 2005. |
| 23 | | Admiral; Thad W. Allen | 25 May 2006 | 25 May 2010 | 4 years, 0 days | Allen led the effort to reform and modernize all aspects of the Coast Guard, improving and sustaining Mission Execution. Admiral Allen continually stated his ultimate aim was to make the Coast Guard a "change-centric" organization capable of quickly and efficiently adapting to meet the growing and ever-changing demands of the future. Additionally he was the first high-ranking member of the Federal government to embrace social media, pioneering the effort to connect to his audience through all manners of digital technology. During his final months in office he led the Coast Guard's exemplary response to the earthquake in Haiti and then, first as Commandant and concurrently as the National Incident Commander, he led the nation's response to the Deepwater Horizon oil spill, holding the latter post well after his tenure as Commandant had come to a close. |
| 24 | | Admiral; Robert J. Papp Jr. | 25 May 2010 | 30 May 2014 | 4 years, 5 days | |
| 25 | | Admiral; Paul F. Zukunft | 30 May 2014 | 1 June 2018 | 4 years, 2 days | |
| 26 | | Admiral; Karl L. Schultz | 1 June 2018 | 1 June 2022 | 4 years, 0 days | |
| 27 | | Admiral; Linda L. Fagan | 1 June 2022 | 21 January 2025 | 2 years, 234 days | Fagan is the first woman to serve as Coast Guard Commandant, and simultaneously the first woman to lead a military branch in the United States. |
| – | | Admiral; Kevin E. Lunday | 21 January 2025 | 15 January 2026 | 359 days | Served as acting commandant from January 2025 to January 2026, prior to being confirmed by the Senate to the office. |
| 28 | | Admiral; Kevin E. Lunday | 15 January 2026 | Incumbent | 263 days | |

== See also ==
- Vice Commandant of the Coast Guard
- Master Chief Petty Officer of the Coast Guard

== Notes ==
=== References cited ===
- "Captain Leonard G. Shepard". U.S. Coast Guard Notable People. U.S. Coast Guard Historian's Office.
- "Commandants". U.S. Coast Guard Notable People. U.S. Coast Guard Historian's Office.
- "Vice Admiral Merlin O'Neill". U.S. Coast Guard Notable People. U.S. Coast Guard Historian's Office.
- Kroll, C. Douglas (2002). Commodore Ellsworth P. Bertholf: First Commandant of the Coast Guard. Naval Institute Press, Annapolis, Maryland. ISBN 978-1-55750-474-6.
- Noble, Dennis L. (1990). Historical Register U.S. Revenue Cutter Service Officers, 1790–1914. Coast Guard Historian's Office, U.S. Coast Guard Headquarters, Washington, DC.
