= James C. Card =

United States Coast Guard vice admiral (born 1942)

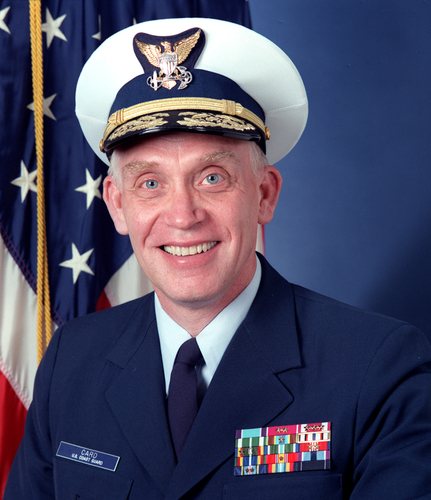
- Born: August 8, 1942 (age 84); Hillside, Illinois, U.S.
- Military career
- Allegiance: United States
- Branch: United States Coast Guard
- Service years: c. 1964 – 2000
- Rank: Vice admiral
- Commands: Vice Commandant of the United States Coast Guard

James Conrad Card (born August 8, 1942) is a retired vice admiral in the United States Coast Guard who served as Vice Commandant from 1998 to 2000.

He was previously Commander, Coast Guard Pacific Area, Eleventh Coast Guard District, U.S. Maritime Defense Zone Pacific, and Regional Emergency Transportation Coordinator, Chief of Staff, Thirteenth Coast Guard District, Assistant Commandant for Marine Safety and Environmental Protection at Coast Guard Headquarters, and Commander of the Eighth Coast Guard District. A 1964 graduate of the U.S. Coast Guard Academy, Card earned two masters’ degrees, one in naval architecture and one in mechanical engineering, from the Massachusetts Institute of Technology in 1970. He is also a 1986 graduate of the Industrial College of the Armed Forces.

His awards include the Distinguished Service Medal, three Legion of Merit awards, four Meritorious Service Medals and a U.S. Coast Guard Commendation Medal. He is the 1997 recipient of the Society of Naval Architects and Marine Engineers’ Vice Admiral Jerry Land Medal for outstanding accomplishments in the marine field. He also received the prestigious Rear Admiral Shepheard Award from the Chamber of Shipping of America in recognition of his achievement in merchant marine safety. Throughout his career, Card has represented the United States as a member of delegations to the International Maritime Organization, in London, and headed the Delegations to the IMO Maritime Safety and Marine Environmental Protection Committee.

Card was born in Hillside, Illinois in 1942. He is married to Jean Howell and has two sons.

Military offices
Preceded by Richard D. Herr	Vice Commandant of the United States Coast Guard; 1998–2000	Succeeded by Thomas H. Collins
