= Michael F. McAllister =

US Coast Guard admiral

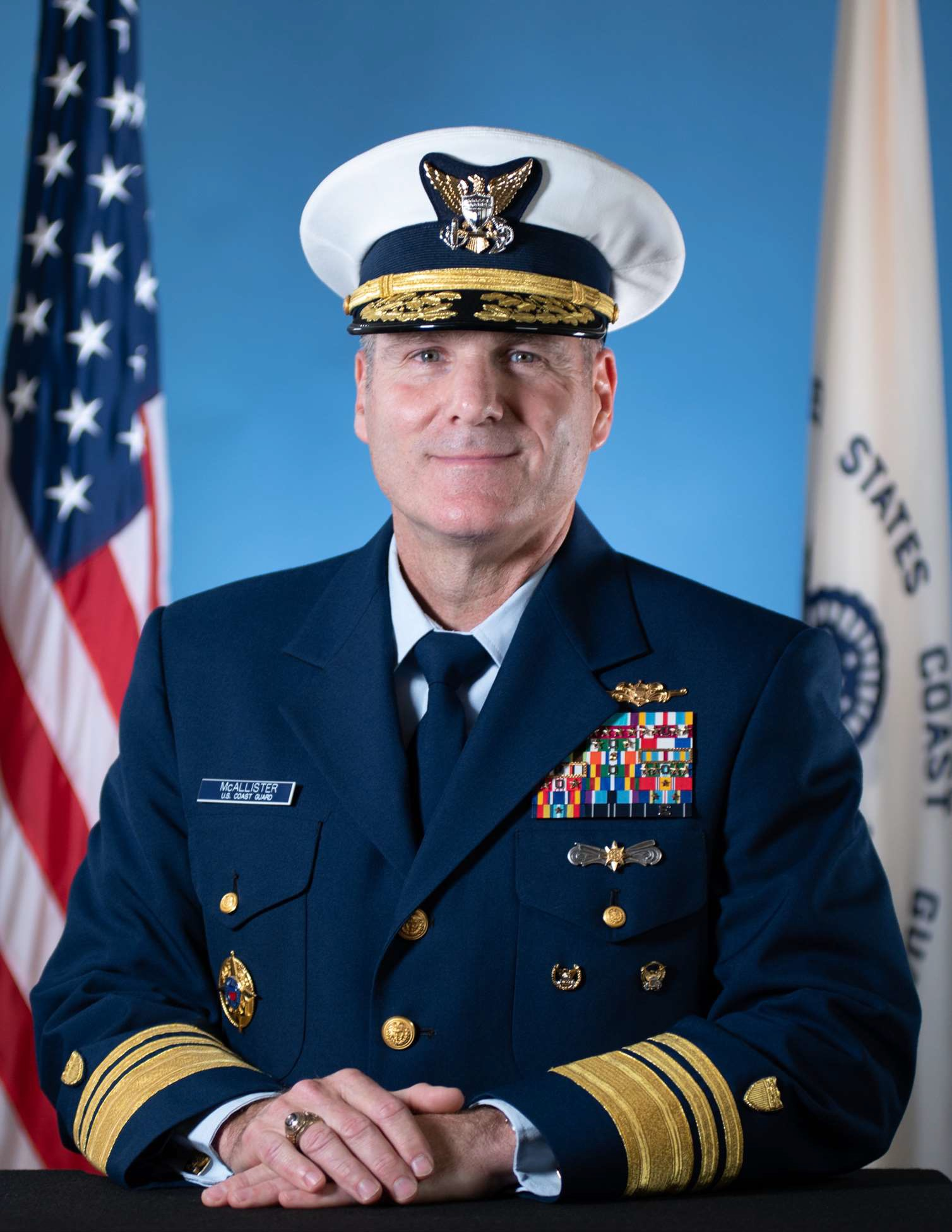
- Born: December 1, 1964 (age 61); Somerville, Massachusetts, U.S.
- Alma mater: Massachusetts Institute of Technology (MBA); University of Illinois (MSCE); United States Coast Guard Academy (BSCE)
- Spouse: Brigitte McAllister
- Military career
- Allegiance: United States
- Branch: United States Coast Guard
- Service years: 1986–2022
- Rank: Vice Admiral
- Nickname: Mike
- Commands: Coast Guard Pacific Area; Seventeenth Coast Guard District; Coast Guard Sector Charleston
- Awards: Coast Guard Distinguished Service Medal; Defense Superior Service Medal; Legion of Merit (5)

Michael F. McAllister (born December 1, 1964) is a retired United States Coast Guard vice admiral who last served as commander of the Coast Guard Pacific Area and Defense Force West from June 30, 2021, to July 8, 2022. He most recently served as Deputy Commandant for Mission Support and, prior to that, as commander of the Coast Guard Seventeenth District.

McAllister graduated from the United States Coast Guard Academy in 1986 with a Bachelor of Science degree in civil engineering. He later earned a Master of Science degree in civil engineering from the University of Illinois at Urbana–Champaign in 1991. McAllister is a registered professional engineer in the state of Washington. He also received a Master of Business Administration degree from the Massachusetts Institute of Technology in 2004.

Military offices
Preceded by John Cameron	Commander of Coast Guard Sector Charleston; 2007–2010	Succeeded by Michael F. White Jr.
Preceded by Daniel B. Abel	Commander of the Coast Guard Seventeenth District; 2016–2018	Succeeded by Matthew T. Bell Jr.
Preceded by Sandra L. Stosz	Deputy Commandant for Mission Support of the United States Coast Guard; 2018–2021	Succeeded by Paul F. Thomas
Preceded by Peter W. Gautier; Acting	Commander of the Coast Guard Pacific Area and Defense Force West; 2021–2022	Succeeded by Andrew J. Tiongson
