= Scott Buschman =

US Coast Guard admiral

Scott A. Buschman
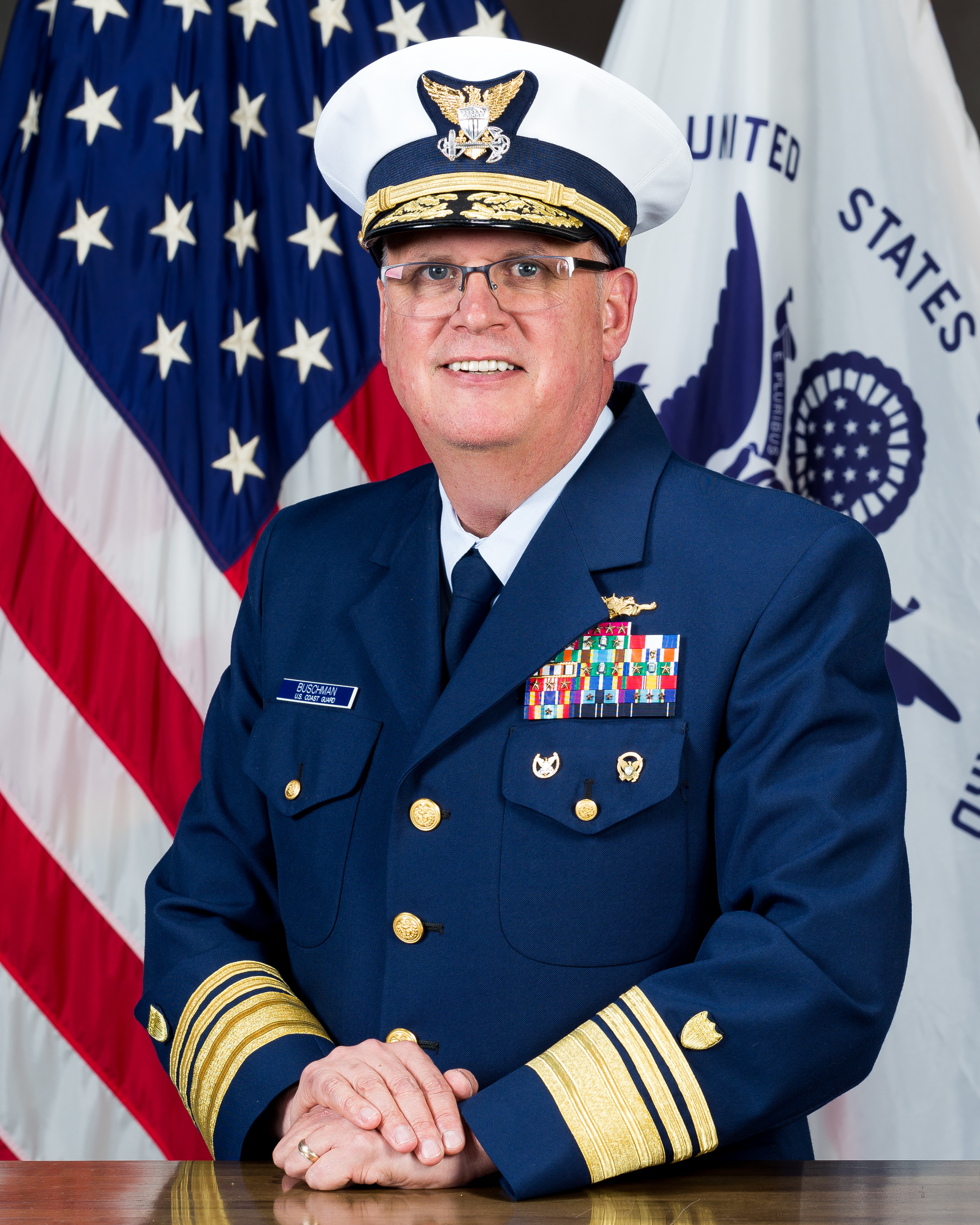
- Born: February 12, 1962 (age 64); Huntington, New York, U.S.
- Education: Massachusetts Institute of Technology (MBA); George Washington University (MPA); United States Coast Guard Academy (BS)
- Spouse: Kimberly Merta Buschman
- Military career
- Allegiance: United States
- Branch: United States Coast Guard
- Service years: 1984–2022
- Rank: Vice Admiral
- Commands: Coast Guard Atlantic Area; Seventh Coast Guard District; Coast Guard Force Readiness Command; Coast Guard Sector Key West
- Awards: Legion of Merit (5)

Scott Andrew Buschman (born February 12, 1962) is a retired United States Coast Guard vice admiral who served as Deputy Commandant for Operations. He previously served as Atlantic Area commander and director of the Homeland Security Joint Task Force – East.

Military offices
Preceded by ???	Commander of Coast Guard Sector Key West; 2006–2009	Succeeded by Pat DeQuattro
Preceded by Stephen E. Mehling	Commander of the Coast Guard Force Readiness Command; 2013–2015	Succeeded by David G. Throop
Preceded by Joseph A. Servidio	Deputy Commander of the Coast Guard Atlantic Area; 2017–2018	Succeeded by ???
Preceded by Karl L. Schultz	Director of the Homeland Security Joint Task Force – East; 2018–2020	Succeeded by Steven D. Poulin
Preceded by Karl L. Schultz	Commander of the Coast Guard Atlantic Area; 2019–2020	Succeeded by Steven D. Poulin
Preceded by Daniel B. Abel	Deputy Commandant for Operations of the United States Coast Guard; 2020–2022	Succeeded by Peter Gautier
