= William D. Shields =

- Born: August 19, 1907; Philadelphia, Pennsylvania, U.S.
- Died: March 28, 1989 (aged 81); Merritt Island, Florida, U.S.
- Burial place: Arlington National Cemetery
- Military career
- Allegiance: United States
- Branch: United States Coast Guard
- Service years: 1928–1966
- Rank: Vice admiral
- Commands: Vice Commandant of the United States Coast Guard

William Davis Shields (August 19, 1907 – March 28, 1989) was a Vice Admiral in the United States Coast Guard who served as the 9th Vice Commandant from 1964 to 1966.
