= Clyde T. Lusk =

United States Coast Guard vice admiral

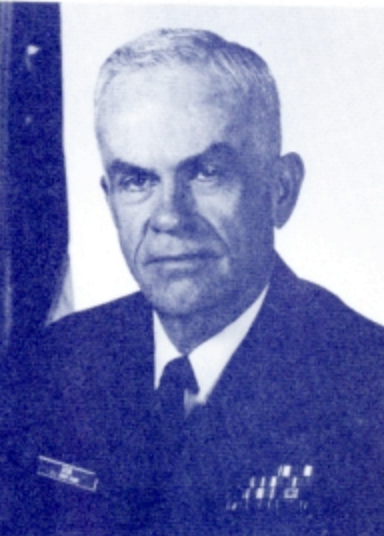
- Born: December 20, 1932; Medford, Massachusetts, U.S.
- Died: October 23, 2014 (aged 81); Asheville, North Carolina, U.S.
- Military career
- Allegiance: United States
- Branch: United States Coast Guard
- Service years: 1955–1990
- Rank: Vice admiral
- Commands: Vice Commandant of the United States Coast Guard

Clyde Thomas Lusk Jr. (December 20, 1932 – October 23, 2014) was a vice admiral in the United States Coast Guard who served as Vice Commandant from 1988 to 1990. He had been commander of the Commander of the Eighth Coast Guard District, Chief of Operations of the Eighth Coast Guard District, Commanding Officer of the Merchant Marine Inspection Office, and Chief of the Office of Merchant Marine Safety at Coast Guard Headquarters. He is an alumnus of the United States Coast Guard Academy (1954) and Industrial College of the Armed Forces.

His awards include the Distinguished Service Medal, two Legion of Merit Medals, and two Meritorious Service Medals. the Secretary's Award for Service Silver Medal, the Coast Guard Commendation Medal and the Coast Guard Achievement Medal. Lusk was born in Medford, Massachusetts and has six children with his wife, Beverly J. Tasko, who is from Wethersfield, Connecticut. On October 23, 2014, Lusk died at the age of 81 of natural causes.

Military offices
Preceded by James C. Irwin	Vice Commandant of the United States Coast Guard; 1988–1990	Succeeded by Martin H. Daniell
