= Thomas G. Allan Jr. =

U.S. Coast Guard flag officer

- Official portrait, 2026
- Born: 12 October 1965 (age 61); Bowie, Maryland, U.S.
- Military career
- Allegiance: United States
- Branch: United States Coast Guard
- Rank: Admiral
- Commands: Vice Commandant of the Coast Guard; Coast Guard First District; Coast Guard Sector Jacksonville
- Awards: Legion of Merit (3)

Thomas George Allan Jr. (born 12 October 1965) is a United States Coast Guard admiral who has served as the 35th vice commandant of the Coast Guard since 27 February 2026. He previously served as the acting vice commandant of the Coast Guard, in place of Admiral Kevin Lunday, from 3 July 2025 to 26 February 2026. Prior to that, he served as the deputy commandant for mission support from 2024 to 2025. He previously served as director of operations of the United States Southern Command from 2022 to 2024, and as commander of Coast Guard First District from 2020 to 2022.

In January 2024, Allan was nominated by the president for promotion to vice admiral and assignment as deputy commandant for mission support. In October 2025, Allan was nominated by the president for promotion to admiral, and to be permanently assigned as the vice commandant. He was confirmed by the Senate on 5 February 2026, and assumed the office on 27 February 2026.

Military offices
Preceded by Andrew Tiongson	Commander of the Coast Guard First District; 2020–2022	Succeeded by John W. Mauger
Preceded by Andrew Tiongson	Director of Operations of the United States Southern Command; 2022–2024	Succeeded by Brendan C. McPherson
Preceded by Paul F. Thomas	Deputy Commandant for Mission Support of the United States Coast Guard; 2024–2025	Succeeded by Michael H. Day; Acting
Preceded by Peter W. Gautier	Deputy Commandant for Operations of the United States Coast Guard; Acting; 2025	Succeeded by Shannon N. Gilreath; Acting
Preceded by Peter W. Gautier	Vice Commandant of the Coast Guard; Acting; 2025–2026	Succeeded by Himself
Preceded by Peter W. Gautier	Vice Commandant of the Coast Guard; 2026–present	Incumbent
