= James C. Irwin =

American vice admiral (1929–2018)

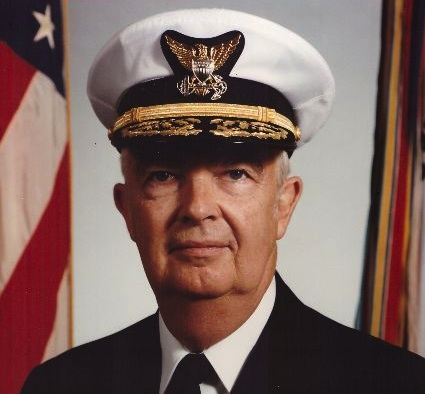
- Born: James Clarence Irwin; June 7, 1929; Des Moines, Iowa, U.S.
- Died: March 21, 2018 (aged 88); Chandler, Arizona, U.S.
- Burial place: National Memorial Cemetery of Arizona
- Military career
- Allegiance: United States
- Branch: United States Coast Guard
- Service years: 42 years
- Rank: Vice admiral
- Commands: Vice Commandant of the United States Coast Guard

James Clarence Irwin (June 7, 1929 – March 21, 2018) was a vice admiral in the United States Coast Guard who served as Vice Commandant from 1986 to 1988. He had been commander of the 5th Coast Guard District and Chief of the Office of Reserve at Headquarters, Coast Guard. After his term as vice commandant, he served as Commander, Joint Task Force FOUR (a predecessor agency to Joint Interagency Task Force South) and Coast Guard Atlantic Area (appointed 1989) and U.S. Maritime Defense Zone Atlantic (from 1988 to 1989).

== Personal life ==
Irwin was born in Des Moines, Iowa, and was married to La Verne Marie Grapski.

Military offices
Preceded by Benedict L. Stabile	Vice Commandant of the United States Coast Guard; 1986–1988	Succeeded by Clyde T. Lusk
