= Coast Guard Pacific Area =

Area command of the United States Coast Guard

Coast Guard Pacific Area & Defense Forces West
- Country: United States
- Type: Area Command
- Headquarters: Coast Guard Island, Alameda, California
- Nickname(s): PACAREA

Commanders
- Area Commander: Rear Admiral Joseph R. Buzzella (acting)
- Deputy Area Commander: Rear Admiral (lower half) Jeffrey W. Novak
- Notable commanders: Admiral Paul F. Zukunft, 25th USCG Commandant; Admiral Linda L. Fagan, 27th & 1st female Commandant

Coast Guard Pacific Area & Defense Forces West (PACAREA) is an Area Command of the United States Coast Guard, a regional command element and force provider tasked with maritime safety, security, and stewardship throughout the Pacific. The command's area of responsibility encompasses six of the seven continents, 71 countries, and more than 74 million square miles of ocean—from the U.S. Western States to the waters off the east coast of Africa, and from the Arctic to Antarctica. Pacific Area has primary responsibilities for all Coast Guard operations throughout this area of responsibility.

== Organizational structure ==
Commander, U.S. Coast Guard Pacific Area is concurrently Commander of Defense Forces West, and is located at Coast Guard Island in Alameda, California.

Pacific Area is divided into four operational regions called districts, each overseen by a two-star Rear Admiral. The 11th Coast Guard District is co-located with Pacific Area and oversees all Coast Guard operations from the California/Oregon border, south to Guatemala and out 200 miles to sea. The 13th Coast Guard District is headquartered in Seattle, Washington and maintains responsibility for Coast Guard operations throughout the Pacific Northwest. The 17th Coast Guard District is based in Juneau, with responsibility for all Coast Guard operations in Alaska. The 14th Coast Guard District has responsibility for Coast Guard operations throughout a 12.2 million square mile region that encompasses the Hawaiian Islands, Guam, American Samoa, and Coast Guard activities in Saipan, Singapore, and Japan.

The Pacific Area and its subordinate units employ 13,000 active duty and reserve members, Coast Guard Auxiliarists, and civilian employees.

== Operational assets ==
In addition to assets at each of its subordinate units, the Pacific Area command's operational assets include:

- 6 National Security Cutters
- 8 High Endurance Cutters
- 4 Medium Endurance Cutters
- 3 Polar Ice Breakers
- 29 Patrol Boats
- 12 Buoy Tenders
- 11 Sectors
- 10 Air Stations
- 13 HC-130 Fixed-Wing Aircraft
- 26 HH-65 Dolphin Helicopters
- 13 HH-60 Jayhawk Helicopters

Pacific Area also oversees the Deployable Specialized Forces (DSFs), which include the National Strike Force, Tactical Law Enforcement Teams, Port Security Units, and Maritime Safety and Security Teams.

== List of commanders ==
- Thomas H. Collins, 1998
- Charles E. Larkin, 2000
- Harvey E. Johnson Jr., June 2004
- Charles D. Wurster, May 2006
- David Pekoske, 29 May 2008
- Jody A. Breckenridge, 10 July 2009
- Manson K. Brown, 18 May 2010
- Paul F. Zukunft, 27 April 2012
- Charles W. Ray, 22 April 2014
- Fred M. Midgette, 15 August 2016
- Linda L. Fagan, 8 June 2018
- Peter W. Gautier, 16 June 2021 (acting)
- Michael F. McAllister, 30 June 2021
- Andrew J. Tiongson, 8 July 2022
- Joseph R. Buzzella (acting), 18 July 2025

== See also ==
- United States Coast Guard
