= Paul E. Trimble =

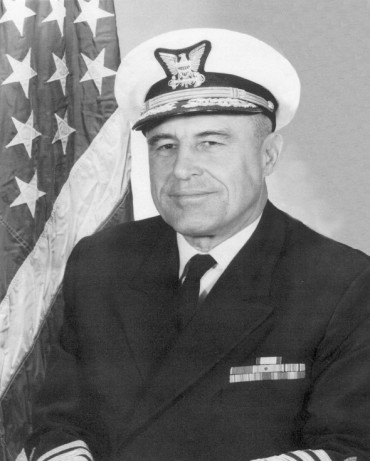
- Born: March 24, 1913; Agenda, Kansas, U.S.
- Died: November 16, 2005 (aged 92); Palm Harbor, Florida, U.S.
- Military career
- Allegiance: United States
- Branch: United States Coast Guard
- Service years: 1936–1970
- Rank: Vice admiral
- Commands: Vice Commandant of the United States Coast Guard; Coast Guard Base Boston; USCGC Duane; USCGC Storis; USS Sausalito; USS Hoquiam
- Conflicts: World War II
- Awards: Distinguished Service Medal (2); Legion of Merit

Paul Edwin Trimble (March 24, 1913 – November 16, 2005) was a Vice Admiral in the United States Coast Guard who served as the 10th Vice Commandant from 1966 to 1970. He was born in Agenda, Kansas and was raised in Milaca, Minnesota.

Trimble earned a B.S. degree from the United States Coast Guard Academy in June 1936 and later received an M.B.A. with Distinction from the Harvard Business School in June 1942.
