= Kevin Lunday =

U.S. Coast Guard admiral (born 1965)

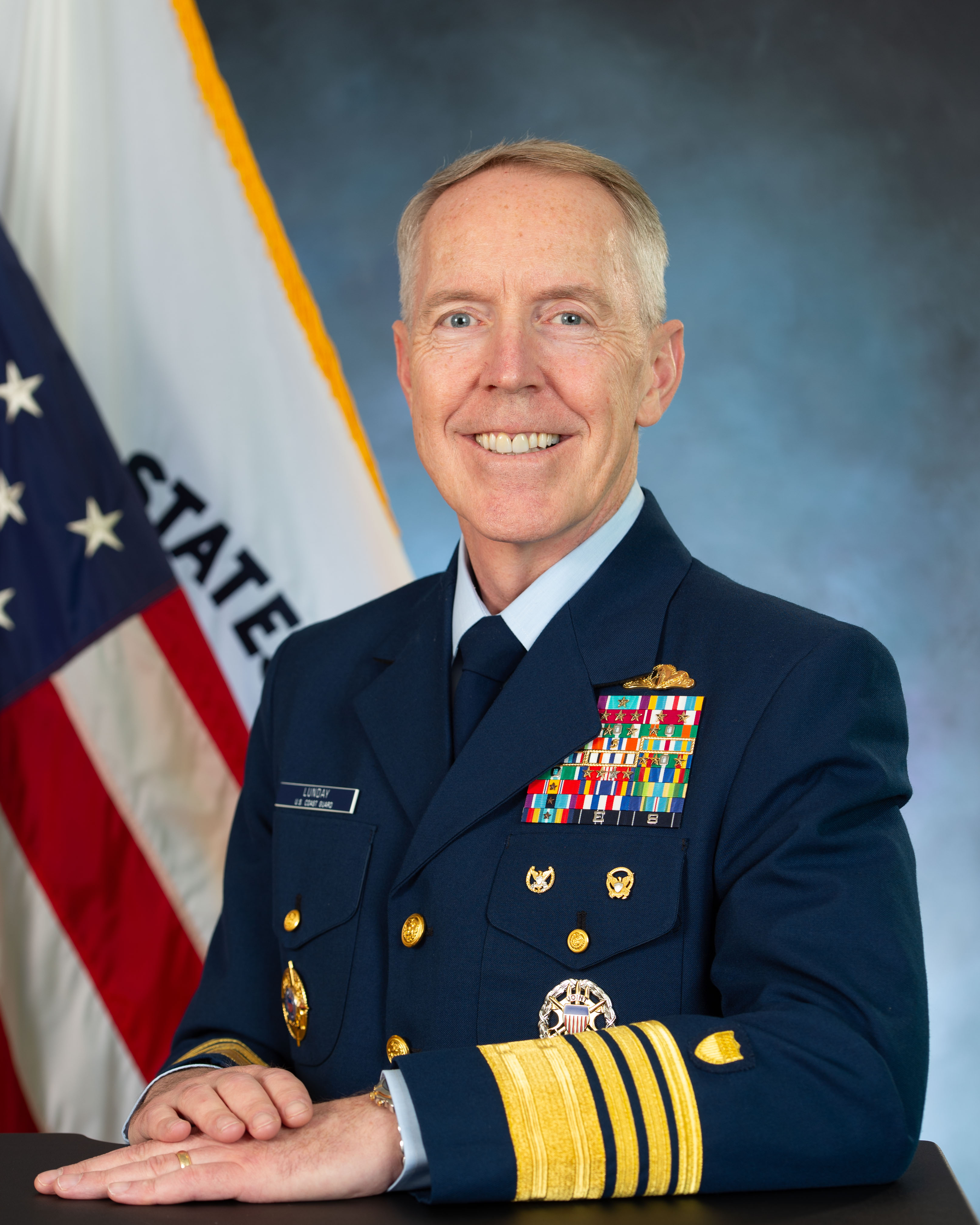
- Official portrait

28th Commandant of the Coast Guard
- Incumbent
- Assumed office January 15, 2026; Acting: January 21, 2025 – January 15, 2026
- President: Donald Trump
- Preceded by: Linda L. Fagan

34th Vice Commandant of the Coast Guard
- In office 13 June 2024 – 3 July 2025
- President: Joe Biden; Donald Trump
- Preceded by: Steven D. Poulin
- Succeeded by: Thomas G. Allan Jr.

Personal details
- Born: Kevin Eugene Lunday; October 12, 1965 (age 61) Columbia, South Carolina, U.S.
- Education: United States Coast Guard Academy (BS); George Washington University (JD); National Defense University (MS)

Military service
- Allegiance: United States
- Branch: United States Coast Guard
- Years of service: 1987–present
- Rank: Admiral
- Commands: Commandant of the Coast Guard; Coast Guard Atlantic Area; Coast Guard Fourteenth District; Coast Guard Cyber Command; Coast Guard Maritime Intelligence Fusion Center Atlantic; USCG Point Martin (WPB-82379)
- Awards: Coast Guard Distinguished Service Medal; Defense Superior Service Medal; Legion of Merit (2)

Kevin Eugene Lunday (born October 12, 1965) is a United States Coast Guard admiral who has served as the 28th commandant of the Coast Guard since 15 January 2026 and as the acting commandant from 21 January 2025 to 15 January 2026. He previously served as the 34th Vice Commandant of the Coast Guard from 2024 to 2025 and as commander of the Coast Guard Atlantic Area from 2022 to 2024.

A native of South Carolina, Lunday received his commission from the United States Coast Guard Academy in 1987, where he graduated with a B.S. degree in marine engineering. He holds a Juris Doctor from George Washington University Law School, an M.S. degree in national security strategy from the National War College at National Defense University and is a distinguished graduate of the College of Naval Command and Staff.

== Military career ==
Lunday served as the deputy for materiel readiness to the deputy commandant for mission support of the United States Coast Guard from 2020 to 2022. He also previously commanded the Coast Guard Fourteenth District (Hawaii and Pacific territories) from July 2018 to June 2020, Coast Guard Cyber Command from 2016 to 2018, and served as the director of exercises and training (J7) of United States Cyber Command from 2014 to 2016. In March 2024, Lunday was nominated for promotion to admiral and appointment as vice commandant of the Coast Guard.

In January 2025, Admiral Linda Fagan was relieved as commandant by President Donald Trump, and Lunday assumed her position in an acting capacity. Lunday's Senate confirmation as commandant was temporarily halted due to a controversial policy designating nooses and swastikas from "symbols of hatred" to "potentially divisive". The policy was later rescinded, and Lunday was confirmed as commandant in December 2025. He assumed office as commandant on 15 January 2026.

== Awards and decorations ==
Admiral Lunday earned the Coast Guard Judge Advocate General (CGJAG) Professionals qualification badge as well as both the Command Ashore and Command Afloat badges.

Personal decorations
	Coast Guard Distinguished Service Medal with gold star
	Defense Superior Service Medal
Width-44 crimson ribbon with a pair of width-2 white stripes on the edges	Legion of Merit with three gold stars
Width-44 crimson ribbon with two width-8 white stripes at distance 4 from the edges.	Meritorious Service Medal with two gold stars
	Coast Guard Commendation Medal with three gold stars and operational distinguishing device
	Coast Guard Achievement Medal with gold star and operational distinguishing device
	Commandants Letter of Commendation Ribbon
Unit awards
	Presidential Unit Citation (Coast Guard) with hurricane device
	Joint Meritorious Unit Award
	DHS Outstanding Unit Award Ribbon with Coast Guard Frame
	D.O.T. Outstanding Unit Award
	Coast Guard Unit Commendation Ribbon with O Device and three Gold Stars
	Coast Guard Meritorious Unit Commendation with O Device
	Coast Guard Meritorious Team Commendation with Silver Star and three Gold Stars
	Coast Guard Bicentennial Unit Commendation Ribbon
Campaign and service medals
Width=44 scarlet ribbon with a central width-4 golden yellow stripe, flanked by pairs of width-1 scarlet, white, Old Glory blue, and white stripes	National Defense Service Medal with one bronze campaign star
	Global War on Terrorism Service Medal
	Armed Forces Service Medal
	Humanitarian Service Medal Ribbon with Bronze Star
Service, training and marksman awards
	D.O.T. 9-11 Ribbon Coast Guard
	Coast Guard Special Operations Service Ribbon
	Coast Guard Sea Service Ribbon with Bronze Star
	Coast Guard Rifle Marksmanship Ribbon with Expert E
	Coast Guard Pistol Marksmanship Ribbon with Sharpshooter S

Military offices
Preceded by ???	Commander of the Coast Guard Cyber Command; 2016–2018	Succeeded by David M. Dermanelian
Preceded by Brian K. Penoyer	Commander of the Coast Guard Fourteenth District; 2018–2020	Succeeded by Matthew W. Sibley
Preceded by Joseph M. Vojvodich	Deputy for Materiel Readiness to the Deputy Commandant for Mission Support of the United States Coast Guard; 2020–2022	Succeeded by Albert Curry Jr.
Preceded by Steven D. Poulin	Director of the Homeland Security Joint Task Force – East and Commander of the Coast Guard Atlantic Area; 2022–2024	Succeeded by Nathan A. Moore
Preceded by Steven D. Poulin	Vice Commandant of the Coast Guard; 2024–2026	Succeeded by Thomas G. Allan Jr.
Preceded by Linda L. Fagan	Commandant of the Coast Guard; 2025–present Acting: 2025–2026	Incumbent
