= Ellis L. Perry =

American vice admiral and Coast Guard officer

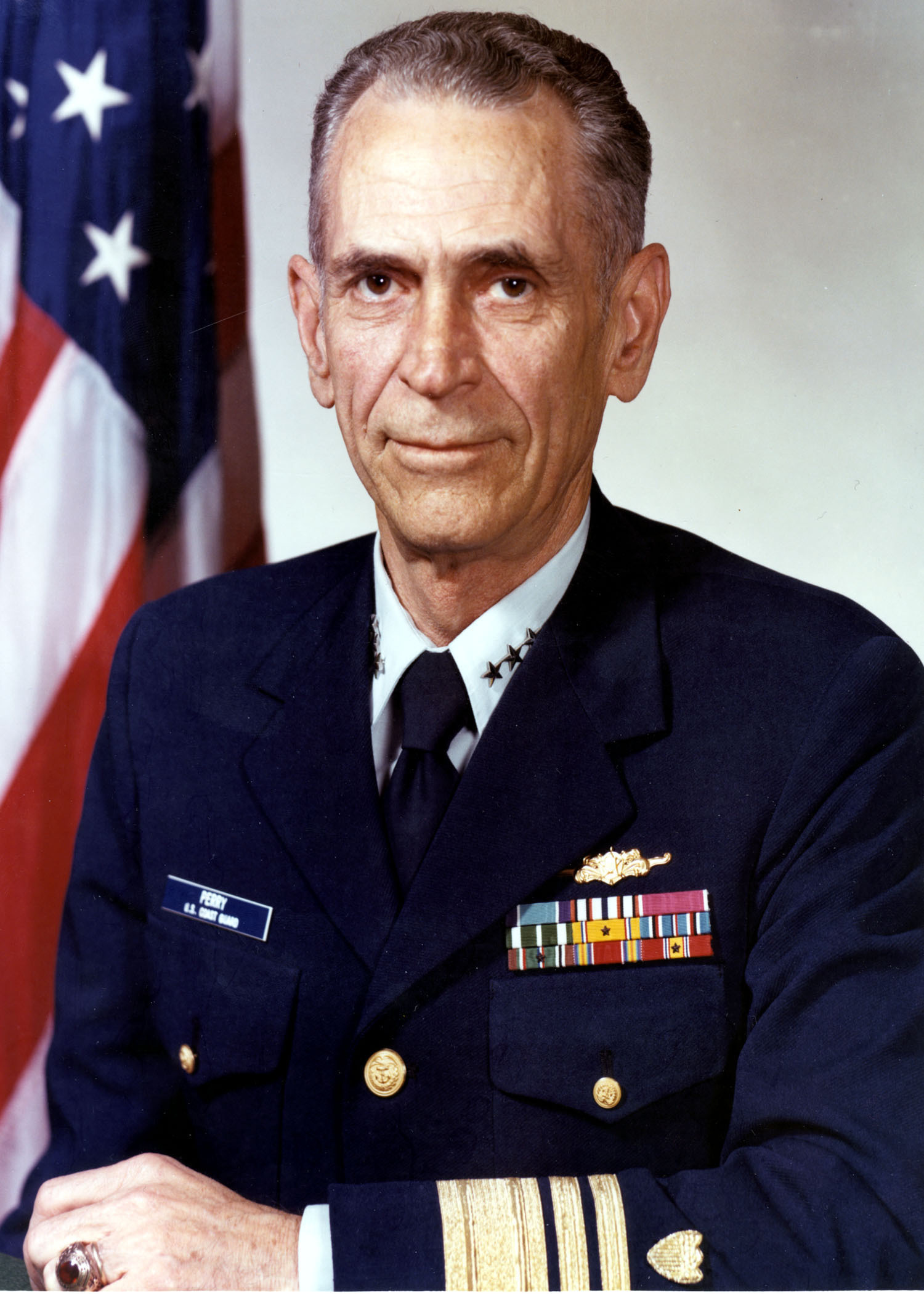
- Born: September 29, 1919; Lawrenceburg, Tennessee, U.S.
- Died: March 2, 2002 (aged 82); Lawrenceburg, Tennessee, U.S.
- Military career
- Allegiance: United States
- Branch: United States Coast Guard
- Service years: 1941–1978
- Rank: Vice admiral
- Commands: Vice Commandant of the United States Coast Guard

Ellis L. Perry (September 29, 1919 – March 2, 2002) was a vice admiral and Vice Commandant of the United States Coast Guard.

== Biography ==
Perry was born on September 29, 1919, in Lawrenceburg, Tennessee. He graduated from the Massachusetts Institute of Technology in 1946. In 2002, he died in Lawrenceburg, Tennessee, at the age of 82.

== Career ==
Perry graduated from the United States Coast Guard Academy in 1941. During World War II, he served aboard the USCGC Bibb (WPG-31) and the USS Wakefield (AP-21).

After the war, he was assigned to the USCGC Pontchartrain (WHEC-70) and the USCGC Mendota (WHEC-69). Later, he served as Shipbuilding and Repair Superintendent of the United States Coast Guard Yard.

Following assignments that included commanding the USCGC Bering Strait (WAVP-382), Perry headed the Department of Applied Sciences and Engineering at the Coast Guard Academy. In 1969, he returned to the Coast Guard Yard as Commanding Officer.

Perry became Chief of Personnel of the Coast Guard in 1970 and Chief of Staff of the Coast Guard in 1971. He would go on to serve as Vice Commandant from 1974 to 1978.

Awards he received during his career include the Coast Guard Distinguished Service Medal, the Legion of Merit, the Coast Guard Commendation Medal, the National Defense Service Medal, the American Defense Service Medal, the American Campaign Medal, the European-African-Middle Eastern Campaign Medal and the World War II Victory Medal.

Military offices
Preceded by Thomas R. Sargent III	Vice Commandant of the United States Coast Guard; 1974–1978	Succeeded by Robert H. Scarborough
