= Vice Commandant of the Coast Guard =

Second-in-command of the United States Coast Guard

- Seal of the Coast Guard

- Flag of the vice commandant

- Incumbent; Admiral Thomas G. Allan Jr. since 27 February 2026
- United States Coast Guard
- Type: Service vice chief
- Reports to: Commandant of the Coast Guard
- Seat: Douglas A. Munro Coast Guard Headquarters Building, Washington, D.C.
- Appointer: The president; with Senate advice and consent
- Constituting instrument: 14 U.S.C. § 304
- Formation: 1929
- First holder: Benjamin M. Chiswell
- Website: www.uscg.mil

The vice commandant of the Coast Guard serves as the second-in-command of the United States Coast Guard, behind only the commandant of the Coast Guard.

Since 1929, 35 officers have served as vice commandant, or, as the position was referred to before 1972, assistant commandant. The title of the position was changed effective October 2, 1972, pursuant to Pub. L. 92–451. This position has been historically held by a vice admiral until the Coast Guard Authorization Act of 2015 elevated the statutory rank for the position to admiral.

The 35th and current vice commandant is Admiral Thomas G. Allan Jr, since 27 February 2026. Allan also served as the acting vice commandant from 3 July 2025 to 26 February 2026.

== Vice commandants of the Coast Guard ==
No.	Name	Photo	Tenure
1	Captain; Benjamin M. Chiswell		1929–1931
2	Rear Admiral; Leon C. Covell		1931–1941
3	Rear Admiral; Lloyd T. Chalker		1941–1946
4	Vice Admiral; Merlin O'Neill		1946–1949
5	Rear Admiral; Alfred C. Richmond		1949–1954
6	Vice Admiral; James Hirshfield		1954–1962
7	Vice Admiral; Edwin J. Roland		1962–1962
8	Vice Admiral; Donald M. Morrison		1962–1964
9	Vice Admiral; William D. Shields		1964–1966
10	Vice Admiral; Paul E. Trimble		1966–1970
11	Vice Admiral; Thomas R. Sargent III		1970–1974
12	Vice Admiral; Ellis L. Perry		1974–1978
13	Vice Admiral; Robert H. Scarborough		1978–1982
14	Vice Admiral; Benedict L. Stabile		1982–1986
15	Vice Admiral; James C. Irwin		1986–1988
16	Vice Admiral; Clyde T. Lusk		1988–1990
17	Vice Admiral; Martin H. Daniell		1990–1992
18	Vice Admiral; Robert T. Nelson		1992–1994
19	Vice Admiral; Arthur E. Henn		1994–1996
20	Vice Admiral; Richard D. Herr		1996–1998
21	Vice Admiral; James C. Card		1998–2000
22	Vice Admiral; Thomas H. Collins		2000–2002
23	Vice Admiral; Thomas J. Barrett		2002–2004
24	Vice Admiral; Terry M. Cross		2004–2006
25	Vice Admiral; Vivien Crea		2006–2009
26	Vice Admiral; David Pekoske		2009–2010
27	Vice Admiral; Sally Brice-O'Hara		2010–2012
28	Vice Admiral; John Currier		2012–2014
29	Vice Admiral; Peter Neffenger		2014–2015
30	Admiral; Charles D. Michel		2015–2018
31	Admiral; Charles W. Ray		2018–2021
32	Admiral; Linda L. Fagan		2021–2022
33	Admiral; Steven D. Poulin		2022–2024
34	Admiral; Kevin E. Lunday		2024–2025
-	Vice Admiral; Thomas G. Allan Jr. Acting		2025–2026
35	Admiral; Thomas G. Allan Jr.		2026–present

== See also ==
- Commandant of the Coast Guard
- Master Chief Petty Officer of the Coast Guard
- Vice Chief of Staff of the Army
- Assistant Commandant of the Marine Corps
- Vice Chief of Naval Operations
- Vice Chief of Staff of the Air Force
- Vice Chief of Space Operations
