= Andrew Tiongson =

U.S. Coast Guard admiral

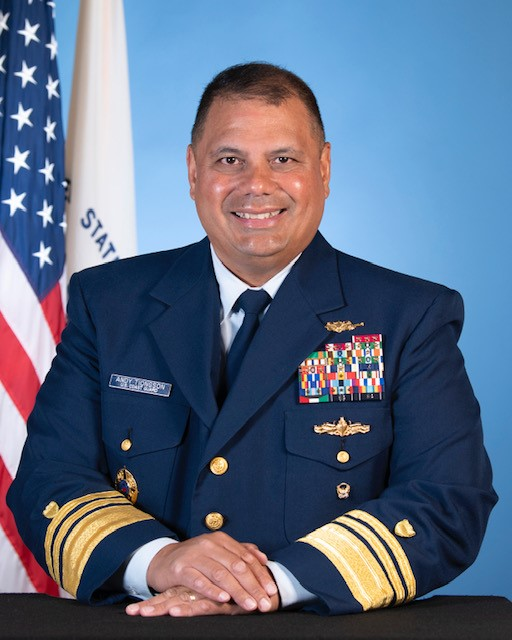
- Official portrait, 2022
- Born: 15 June 1967 (age 59); Chelsea, Maine, U.S.
- Education: United States Coast Guard Academy (BS); George Washington University (MS); Massachusetts Institute of Technology (MS)
- Military career
- Allegiance: United States
- Branch: United States Coast Guard
- Service years: 1989–2025
- Rank: Vice Admiral
- Commands: Coast Guard Pacific Area; Coast Guard First District; USCGC James (WMSL-754); USCGC Legare (WMEC-912)
- Awards: Defense Superior Service Medal; Legion of Merit (4)

Andrew Joseph Tiongson (born 15 June 1967) is a retired United States Coast Guard vice admiral who last served concurrently as Commander, Pacific Area and Commander, Defense Force West from 2022 to 2025. He most recently served as the Director of Operations (J3) at the United States Southern Command and was previously Commander of the Coast Guard First District. In his first flag assignment, he served as the Coast Guard's Chief Financial Officer and Assistant Commandant for Resources .

He was promoted to the rank of vice admiral on 11 June 2022.

Military offices
| Preceded by Todd A. Sokalzuk | Assistant Commandant for Resources and Chief Financial Officer of the United States Coast Guard; 2016–2018 | Succeeded by Thomas G. Allan Jr. |
| Preceded by Steven D. Poulin | Commander of the Coast Guard First District; 2018–2020 | Succeeded by Thomas G. Allan Jr. |
| Preceded by Steven D. Poulin | Director of Operations of the United States Southern Command; 2020–2022 | Succeeded by Thomas G. Allan Jr. |
| Preceded by Michael F. McAllister | Commander of the Coast Guard Pacific Area and Defense Force West; 2022–2025 | Succeeded by Joseph R. Buzzella; Acting |
