= Linda L. Fagan =

US Coast Guard admiral (born 1963)

Linda Fagan
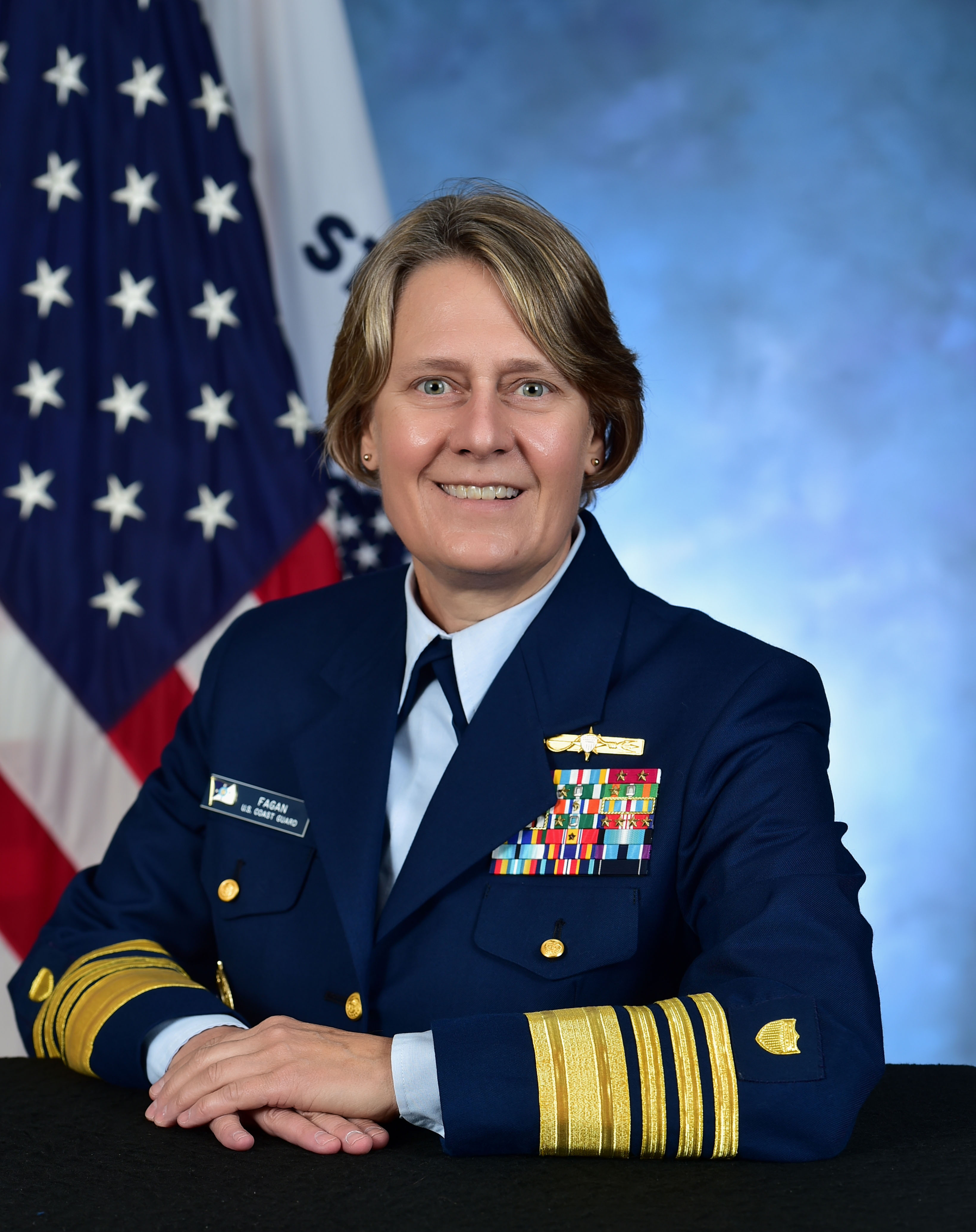
- Official portrait, 2021

27th Commandant of the Coast Guard
- In office June 1, 2022 – January 21, 2025
- President: Joe Biden; Donald Trump
- Vice Commandant: Steven D. Poulin; Kevin Lunday
- Preceded by: Karl L. Schultz
- Succeeded by: Kevin E. Lunday

32nd Vice Commandant of the Coast Guard
- In office June 18, 2021 – May 31, 2022
- Commandant: Karl L. Schultz
- Preceded by: Charles W. Ray
- Succeeded by: Steven D. Poulin

Personal details
- Born: Linda Lee Keene; July 1, 1963 (age 62) Columbus, Ohio, U.S.
- Education: United States Coast Guard Academy (BS); University of Washington (MS); National Defense University (MS)

Military service
- Allegiance: United States
- Branch/service: United States Coast Guard
- Years of service: 1985–2025
- Rank: Admiral
- Commands: Commandant of the Coast Guard; Coast Guard Pacific Area; First Coast Guard District; Coast Guard Sector New York
- Awards: Coast Guard Distinguished Service Medal; Defense Superior Service Medal; Legion of Merit (3)
- Linda L. Fagan's voice Fagan outlines her vision for the Coast Guard at a House Homeland Security subcommittee hearing Recorded July 14, 2022

Linda Lee Fagan (born July 1, 1963) is a retired American admiral who served as the 27th commandant of the United States Coast Guard from June 2022 to January 2025. Previously, she was the 32nd vice commandant of the Coast Guard under Commandant Karl L. Schultz from 2021 to 2022. Before that, she was the commander of the Coast Guard Pacific Area with prior terms as Coast Guard Deputy for Operations, Policy, and Capabilities; commander, First Coast Guard District; and commander, Coast Guard Sector New York. Fagan is also the Coast Guard's first Gold Ancient Trident, the officer with the longest service record in the marine safety field. In April 2021, Secretary of Homeland Security Alejandro Mayorkas announced her nomination as the next Coast Guard vice commandant, succeeding Charles W. Ray. She was confirmed on June 17, 2021, and assumed office on June 18.

In April 2022, it was announced that Fagan would be nominated to succeed Schultz as Commandant, making her the first woman in American history to lead a military service. Her nomination was sent to the Senate on April 7, 2022, and confirmed by unanimous consent on May 11. She assumed office on June 1.

On January 21, 2025, Fagan was relieved of command upon the inauguration of President Donald Trump, making her also the first commandant to be fired.

== Early life and education ==
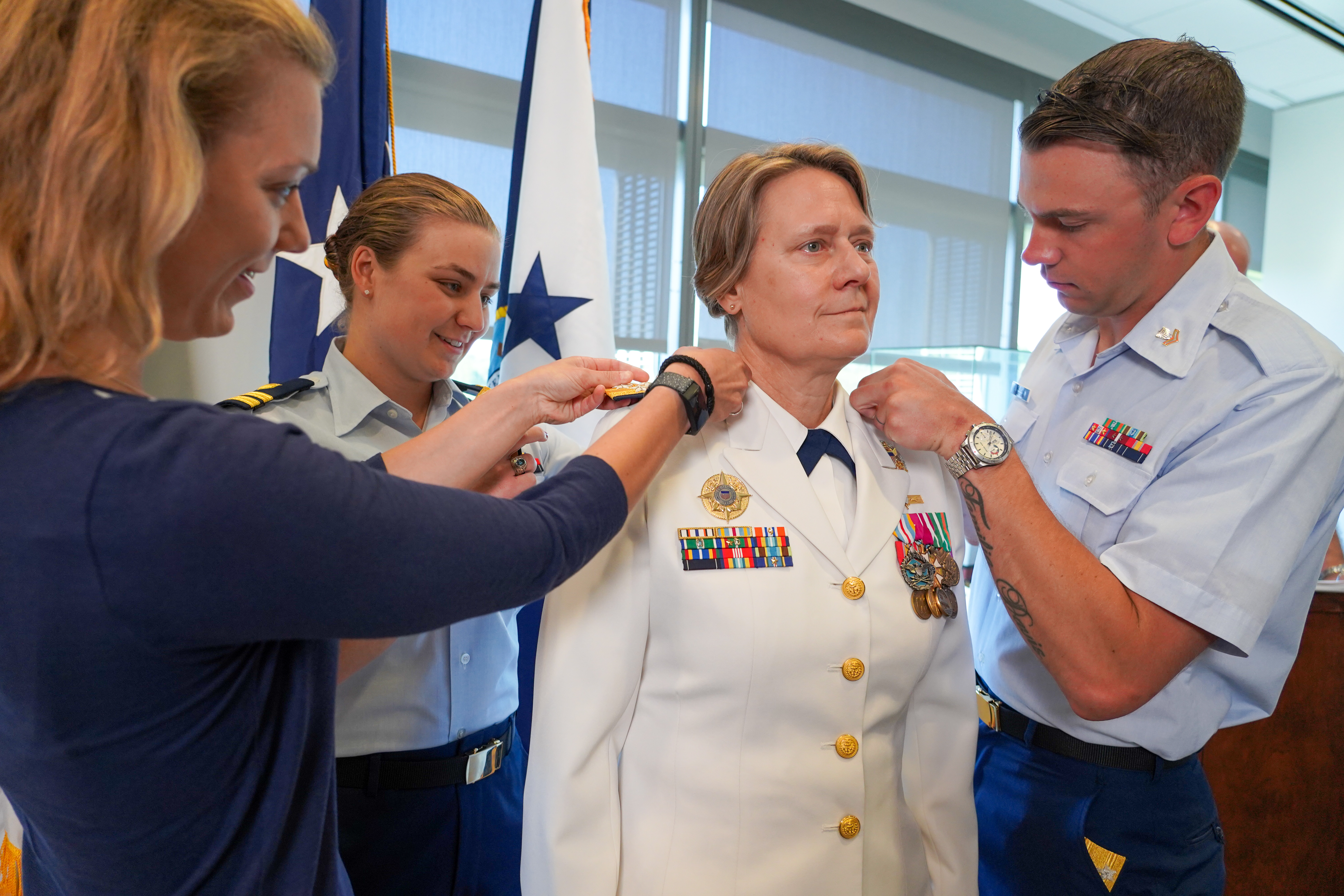
Fagan is promoted to the rank of admiral during a ceremony at Coast Guard Headquarters, June 18, 2021

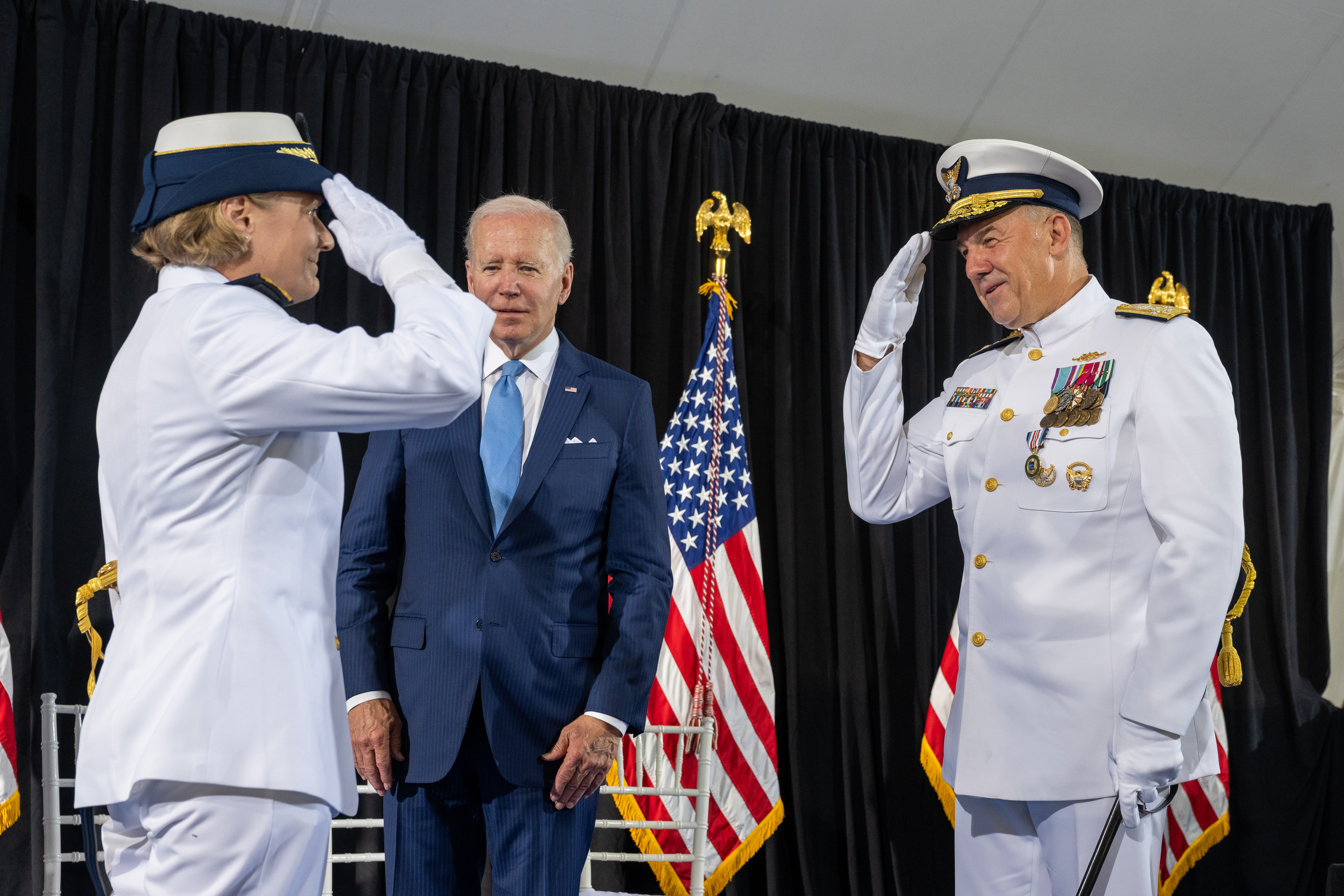
Fagan assumes command of the Coast Guard from outgoing commandant Karl L. Schultz on June 1, 2022

Born in Columbus, Ohio, Fagan graduated from the Coast Guard Academy in 1985 with a bachelor's degree in marine science. She later earned a master of marine affairs degree from the University of Washington in 2000 and a master's in national security strategy from the Industrial College of the Armed Forces at the National Defense University in 2008.

== Career ==
=== Handling of sexual assault investigations ===
More than a year after Fagan became Commandant, in mid-2023, news broke that Coast Guard officials had conducted an investigation from 2014 to 2018 of rape and sexual assault at the Coast Guard Academy, but had not briefed Congress about their investigation when it concluded. Fagan apologized to the victims of the sexual assaults and pledged to be more transparent about the agency's problems. After listening to four women describe being sexually assaulted while Academy cadets, members of the Senate Permanent Subcommittee on Investigations probing a "culture of cover-up" vowed to hold past and current Coast Guard leadership accountable. "We're going to pursue those two individuals and others," said Connecticut Senator Richard Blumenthal, Chairman of the Subcommittee, referring to retired Admiral Karl L. Schultz, the former commandant of the Coast Guard, and his successor Fagan. On December 19, 2023, the Subcommittee stated in a press release and a letter to Fagan, "It is clear from this testimony, and the Subcommittee's inquiry to date, that the Coast Guard's culture of cover-up has allowed sexual assault and sexual harassment to persist for decades, both at the Academy and in the Coast Guard. It is equally apparent that accountability and systematic change at both the Coast Guard and the Academy are necessary to address past failures and to ensure that future cadets are protected." The Subcommittee demanded a "swift response" to the inquiry and further indicated that "[s]hould the Coast Guard continue to withhold or redact requested records, PSI will have no choice but to utilize other means to ensure compliance with congressional oversight."

=== Relieved of command ===
She was relieved of command on January 21, 2025, by acting Homeland Security Secretary Benjamine Huffman. Fagan had two years remaining in her appointed four-year term. A statement by an unnamed Homeland Security senior official, first reported by Fox News and later other news agencies, proposed that the relief was due to "failure to address border security threats, insufficient leadership in recruitment and retention, mismanagement in acquiring key acquisitions such as icebreakers and helicopters, excessive focus on diversity, equity and inclusion (DEI) initiatives and an 'erosion of trust' over the mishandling and cover-up of Operation Fouled Anchor."

This firing exists in the larger context of the second Trump administration's vow to eliminate DEI programs in federal government agencies. Congressman Rick Larsen denounced the decision, claiming it was misguided, reckless, and would harm Coast Guard readiness. Senator Maria Cantwell also opposed the removal, claiming the coverup of Operation Fouled Anchor happened before Fagan took command, and that "firing a commandant at will by a new president also sets a bad precedent. The complexity of the Coast Guard's diverse missions requires continuity to protect lives and American interests." Fagan learned of her dismissal at the Commander-in-Chief Ball on Inauguration Day, while waiting in line to have her picture taken with the new president. According to media reports, she was evicted from her residence on February 4 with three hours' notice.

== Awards and decorations ==
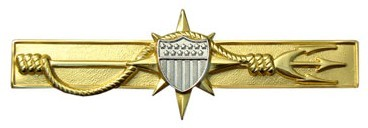

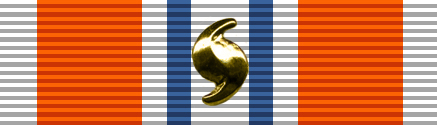

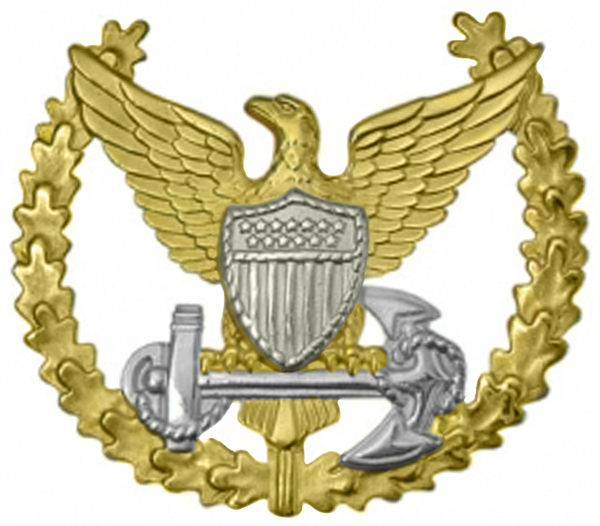

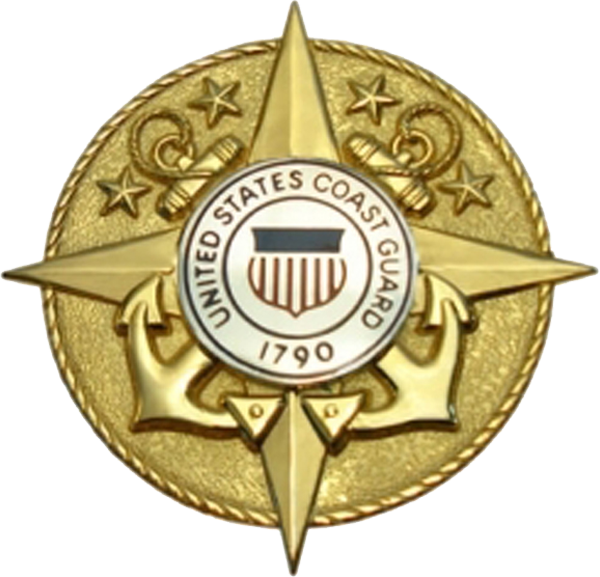

| Badge | Marine Safety Insignia | | |
| 1st row | Coast Guard Distinguished Service Medal | | |
| 2nd row | Defense Superior Service Medal | Legion of Merit with two gold award stars | Meritorious Service Medal |
| 3rd row | Coast Guard Commendation Medal with "O" device and award star | Coast Guard Achievement Medal with "O" device and award star | Commandant's Letter of Commendation Ribbon with "O" device |
| 4th row | Coast Guard Presidential Unit Citation with "hurricane symbol" | Joint Meritorious Unit Award | DHS Outstanding Unit Award |
| 5th row | Secretary of Transportation Outstanding Unit Award | Coast Guard Meritorious Unit Commendation with "O" device and award star | Meritorious Team Commendation with four award stars |
| 6th row | Coast Guard Bicentennial Unit Commendation | National Defense Service Medal with one bronze service star | Antarctica Service Medal |
| 7th row | Coast Guard Arctic Service Medal | Global War on Terrorism Service Medal | Humanitarian Service Medal |
| 8th row | Coast Guard Sea Service Ribbon | Coast Guard Overseas Service Ribbon | Coast Guard Pistol Marksmanship ribbon |
| Badge | Coast Guard Command Ashore insignia | | |
| Badge | Joint Chiefs of Staff ID Badge | | |
| Badge | Commandant Staff Badge | | |

== Personal life and family ==
Fagan is the daughter of Jon Harley Keene and Loann Carol (Morris) Keene. She and her deceased husband, John J. Fagan, have two daughters, one of whom is a Coast Guard Academy graduate.

On June 29, 2024, Fagan was awarded the DAR Patriot Award by the National Society Daughters of the American Revolution at the society's 133rd Continental Congress. She was presented the award by DAR president general Pamela Rouse Wright during National Defense Night ceremony at DAR Constitution Hall in Washington, D.C.

Military offices
| Preceded by Fred Midgette | Commander of the Coast Guard Pacific Area; 2018–2021 | Succeeded by Peter Gautier; Acting |
| Preceded by Charles W. Ray | Vice Commandant of the Coast Guard; 2021–2022 | Succeeded by Steven D. Poulin |
| Preceded by Karl L. Schultz | Commandant of the Coast Guard; 2022–2025 | Succeeded by Kevin E. Lunday; Acting |
