= Richard D. Herr =

United States Coast Guard vice admiral (born 1941)

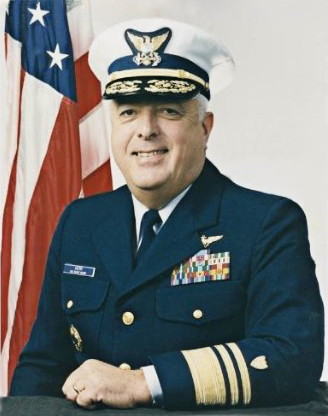
- Born: November 2, 1941 (age 84); Seattle, Washington, U.S.
- Died: 2025
- Military career
- Allegiance: United States
- Branch: United States Coast Guard
- Service years: 1960–1998
- Rank: Vice admiral
- Commands: Vice Commandant of the United States Coast Guard

Richard Dennis Herr (born November 2, 1941) was a retired vice admiral in the United States Coast Guard who served as the 20th Vice Commandant from 1996 to 1998. He was previously Commander of the Coast Guard Pacific Area and U.S. Maritime Defense Zone Pacific, Resource Director, Comptroller, Coast Guard Chief Financial Officer, Commander of the Eleventh Coast Guard District, Commander of Joint Task Force Five, Commander of Coast Guard Air Station and Commander of Coast Guard Aviation Training Center. He was an alumnus of the United States Coast Guard Academy, Naval Postgraduate School, and National War College.

His awards include the Distinguished Service Medal, three Legions of Merit, two Meritorious Service Medals, two Coast Guard Commendation Medals, and the Coast Guard Achievement Medal. He was married to Susan Andrews and has two children. He died on Tuesday, July 1, 2025, in Oviedo, Florida, at the age of 83.

Military offices
Preceded by Arthur E. Henn	Vice Commandant of the United States Coast Guard; 1996–1998	Succeeded by James C. Card
