= List of United States Coast Guard four-star admirals =

Flag of a Coast Guard four-star admiral

The rank of admiral (or full admiral, or four-star admiral) is the highest rank in the United States Coast Guard. It ranks above vice admiral (three-star admiral).

There have been 25 four-star admirals in the history of the U.S. Coast Guard. Of these, 24 achieved that rank while on active duty and one was promoted upon retirement in recognition of combat citations. All were commissioned via the United States Coast Guard Academy or its predecessor, the School of Instruction of the United States Revenue Cutter Service. Prior to the vice commandant of the Coast Guard being elevated to a four-star position in 2016, all four-star admirals in the U.S. Coast Guard held the position of commandant of the Coast Guard.

== List of admirals ==
The following list of four-star admirals is sortable by last name, date of rank, number of years on active duty at four-star rank (Yrs), active-duty positions held while serving at four-star rank, year commissioned and source of commission, and number of years in commission when promoted to four-star rank (YC), and other biographical notes.

| # | Name | Photo | Date of rank | Position | Yrs | Commission | YC | Notes |
|---|---|---|---|---|---|---|---|---|
| 1 | Russell R. Waesche | | 4 Apr 1945 | Commandant of the Coast Guard, 1936–1945. | 1 | 1906 (USRCSSI) | 39 | (1886–1946) |
| 2 | Joseph F. Farley | | 1 Jan 1946 | Commandant of the Coast Guard, 1946–1949. | 4 | 1912 (USRCSSI) | 34 | (1889–1974) |
| 3 | Alfred C. Richmond | | 1 Jun 1960 | Commandant of the Coast Guard, 1960–1962. | 2 | 1924 (USCGA) | 36 | (1902–1984) Served as Commandant of the U.S. Coast Guard from 1954 to 1960 in the rank of vice admiral. |
| 4 | Edwin J. Roland | | 1 Jun 1962 | Commandant of the Coast Guard, 1962–1966. | 4 | 1929 (USCGA) | 33 | (1905–1985) |
| 5 | Willard J. Smith | | 1 Jun 1966 | Commandant of the Coast Guard, 1966–1970. | 4 | 1933 (USCGA) | 33 | (1910–2000) Superintendent, U.S. Coast Guard Academy, 1962–1965; U.S. Assistant Secretary of Transportation for Safety and Consumer Affairs, 1970–1971. |
| 6 | Chester R. Bender | | 1 Jun 1970 | Commandant of the Coast Guard, 1970–1974. | 4 | 1936 (USCGA) | 34 | (1914–1996) Superintendent, U.S. Coast Guard Academy, 1965–1967. |
| 7 | Owen W. Siler | | 1 Jun 1974 | Commandant of the Coast Guard, 1974–1978. | 4 | 1943 (USCGA) | 31 | (1922–2007) |
| 8 | John B. Hayes | | 1 Jun 1978 | Commandant of the Coast Guard, 1978–1982. | 4 | 1946 (USCGA) | 32 | (1924–2001) |
| 9 | James S. Gracey | | 28 May 1982 | Commandant of the Coast Guard, 1982–1986. | 4 | 1949 (USCGA) | 33 | (1927–2020) |
| 10 | Paul A. Yost Jr. | | 30 May 1986 | Commandant of the Coast Guard, 1986–1990. | 4 | 1951 (USCGA) | 35 | (1929–2022) |
| 11 | J. William Kime | | 31 May 1990 | Commandant of the Coast Guard, 1990–1994. | 4 | 1957 (USCGA) | 33 | (1934–2006) |
| 12 | Robert E. Kramek | | 1 Jun 1994 | Commandant of the Coast Guard, 1994–1998. | 4 | 1961 (USCGA) | 33 | (1939–2016) |
| 13 | James M. Loy | | May 1998 | Commandant of the Coast Guard, 1998–2002. | 4 | 1964 (USCGA) | 34 | (1942– ) Administrator, Transportation Security Administration, 2002–2003; U.S. Deputy Secretary of Homeland Security, 2003–2005. |
| 14 | Thomas H. Collins | | 30 May 2002 | Commandant of the Coast Guard, 2002–2006. | 4 | 1968 (USCGA) | 34 | (1946– ) |
| 15 | Thad W. Allen | | 25 May 2006 | Commandant of the Coast Guard, 2006–2010.; National Incident Commander, Deepwater Horizon oil spill, 2010. | 4 | 1971 (USCGA) | 35 | (1949– ) Remained on active duty for 36 days after stepping down as commandant while serving as National Incident Commander, Deepwater Horizon oil spill. |
| 16 | Robert J. Papp | | 25 May 2010 | Commandant of the Coast Guard, 2010–2014. | 4 | 1975 (USCGA) | 35 | (1953– ) U.S. Special Representative for the Arctic, 2014–2017. |
| 17 | Paul F. Zukunft | | 30 May 2014 | Commandant of the Coast Guard, 2014–2018. | 4 | 1977 (USCGA) | 37 | (1955– ) |
| 18 | Charles D. Michel | | 24 May 2016 | Vice Commandant of the Coast Guard, 2015–2018. | 2 | 1985 (USCGA) | 31 | (1963– ) Served as Vice Commandant of the U.S. Coast Guard from 2015 to 2016 in the rank of vice admiral. First career judge advocate officer to achieve four-star rank in any service. |
| 19 | Charles W. Ray | | 24 May 2018 | Vice Commandant of the Coast Guard, 2018–2021. | 3 | 1981 (USCGA) | 37 | (1959– ) |
| 20 | Karl L. Schultz | | 1 Jun 2018 | Commandant of the Coast Guard, 2018–2022. | 4 | 1983 (USCGA) | 35 | (1961– ) |
| 21 | Linda L. Fagan | | 18 Jun 2021 | Vice Commandant of the Coast Guard, 2021–2022.; Commandant of the Coast Guard, 2022–2025. | 4 | 1985 (USCGA) | 36 | (1963– ) Relieved, 2025. First woman to achieve the rank of admiral in the Coast Guard; first woman to lead an armed service. |
| 22 | Steven D. Poulin | | 31 May 2022 | Vice Commandant of the Coast Guard, 2022–2024. | 2 | 1984 (USCGA) | 38 | (1962– ) |
| 23 | Kevin E. Lunday | | 13 Jun 2024 | Vice Commandant of the Coast Guard, 2024–2025.; Commandant of the Coast Guard, 2026–present. | 2 | 1987 (USCGA) | 37 | (1965– ) Served as Acting Commandant of the Coast Guard from 2025 to 2026. |
| 24 | Thomas G. Allan Jr. | | 27 Feb 2026 | Vice Commandant of the Coast Guard, 2026–present. | 0 | 1990 (USCGA) | 36 | (c. 1968– ) Served as Acting Vice Commandant of the Coast Guard from 2025 to 2026. |

=== Tombstone admirals ===
The Act of Congress of March 4, 1925, allowed officers in the Navy, Marine Corps, and Coast Guard to be promoted one grade upon retirement if they had been specially commended for performance of duty in actual combat. Combat citation promotions were colloquially known as "tombstone promotions" because they conferred the prestige of the higher rank but not the additional retirement pay, so their only practical benefit was to allow recipients to engrave a loftier title on their business cards and tombstones. The Act of Congress of February 23, 1942, enabled tombstone promotions to three- and four-star grades. Tombstone promotions were subsequently restricted to citations issued before January 1, 1947, and finally eliminated altogether effective November 1, 1959.

Any admiral who actually served in a grade while on active duty receives precedence on the retired list over any tombstone admiral holding the same retired grade. Tombstone admirals rank among each other according to the dates of their highest active duty grade.

The following list of tombstone admirals is sortable by last name, date of rank as vice admiral, date retired, and year commissioned.

| | Name | Photo | Date of rank (VADM) | Date retired (ADM) | Commission | Notes |
|---|---|---|---|---|---|---|
| 1 | Merlin O'Neill | | 1 Jan 1950 | 1 Jun 1954 | 1921 (USCGA) | (1898–1981) Commandant of the Coast Guard, 1949–1954. |

== Timeline ==
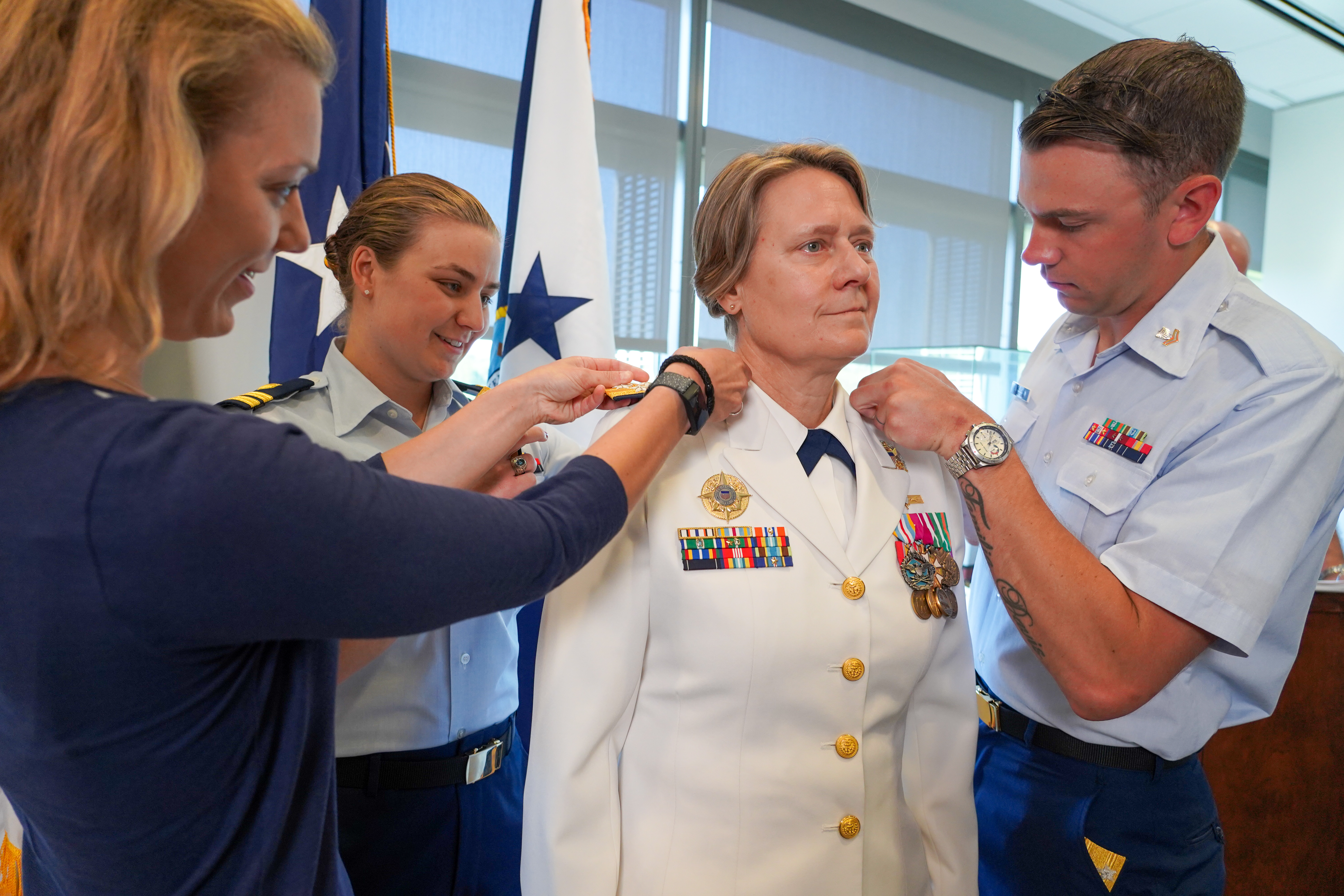
Vice Adm. Linda L. Fagan is promoted to the rank of admiral during a ceremony at Coast Guard Headquarters, June 18, 2021.

The first full admiral in the United States Coast Guard was Russell R. Waesche, who served as commandant from 1936 to 1945 and was promoted to that rank on April 4, 1945. His successor as commandant, John Farley, also inherited the rank of admiral. After Farley retired on December 31, 1949, the commandant's rank was reduced to vice admiral, although Farley's successor, Merlin O'Neill, was promoted to full admiral upon retirement in recognition of combat citations. O'Neill's successor, Alfred C. Richmond, remained a vice admiral until the commandant's rank was again elevated to admiral on June 1, 1960, where it has remained ever since.

== Legislation ==
The following list of Congressional legislation includes major acts of Congress pertaining to appointments to the grade of admiral in the United States Coast Guard.

| Legislation | Citation | Summary |
|---|---|---|
| Act of March 21, 1945 | 59 Stat. 37 | Authorized one grade of admiral, appointed from officers serving now or hereafter as commandant of the Coast Guard, until six months after the end of World War II (Russell R. Waesche, Joseph F. Farley) [made permanent for Waesche in 1946 (60 Stat. 59)]. |
| Act of August 4, 1949 | 63 Stat. 498; 63 Stat. 516; 63 Stat. 558 | Reduced the rank of the commandant of the Coast Guard to vice admiral, without reducing the grade of the current commandant (Joseph F. Farley).; Authorized Coast Guard officers to retire with the rank but not the pay of the next higher grade if specially commended for performance of duty in actual combat on or before December 31, 1946 (Merlin O'Neill) [repealed in 1959 (73 Stat. 337)]. |
| Act of May 14, 1960 | 74 Stat. 144 | Increased the rank of the commandant of the Coast Guard to admiral, effective June 1, 1960. |
| Act of February 8, 2016 | 130 Stat. 33 | Increased the rank of the vice commandant of the Coast Guard to admiral. |

== See also ==
- General (United States)
- List of active duty United States four-star officers
- List of United States Air Force four-star generals
- List of United States Army four-star generals
- List of United States Marine Corps four-star generals
- List of United States Navy four-star admirals
- List of United States military leaders by rank
- List of United States Public Health Service Commissioned Corps four-star admirals
- List of United States Space Force four-star generals
- List of United States Coast Guard vice admirals
