= Legislative history of United States four-star officers =

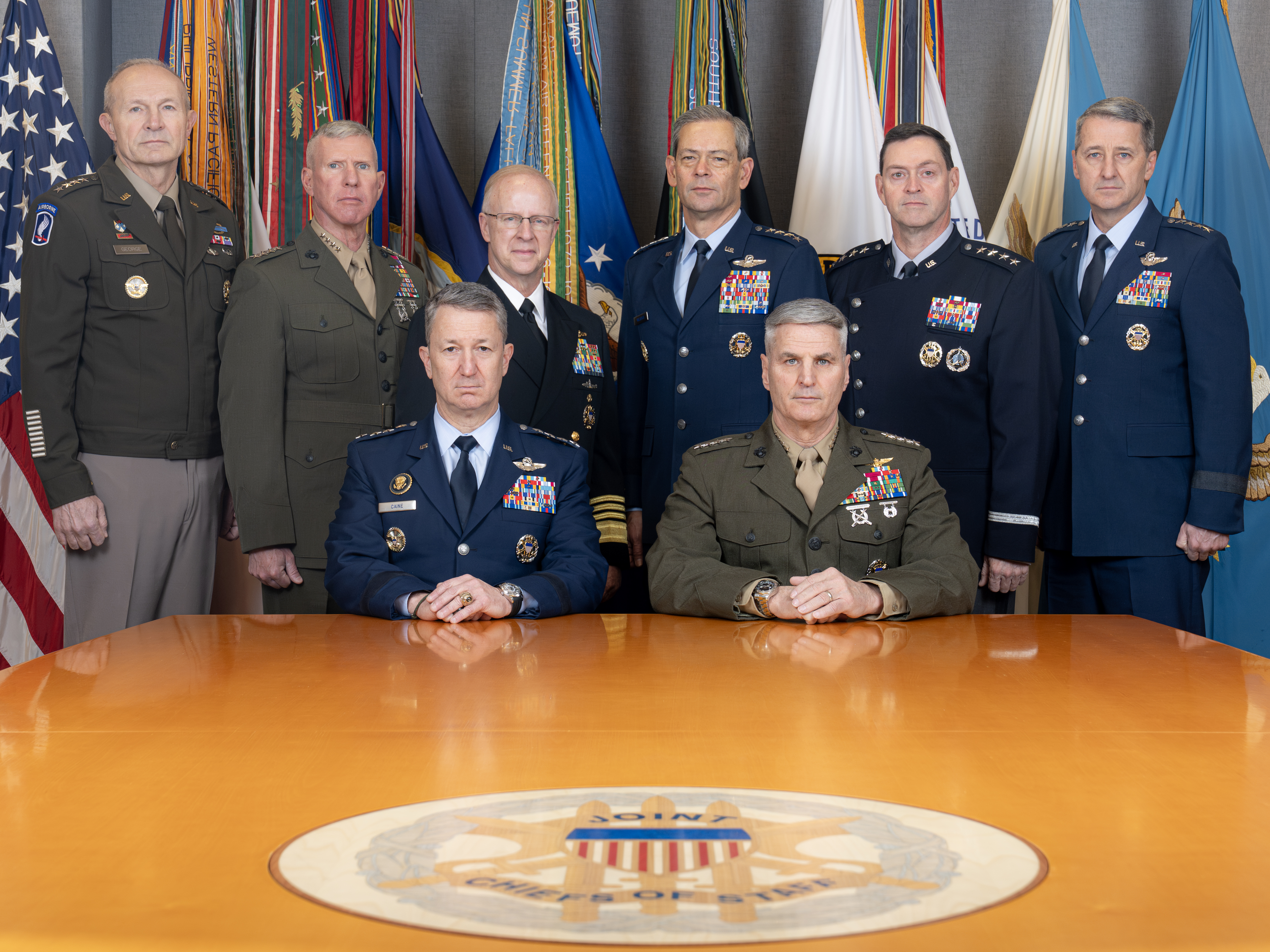
The Joint Chiefs of Staff in January 2026. Clockwise from left: George, Smith, Caudle, Wilsbach, Saltzman, Nordhaus, Mahoney, and Caine.

Although four-star officers appeared in organizations like the Continental Army before the United States of America was founded in 1776, the legislative history of four-star officers in the United States uniformed services began in 1799, when Congress authorized the grade of General of the Armies of the United States for former president George Washington, who was commanding the forces being raised for the Quasi-War with France as a lieutenant general of the U.S. Army but died without being promoted.

Congress revived Washington's never-used grade in 1866 with the title "General of the United States Army" and created a corresponding grade of admiral in the Navy. Unlike modern four-star grades, promotions to the 1866 grades were permanent and personal, vacating any previous grade and surviving any job change, like any other grade on the active list. Essentially decorative, permanent four-star grades on the active list carried full active-duty pay for life and were awarded sparingly to senior commanders after a war: after the Civil War to Army generals Ulysses S. Grant, William Tecumseh Sherman, and Philip Sheridan, and to Navy admirals David G. Farragut and David D. Porter; after the Spanish-American War to George Dewey, with the title Admiral of the Navy; after World War I to John J. Pershing, with the title General of the Armies; and after World War II to one temporary four-star officer in every armed service.

In 1915, Congress created a second category of four-star grades that lasted only while performing a specific function. These were temporary boosts in rank held while serving in important jobs, or as a personal grade during a wartime emergency. Upon leaving an office designated to carry four-star rank, or at the end of the war that authorized emergency or temporary four-star grades, officers reverted to their permanent two-star grade on the active list, although they typically regained their fourth star on the retired list. Modern four-star grades are descended from the functional grades of 1915, not the decorative grades of 1866, and continue to work in substantially the same way, as codified by the Officer Personnel Act of 1947 and the Defense Officer Personnel Management Act of 1980, which established the current unified framework for officer promotions in every armed service.

After World War II, Congress imposed strict limits on the number of four-star officers authorized for each service, but escalating global military commitments during the Cold War created many more four-star positions outside the services in joint and allied organizations. By 2024, the six armed services—Army, Navy, Air Force, Marine Corps, Space Force, Coast Guard—and the National Guard each had a four-star chief and vice chief and statutory or invited membership on the Joint Chiefs of Staff. The three larger services—Army, Navy, Air Force—were authorized additional four-star officers for internal positions, and a separate pool of general and flag officers was authorized for joint-duty assignments outside the services. Of the two non-armed uniformed services, the Public Health Service Commissioned Corps was headed by a four-star assistant secretary for health, if commissioned as a Uniformed Services officer, but the highest rank in the National Oceanic and Atmospheric Administration Commissioned Corps was three-star vice admiral.

== History ==
=== 1775–1865 ===
==== Revolutionary War ====
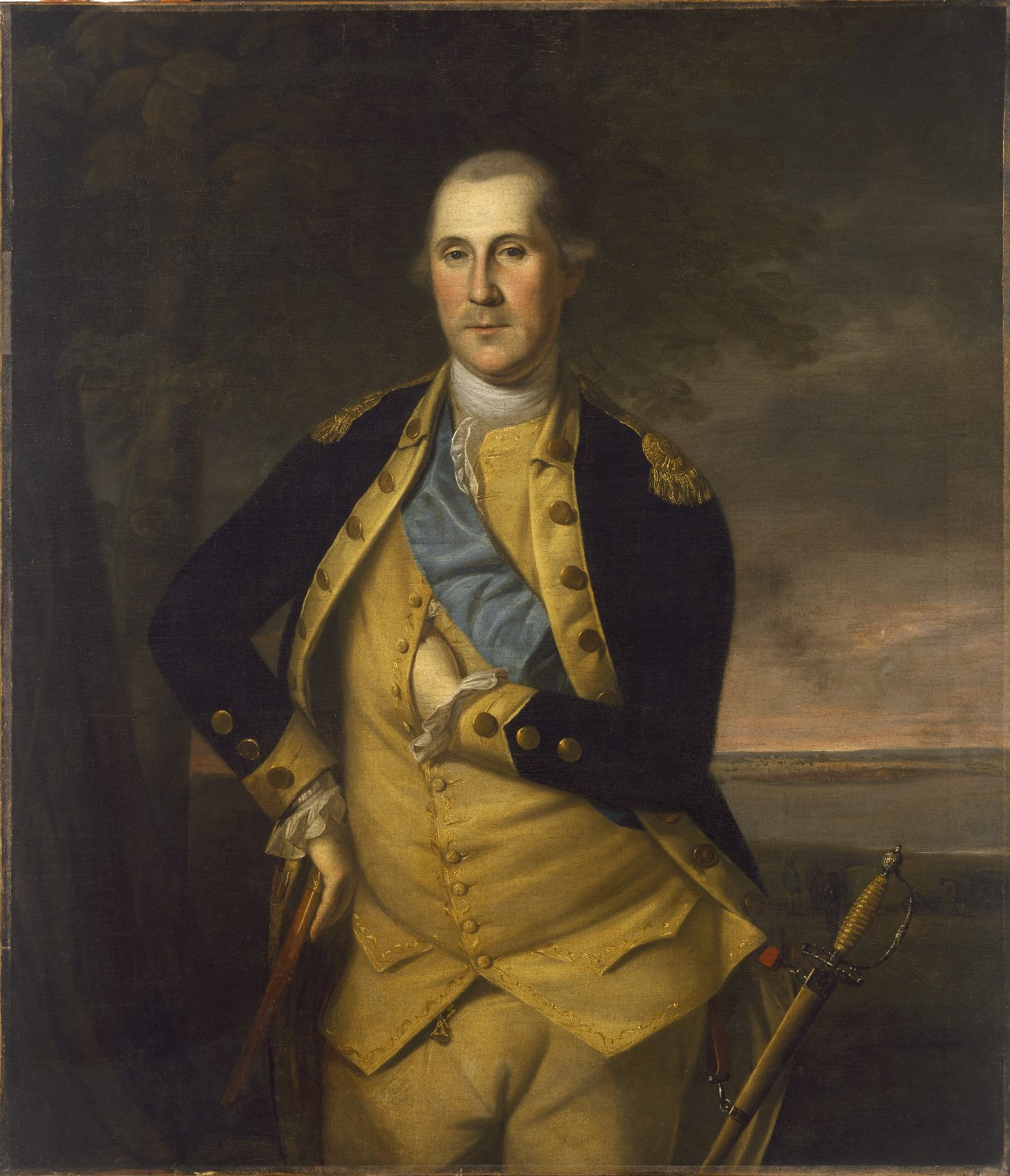
George Washington, general and commander in chief of the Continental Army.

In June 1775, the Continental Congress commissioned George Washington as general and commander in chief of the Continental Army during the American Revolution. Washington resigned his commission when the war ended in 1783. The Continental Army was disbanded in 1784 and replaced by the United States Army, whose highest-ranking officer was initially a lieutenant colonel.

==== Quasi-War ====
After his presidency, Washington was commissioned as lieutenant general and commander in chief of the Provisional Army being raised for the undeclared Quasi-War with France. In March 1799, Congress elevated his title to General of the Armies of the United States, but President John Adams thought Washington's office infringed on his presidential prerogatives as commander in chief and never made the appointment. Washington died later that year, and the grade lapsed when not mentioned in the 1802 law that defined the peacetime military establishment. He was promoted posthumously to the grade in 1978, after it was reestablished for him as part of the 1976 United States Bicentennial celebrations.

==== Civil War ====
During the Civil War, the Confederate forces appointed eight full generals and an admiral, but the highest ranking Union officers were a lieutenant general and a vice admiral, Ulysses S. Grant and David G. Farragut, who became the first full general and admiral in the United States military after the war.

=== 1866–1898 ===
==== Post-Civil War ====
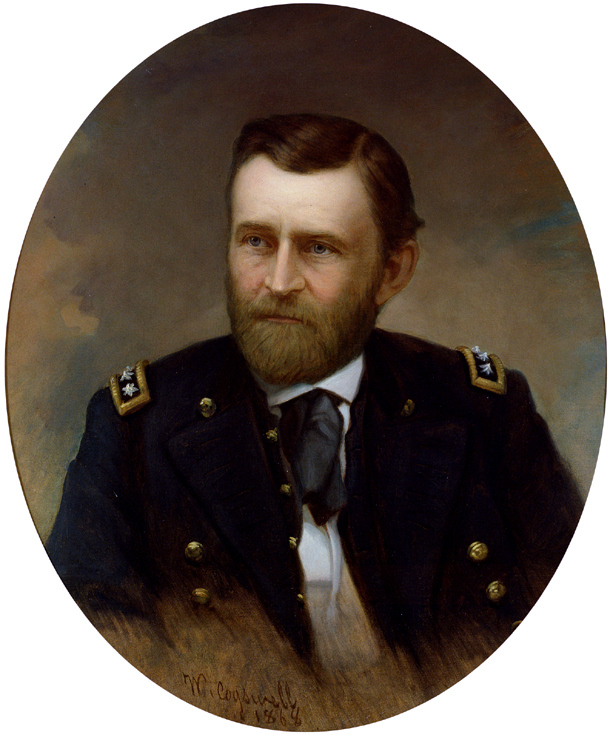
Ulysses S. Grant, first four-star general in the United States Army.

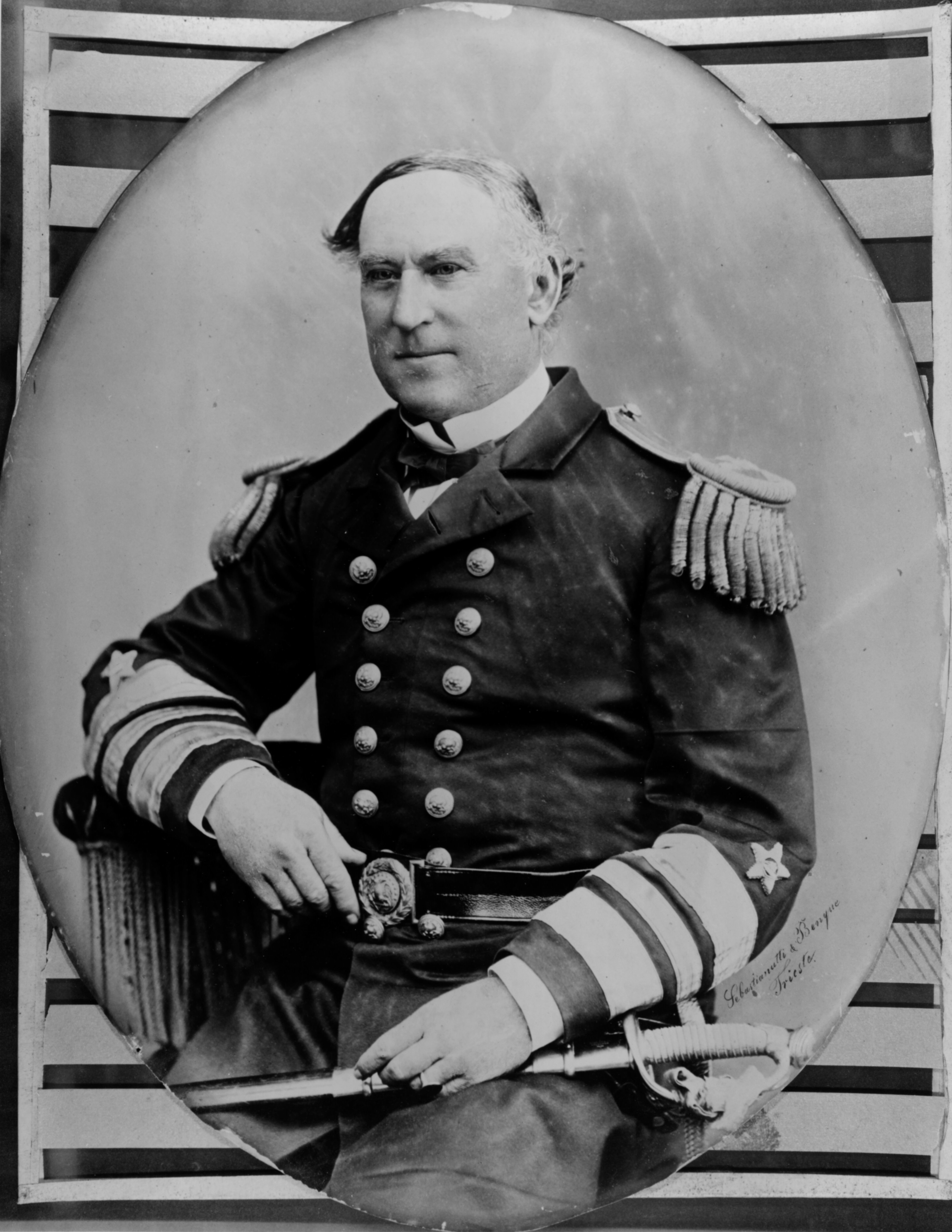
David G. Farragut, first four-star admiral in the United States Navy.

After the Civil War, the victorious general-in-chief of the Union Army, Ulysses S. Grant, and senior officer in the Navy, David G. Farragut, were rewarded with the first four-star promotions in the United States uniformed services. On July 25, 1866, Congress created the grade of admiral in the Navy and revived the grade of General of the Army of the United States that had been created (as "General of the Armies of the United States") for Washington in 1799 but never filled. Since there was only one four-star general in the Army during this period, the grade was referred to interchangeably as "general", "the General", and "the General of the Army", a title not to be confused with the five-star grade of general of the Army created in 1944. Similarly, the Navy's sole four-star admiral was often called "the Admiral of the Navy", a title that would evolve into a higher grade in 1899.

Grant resigned his commission to become president in 1869, and promoted the lieutenant general of the Army, William Tecumseh Sherman, to succeed him as general. Farragut died in 1870 and was succeeded by the vice admiral of the Navy, David D. Porter. Congress stopped further promotions to general in 1870 and to admiral in 1873, and the grades terminated when Sherman and Porter died in 1891.

In 1885, Grant was out of office, bankrupt, and dying, so Congress authorized the president to reappoint him to the rank and full pay of general on the retired list. Congress made a similar exception three years later to promote the ailing lieutenant general of the Army, Philip Sheridan, two months before his death.

=== 1899–1946 ===
==== Admiral of the Navy ====
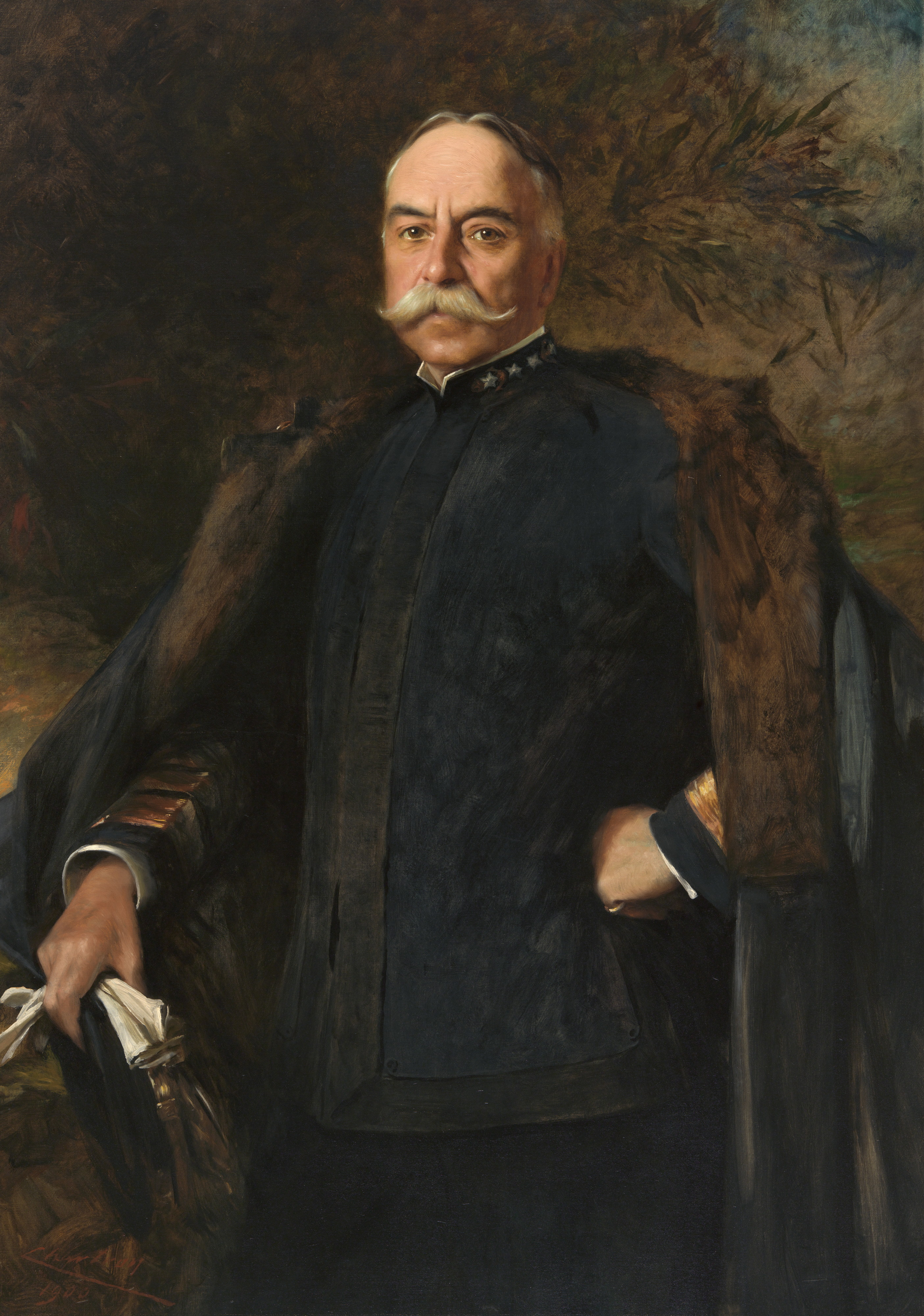
George Dewey, third four-star admiral in the United States Navy, whose unique grade of Admiral of the Navy evolved during his lifetime to rank higher than four-star admiral.

On March 2, 1899, Congress revived the grade of admiral to honor George Dewey for his victory at the Battle of Manila Bay during the Spanish-American War. Although titled "Admiral of the Navy" instead of "admiral", Dewey held the same grade as Farragut and Porter, who had also been called the Admiral of the Navy during their respective tenures as the only admiral in the Navy. The Comptroller of the Treasury ruled in 1900 that the grade of Admiral of the Navy revived the 1866 grade of admiral and therefore ranked with Sheridan's grade, which had the analogous title of "General of the Army of the United States".

By 1912, Navy officials were calling Dewey's grade equivalent to an admiral of the fleet, one rank higher than Farragut and Porter, as they lobbied Congress to permanently reestablish three- and four-star grades for peacetime use. However, Navy regulations continued to rank the Admiral of the Navy with a general in the Army until 1915, when the reestablished grades of admiral and vice admiral were inserted below the Admiral of the Navy, whose salute was increased to 19 guns from the 17 guns of an admiral or general. The annual pay of a 1915 admiral was only $10,000, while the Admiral of the Navy received $13,500, further distinguishing the two grades.

==== Designated admirals ====
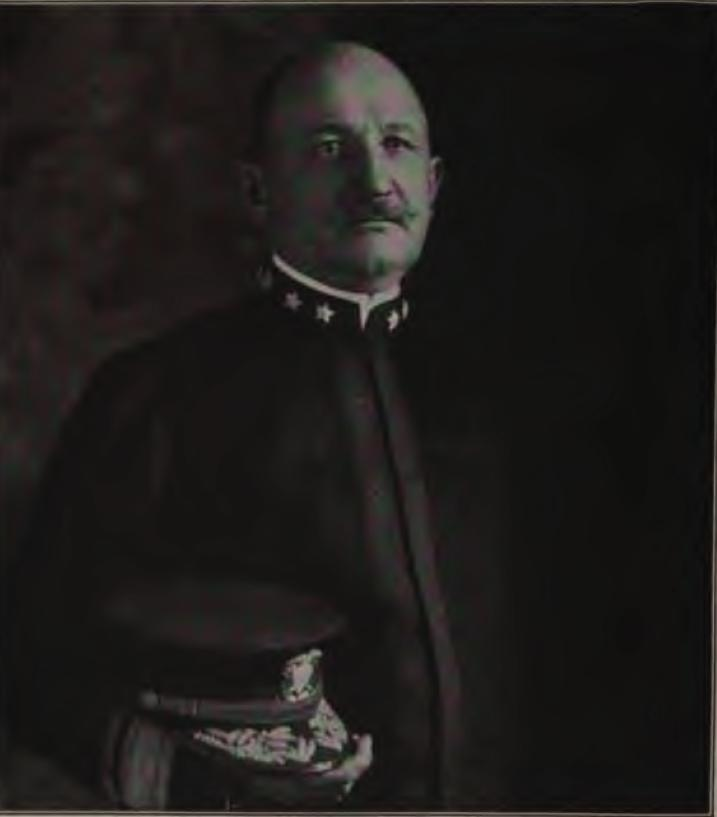
Walter C. Cowles, sixth four-star admiral in the United States Navy, and first to revert to rear admiral upon leaving an office designated to carry four-star rank.

Congress had always held that three- and four-star promotions were meant to reward conspicuous service in time of war, not routine peacetime assignments, and ignored decades of Navy pleas to revive the grades of admiral and vice admiral to keep overseas commanders from being outranked by foreign flag officers commanding smaller forces. By 1911, a compromise emerged whereby permanent promotions to admiral would still be reserved for war heroes like Dewey, but a rear admiral could be designated to hold temporary four-star rank while commanding a fleet and then revert to his permanent two-star grade. They therefore did not need Senate confirmation but also could not retire in that grade or, later, base a tombstone promotion on it.

On March 3, 1915, Congress authorized the president to designate up to six officers to have the rank and pay of admiral or vice admiral while assigned as commander in chief or second in command of the Atlantic Fleet, Pacific Fleet, or Asiatic Fleet. Frank F. Fletcher, Thomas B. Howard, and Walter C. Cowles, commanders in chief of the Atlantic, Pacific, and Asiatic Fleets, respectively, were designated as admirals on March 10, 11, and 12. Four months later, Cowles became the first admiral to revert to rear admiral when he relinquished command of the Asiatic Fleet and retired on July 10.

Although Congress specifically did not want designated admirals and vice admirals to be able to retire in those grades, legislation eventually advanced every former three- or four-star admiral to that rank on the retired list if he lived long enough, except for Husband E. Kimmel, who retired as a rear admiral after being relieved as four-star commander in chief of the Pacific Fleet after the attack on Pearl Harbor.

==== World War I ====
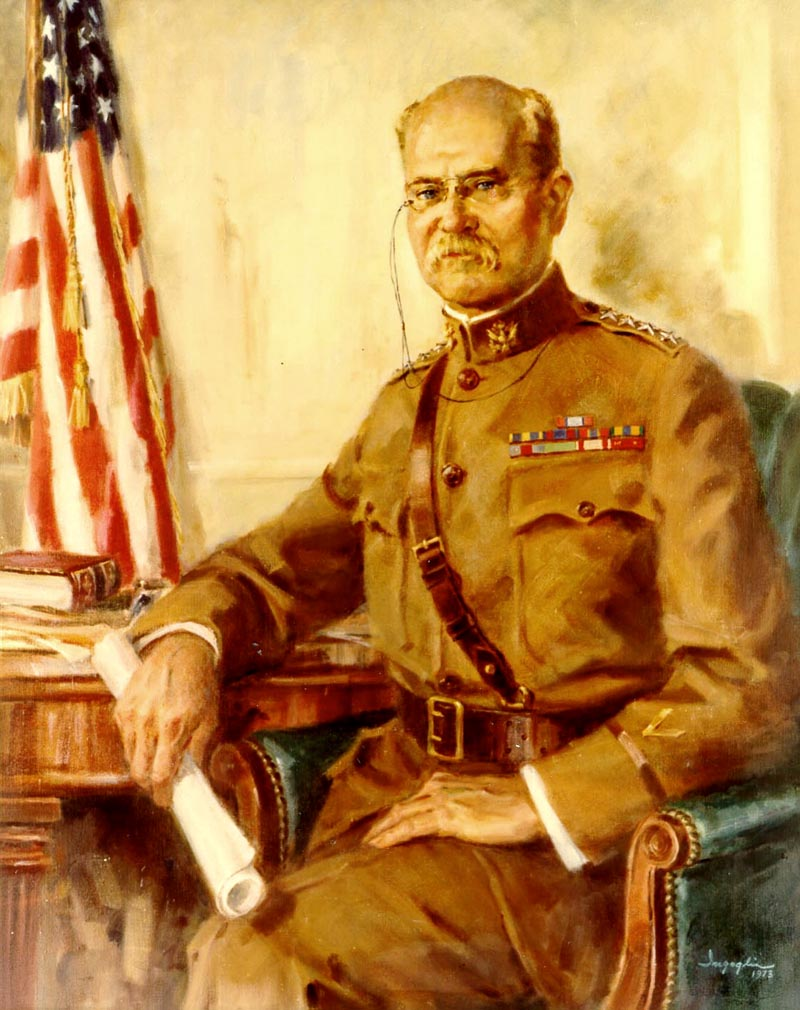
Tasker H. Bliss, fourth four-star general in the United States Army, who received a brevet promotion to general to keep his four-star rank after retiring as Army chief of staff.

Four-star grades reappeared in the Army in October 1917, when Congress authorized the chief of staff of the Army, Tasker H. Bliss, and the commander of the American Expeditionary Forces (AEF) in France, John J. Pershing, to hold the ex officio grades of general during the World War I emergency. Like a designated admiral, an emergency general's four-star rank was attached to his position, not his person, so when Bliss reached mandatory retirement age at the end of 1917, he reverted to his permanent grade of major general and was succeeded as emergency general and chief of staff by Peyton C. March. Because Bliss still needed four-star rank to serve alongside full generals from allied nations in his next assignment as United States permanent military representative to the Supreme War Council, he was reappointed emergency general by brevet, the last and highest brevet promotion awarded in the United States military.

All emergency grades expired at the end of the war, so in July 1919, eight months after the armistice, President Woodrow Wilson asked Congress to reward March and Pershing by making them both permanent generals, with Pershing senior to March. The House Military Affairs Committee reported out separate bills to promote Pershing and March to General of the Armies of the United States, reviving the grade originally created for Washington in 1799 and subsequently awarded to Grant, Sherman, and Sheridan as "General of the Army of the United States". March had made enemies in Congress during the war, so his bill did not pass and he reverted to major general when his emergency grade expired on June 30, 1920.

==== General of the Armies ====
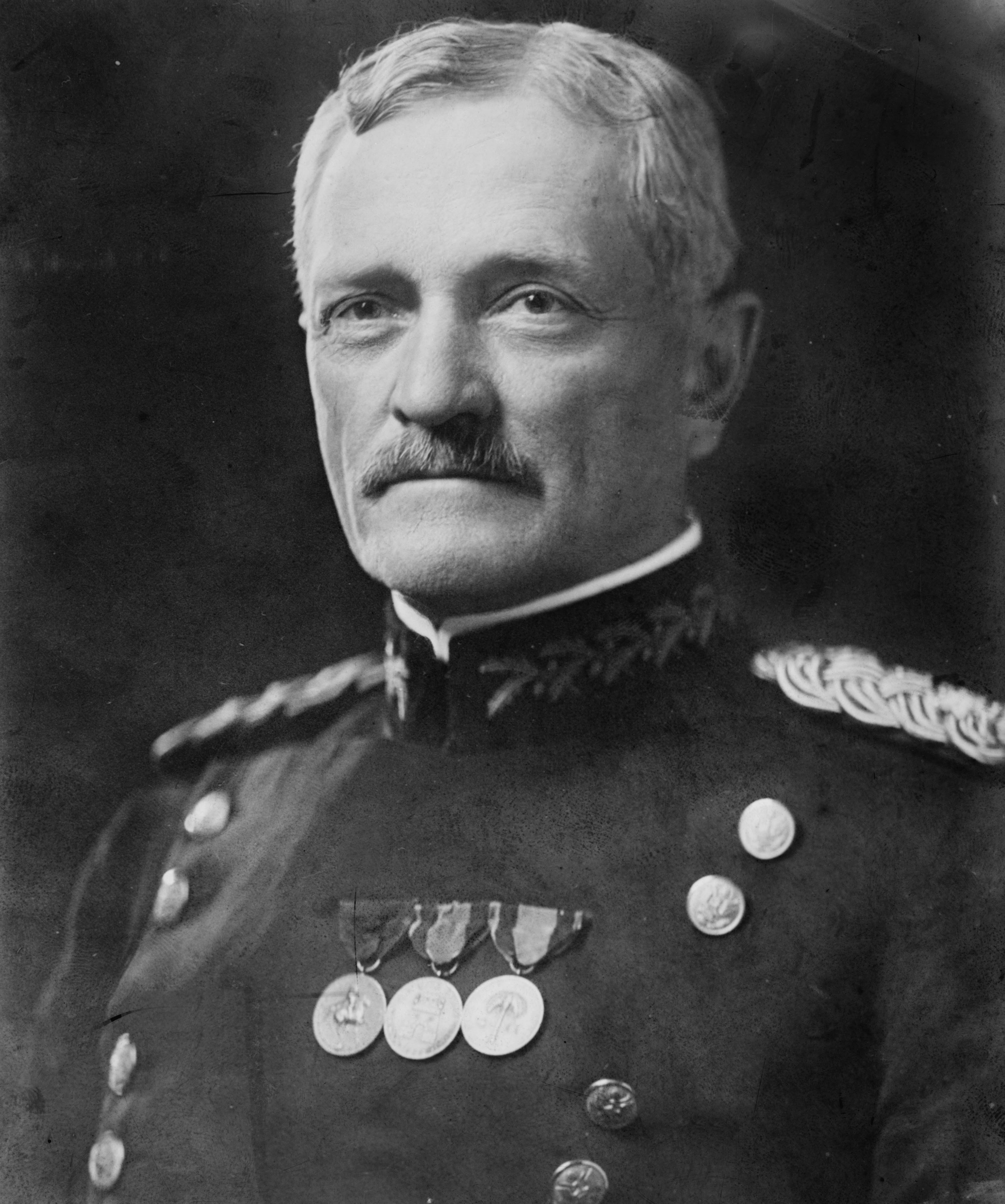
John J. Pershing, fifth four-star general in the United States Army, whose emergency World War I grade of general was made permanent in 1919 as General of the Armies.

The bill to promote Pershing to General of the Armies was signed into law on September 3, 1919, and he was nominated, confirmed, and appointed that same day. After serving as Army chief of staff, he retired at the statutory age of 64 in 1924. The Comptroller General of the United States ruled that the offices of "general", "General of the Army of the United States", and "General of the Armies of the United States" were all the same grade that was held by Grant, Sherman, and Sheridan, giving Pershing the annual pay of $13,500 and other privileges set for Sherman in 1870, including the right to retire at full pay and allowances.

In December 1928, anticipating the reauthorization of the rank of general for the Army chief of staff, the secretary of war increased the salute for the General of the Armies from the 17 guns of a four-star officer to the 19 guns that Dewey had received as Admiral of the Navy. Army and Navy publications subsequently ranked the General of the Armies with the Admiral of the Navy, treating both grades as senior to four-star service chiefs and five-star officers until they were finally dropped from regulations in 1955, long after the grades had expired with Dewey and Pershing.

==== Interwar ====
Pershing's successor as Army chief of staff, John L. Hines, was only a major general, which was again the Army's highest active-duty rank. Since the Navy still had 4 admirals—the chief of naval operations and the commanders in chief of the United States Fleet, Battle Fleet, and Asiatic Fleet—the Army asked in 1928 to have 4 generals: the chief of staff and the commanding generals of the Panama Canal Department, Hawaiian Department and Philippine Department. Only the increase in rank for the chief of staff was approved, starting in 1929 with Hines' successor, Charles P. Summerall. In 1940, special legislation advanced Hines to general on the retired list as the only living former chief of staff never to wear four stars.

==== World War II ====
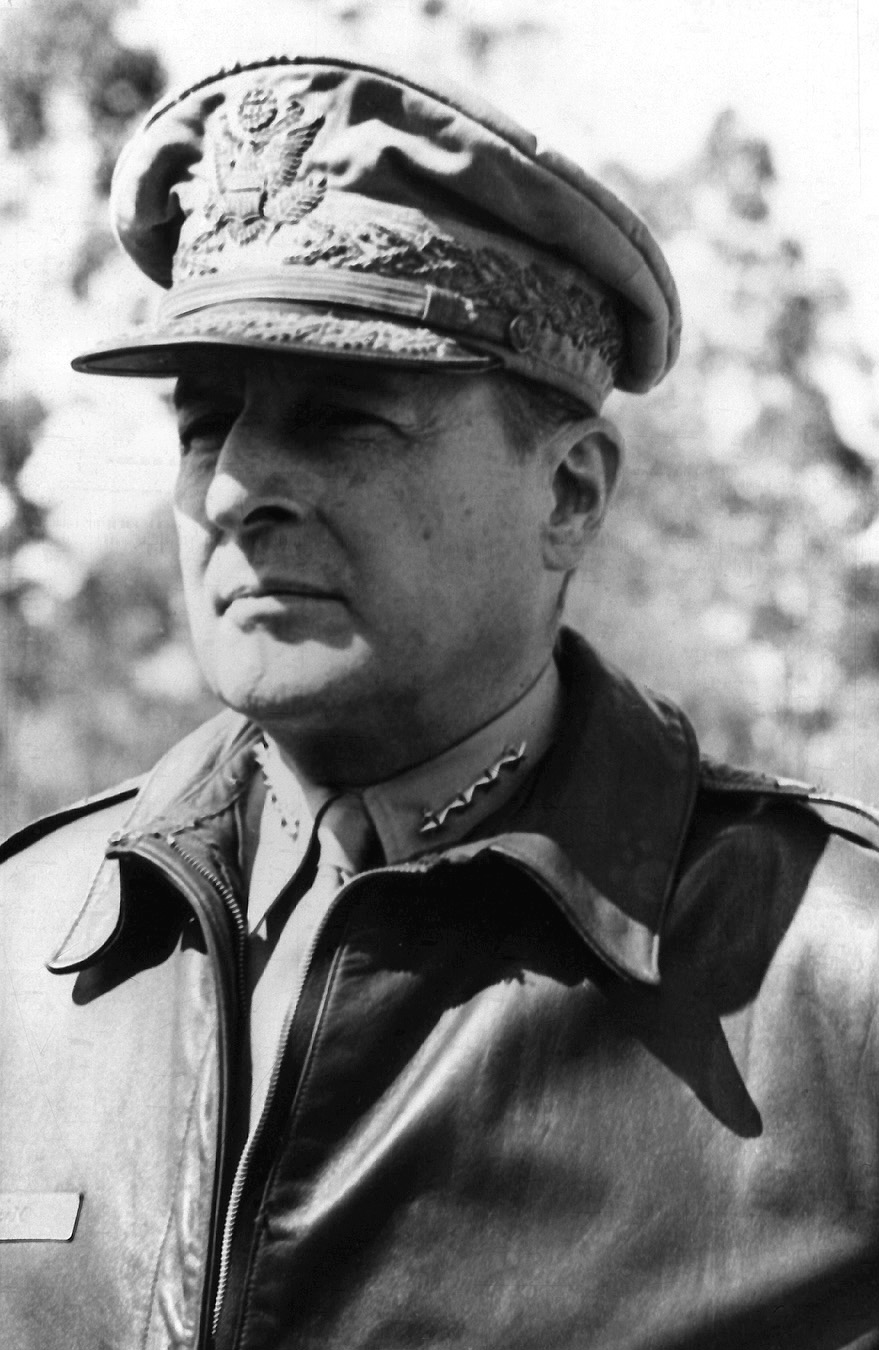
Douglas MacArthur reverted to major general after his term as four-star Army chief of staff, and later became the first temporary general in the Army of the United States during World War II and second five-star general of the Army.

The United States entered World War II on December 7, 1941, with 5 four-star officers permanently authorized: 1 Army general serving as chief of staff and 4 Navy admirals serving as chief of naval operations, as commanders in chief of the Atlantic Fleet and Asiatic Fleet; and as dual-hatted commander in chief of the Pacific Fleet and United States Fleet.

In addition to the 5 designated four-star officers and any retired four-star officers recalled to active duty, the president could appoint, subject to Senate confirmation, an unlimited number of four-star officers in temporary grades lasting up to six months after the end of the war or national emergency. On December 19, 1941, the Senate confirmed Douglas MacArthur to be the first temporary general in the Army of the United States as he fought the Japanese invasion of the Philippines. Temporary grades in the Navy were technically authorized only up to rear admiral, but the Senate confirmed temporary vice admirals and admirals when nominated, approving William F. Halsey Jr. as the first temporary admiral in November 1942 to reward his victory at the Naval Battle of Guadalcanal.

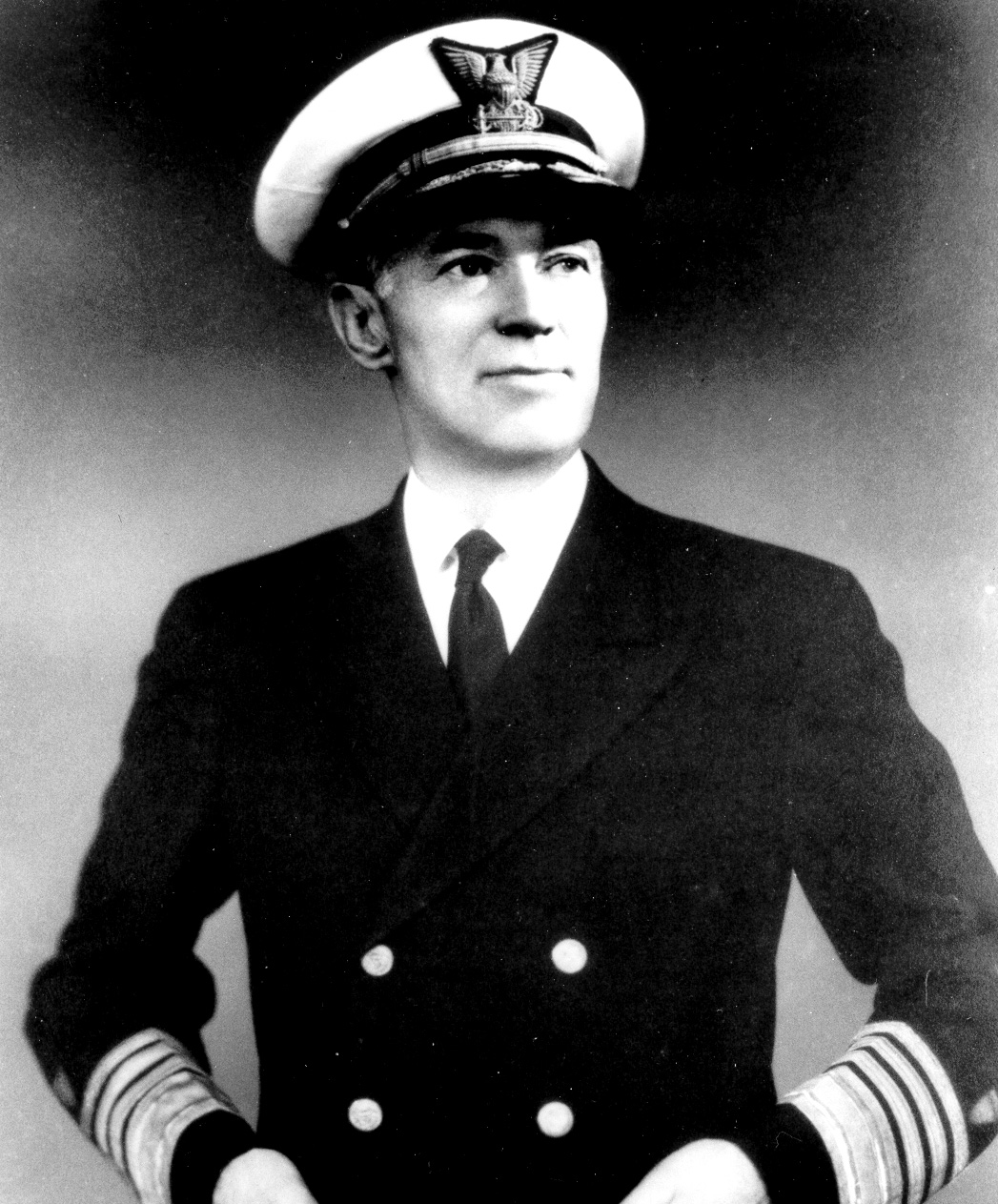
Russell R. Waesche, first four-star admiral in the United States Coast Guard.

Congress created five-star grades in December 1944, authorizing 4 temporary generals of the Army and 4 temporary fleet admirals of the United States Navy until six months after the end of the war. In March 1945, fulfilling a deal made to pass the five-star bill, the commandants of the Marine Corps and Coast Guard received four-star rank until six months after the end of the war. A year later, all five-star officers and each of the Marine Corps and Coast Guard commandants who held four-star rank during the war were rewarded with permanent promotions to those grades, including full active-duty pay and allowances in retirement. Since this gave the Marine Corps a permanent general, Alexander Vandegrift, and the Coast Guard a permanent admiral, Russell R. Waesche, the other three services were each granted one permanent four-star promotion in 1948: Navy admiral Raymond A. Spruance, Air Force general Carl Spaatz, and Army general Omar Bradley, later promoted to permanent five-star general.

=== 1947–1979 ===
==== National Security Act of 1947 ====
The National Security Act of 1947 elevated the Army Air Forces into an independent United States Air Force co-equal with the Army and Navy under a National Military Establishment headed by a secretary of defense. The act created the Central Intelligence Agency and National Security Council, and formally established the Joint Chiefs of Staff as principal military advisors to the president and secretary of defense, ratifying their wartime role. In 1949 the act was amended to convert the NME into a full executive department, the Department of Defense. The 1949 amendments also established a statutory chairman of the Joint Chiefs of Staff who outranked all other military officers.

==== Officer Personnel Act ====
The Officer Personnel Act of 1947 streamlined but did not try to unify the pre-war personnel systems of the Army and Navy. The president could designate a position of importance and responsibility to carry a four-star grade ex officio, and appoint an officer to hold that grade temporarily while serving in that position, subject to Senate consent. The Senate only had to approve an officer's first appointment to a four-star grade, not subsequent transfers to other four-star positions, except for positions required by statute to be confirmed by the Senate, like Army chief of staff. While transitioning between four-star assignments, an officer reverted to two-star major general or rear admiral, the highest permanent grade to which an officer could be promoted personally on the active list. An officer could retire with four stars if nominated by the president and confirmed by the Senate.

The number of four-star officers was capped at a fraction of the total number of general or flag officers in every service except the Marine Corps, in which four-star grades were only authorized for the specific offices of commandant or assistant commandant (or chief of staff to the president as commander in chief, an obsolete office), effectively disqualifying Marines from serving as chairman of the Joint Chiefs of Staff or commander in chief of a unified command. Similarly, the Coast Guard was limited by statute to only one four-star billet, the Commandant of the Coast Guard, but in 2016 the Congress authorized the Vice Commandant of the Coast Guard to hold four-star grade.

==== Korean War emergency ====
The peacetime caps on four-star officers were relaxed by the national emergency that was declared for the Korean War on December 16, 1950. Under the Officer Personnel Act, a national emergency doubled the Navy's four-star authorization from 4 to 8. When the various military and naval laws were consolidated into Title 10 of the United States Code in 1956, the president received authority to suspend even the higher caps on Navy four-star admirals during a national emergency, which he invoked by executive order in 1960 for the duration of the Korean War emergency. For the Army and Air Force, a national emergency removed all legislative caps on temporary three- and four-star appointments, which were limited only by the Senate's willingness to confirm and fund them.

The Korean War emergency and its higher four-star caps persisted until 1976, when the National Emergencies Act terminated all existing national emergencies effective September 14, 1978. By then the Navy was employing all 8 of its emergency four-star authorizations, so to prevent the return to peacetime caps from demoting half of the Navy's four-star admirals, the 1978 defense appropriation authorization act changed the Navy's four-star cap to be a percentage of the number of flag officers on the active list, using the same formula employed by the Army and Air Force.

==== O-10 pay grade ====
The Career Compensation Act of 1949 defined officer pay grades ranging from O-1 to a maximum of O-8 for a major general or rear admiral, the highest permanent grade to which an officer could be promoted on the active list under the Officer Personnel Act. Three-, four-, and five-star officers also held the O-8 pay grade, plus annual personal money allowances that were not creditable toward retirement, so three- and four-star officers received the same O-8 retired pay as a two-star officer, which was capped at 75 percent of the basic pay of a major general.

The Military Pay Act of 1958 created O-9 and O-10 pay grades for three- and four-star officers, with members of the Joint Chiefs of Staff given even higher pay within the O-10 grade, in addition to the personal money allowances. Officers could retire with up to 75 percent of their highest basic pay, finally giving four-star officers higher retired pay than two-star officers.

==== Tombstone promotions ====
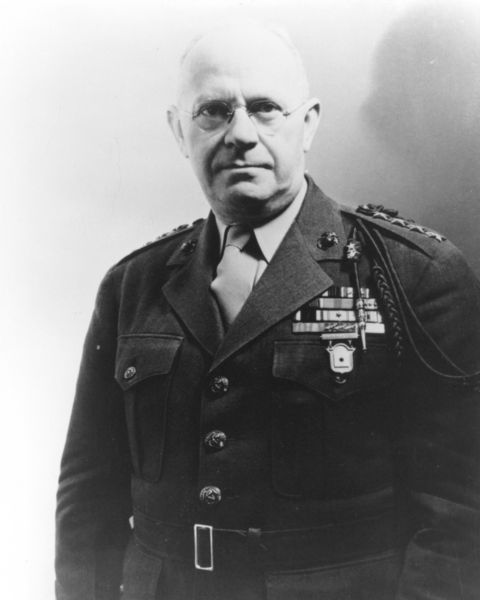
A tombstone promotion made Thomas Holcomb the first four-star general in the United States Marine Corps.

From 1944 to 1959, dozens of three-star officers in the Navy and Marine Corps, and one in the Coast Guard, retired with honorary tombstone promotions to the rank but not the pay of the next higher grade, having been commended for performance of duty in actual combat before the end of World War II. In January 1944, a tombstone promotion made retiring commandant Thomas Holcomb the first four-star general in Marine Corps history. Alan G. Kirk received the first tombstone promotion to four-star admiral when he retired in March 1946 to become ambassador to Belgium and Luxembourg, since active-duty officers could not accept civil or diplomatic appointments without special legislation. After serving as Coast Guard commandant after its rank was reduced from four stars to three stars, Merlin O'Neill still got his fourth star via tombstone promotion, the only Coast Guard officer to do so.

Congress occasionally gave a posthumous fourth star to a three-star officer who died before a scheduled promotion to that rank. Special legislation promoted Marine Corps lieutenant general Roy S. Geiger and Navy vice admiral John S. McCain, who were entitled to retire with a tombstone promotion but died of illness first, and Army lieutenant general Walton H. Walker, who died in a traffic accident in the Korean War combat theater.

=== 1980–2016 ===
==== Defense Officer Personnel Management Act ====
The Defense Officer Personnel Management Act (DOPMA) of 1980 created a unified framework to appoint four-star officers in all services. The president could designate positions of importance and responsibility to carry four-star rank, to be filled by general and flag officers on active duty in any service. All four-star promotions, reassignments, and retirements had to be confirmed by the Senate. Generals and admirals held four-star rank only while serving in designated positions, while transitioning between four-star assignments, for up to 6 months while hospitalized, or for up to 90 days (reduced to 60 days in 1991) pending retirement.

==== Goldwater–Nichols Act ====
The Goldwater–Nichols Department of Defense Reorganization Act of 1986 restructured defense leadership to empower the chairman of the Joint Chiefs of Staff and combatant commanders relative to the service chiefs, after poor joint operation was blamed for a series of military embarrassments in the early 1980s, especially during the failed 1980 Iranian hostage rescue mission, the 1983 bombings of the Marine barracks in Beirut, and the 1983 invasion of Grenada.

The act made the chairman of the Joint Chiefs of Staff the principal military advisor to the president, a role previously played by the Joint Chiefs collectively, and created a four-star vice chairman to preside in the chairman's absence. It expanded the powers of the combatant commanders, creating a new unified combatant command for special operations with a statutory four-star commander and repealing the ban on a unified combatant command for transportation.

==== Percentage caps ====
DOPMA originally capped the number of four-star officers in the Army, Navy, and Air Force using the same formula as the Officer Personnel Act: 3.75 percent of all general or flag officers on active duty in each service (25 percent of the 15 percent who could be above two-star rank). In 1987, Congress authorized up to 15 percent of all three- and four-star grades to be transferred between services by offsetting any increase in one service with a corresponding decrease in another service, keeping the total number constant and making it easier for services to compete for joint four-star positions. The chairman and vice chairman of the Joint Chiefs of Staff were excluded from the grade cap formula, and Congress exempted the remaining joint four-star positions in 1994, including the commanders of combatant commands and U.S. forces in Korea, and the deputy commander of U.S. European Command if its commander was also the NATO supreme commander in Europe.

==== Joint pool ====
In 2009, Congress dropped the percentage-based grade cap formula and directly specified the maximum number of four-star officers in each service. The National Defense Authorization Act for Fiscal Year 2010 provided separate allocations for institutional four-star officers within each service—7 Army generals, 6 Navy admirals, 9 Air Force generals, and 2 Marine Corps generals—and a joint pool of up to 20 four-star officers allocated to the secretary of defense, which at the time included the chairman and vice chairman of the Joint Chiefs of Staff, 9 combatant commanders, and 4 sub-unified commanders for U.S. forces in Korea, Iraq, and Afghanistan, and for cyber warfare. Two years later, Congress eliminated the remaining statutory exemptions for intelligence positions like the director or deputy director of the Central Intelligence Agency, and for the chief of the National Guard Bureau, and charged those four-star positions against the joint pool as well.

==== Public Health Service ====
The U.S. Public Health Service Commissioned Corps had its own set of grades that were derived from the pre-1947 grades of the Navy Medical Corps, but used the equivalent modern naval ranks except in legal documents. Congress created the O-10 grade in the Public Health Service in 1990, to be held whenever a Commissioned Corps officer served as assistant secretary for health, the political appointee overseeing the uniformed surgeon general of the United States. This resolved an anomalous rank inversion created by the 1989 appointment of a two-star Commissioned Corps admiral, James O. Mason, as assistant secretary for health to supervise a three-star surgeon general, C. Everett Koop.

==== National Guard ====
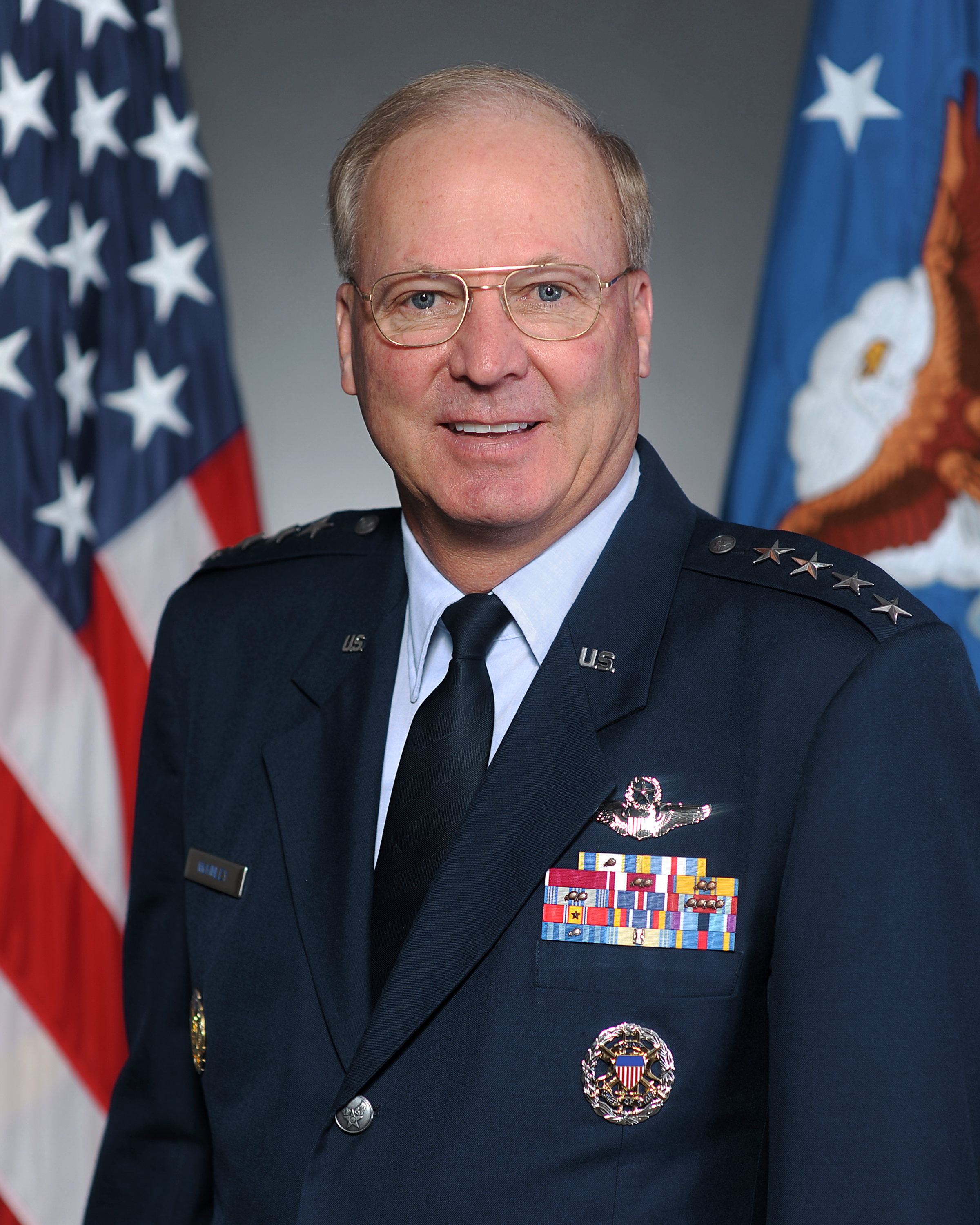
Craig R. McKinley, first four-star general in the National Guard.

After the September 11 attacks in 2001, the National Guard and Reserves completed their post-Cold War transformation from a rarely mobilized strategic reserve to an operational force in continual use at home and abroad, leading the chief of the National Guard Bureau and the state adjutants general to lobby for a National Guard seat on the Joint Chiefs of Staff. The National Guard Empowerment Act of 2007 (enacted as part of the National Defense Authorization Act for Fiscal Year 2008) gave the CNGB a fourth star but no JCS seat, making Air National Guard director Craig R. McKinley the first four-star National Guard officer in November 2008. The chairman of the JCS invited the CNGB to attend its meetings along with the commandant of the Coast Guard, much as the commandant of the Marine Corps had attended by invitation from 1952 until being elevated to full member in 1978. The National Defense Authorization Act for Fiscal Year 2012 made the CNGB a statutory member of the JCS on December 31, 2011.

=== 2017–present ===
==== Space Force ====
The United States Space Force Act, part of the National Defense Authorization Act for Fiscal Year 2020, redesignated Air Force Space Command (AFSPC) as the United States Space Force in 2019, establishing the first new military service since the Air Force was spun off from the Army in 1947. The incumbent AFSPC commander, Air Force general John W. Raymond, transferred to the new service as its first chief of space operations.

==== Grade caps ====
The four-star grade caps of 7 Army generals, 6 Navy admirals, 9 Air Force generals, 2 Marine Corps generals, and 20 joint-duty four-star officers remained unchanged from 2009 until 2020, when the Army asked for an eighth general to command its forces in Europe and Africa. Congress kept the total number of four-star officers constant by transferring a slot from the joint pool to the Army's allocation.

Effective December 31, 2022, the 2017 NDAA cut the total number of general and flag officers in joint-duty positions that were exempted from grade caps by 25 percent, but deleted the grade distribution restrictions for those positions, which previously had been limited to 19 joint-duty four-star officers. The 2023 NDAA capped the Space Force at 2 generals, corresponding to the chief and vice chief of space operations.

== Major legislation ==
Legislation	Citation	Summary	Service
Act of March 3, 1799	1 Stat. 752	Authorized commander of the army of the United States to be commissioned General of the Armies of the United States (intended for George Washington) [repealed in 1802 (2 Stat. 133)].	USA
Act of July 25, 1866	14 Stat. 222	Authorized one grade of admiral (David G. Farragut, David D. Porter) [terminated at next vacancy in 1873 (17 Stat. 418)].	USN
Act of July 25, 1866	14 Stat. 223	Revived grade of general of the army of the United States (Ulysses S. Grant, William T. Sherman) [terminated at next vacancy in 1870 (16 Stat. 318)].	USA
Act of March 1, 1869	15 Stat. 281	Authorized brevet ranks for distinguished conduct and public service in presence of the enemy (Tasker H. Bliss) [repealed in 1956 (70A Stat. 642)].	USA
Act of March 3, 1885	23 Stat. 434	Authorized on the retired list the rank and full pay of General or General-in-Chief for one person who served as General commanding the armies of the United States or General-in-Chief (Ulysses S. Grant).	USA
Act of June 1, 1888	25 Stat. 165	Authorized one appointment to the grade of General of the Army of the United States (Philip H. Sheridan).	USA
Act of March 2, 1899; Act of March 3, 1899	30 Stat. 995; 30 Stat. 1045	Authorized one appointment of an Admiral of the Navy (George Dewey).	USN
Act of March 3, 1915	38 Stat. 941	Authorized rank of admiral for officers designated as commander in chief of the United States Atlantic Fleet, United States Pacific Fleet, or Asiatic Fleet.	USN
Act of August 29, 1916	39 Stat. 558	Increased rank of chief of naval operations to admiral, to rank next after the Admiral of the Navy.	USN
Act of October 6, 1917	40 Stat. 410	Authorized emergency grade of general for chief of staff of the Army (Tasker H. Bliss, Peyton C. March) and commander of United States forces in France (John J. Pershing) during the World War I emergency [terminated in 1920 (41 Stat. 760)].	USA
Act of September 3, 1919	41 Stat. 283	Revived office of General of the Armies of the United States to be specially conferred upon a general officer of the Army for distinguished higher command of military forces on foreign soil during World War I (John J. Pershing).	USA
Act of February 23, 1929	45 Stat. 1255	Increased rank of chief of staff of the Army to general.	USA
Act of June 21, 1930	46 Stat. 793	Authorized promotion on the retired list or posthumously to highest grade held during World War I, but with no increase in retired pay (Army: Tasker H. Bliss, Peyton C. March; Navy: Henry T. Mayo, William B. Caperton, William S. Benson, William S. Sims, Henry B. Wilson Jr., Hugh Rodman, Albert Gleaves, Robert E. Coontz, Joseph Strauss, Hilary P. Jones).	USA, USN
Act of September 9, 1940	54 Stat. 875	Authorized Regular Army officers to be appointed to temporary higher grades in time of war or national emergency.	USA
Act of July 24, 1941	55 Stat. 603	Authorized Regular Navy and Marine Corps officers to be appointed to temporary higher ranks or grades in time of war or national emergency.	USN
Act of July 28, 1942	56 Stat. 722	Authorized posthumous commissions for officers who died in the line of duty before receiving a grade to which they had been promoted or recommended for promotion after September 8, 1939 (George B. Simler).	USA, USN, USMC
Act of December 14, 1944	58 Stat. 802	Authorized until six months after the end of World War II [made permanent in 1946 (60 Stat. 59)]: 1. 4 grades of general of the Army, appointed from Army officers serving in any general officer grade (George C. Marshall Jr., Douglas MacArthur, Dwight D. Eisenhower, Henry H. Arnold); and; 2. 4 grades of fleet admiral of the United States Navy, appointed from Navy line officers serving in the rank of admiral (William D. Leahy, Ernest J. King, Chester W. Nimitz, William F. Halsey Jr.).	USA, USN
Act of March 21, 1945	59 Stat. 36	Authorized one grade of general, appointed from officers serving now or hereafter as commandant of the Marine Corps, until six months after the end of World War II (Alexander A. Vandegrift) [made permanent in 1946 (60 Stat. 59)].	USMC
Act of March 21, 1945	59 Stat. 37	Authorized one grade of admiral, appointed from officers serving now or hereafter as commandant of the Coast Guard, until six months after the end of World War II (Russell R. Waesche, Joseph F. Farley) [made permanent for Waesche in 1946 (60 Stat. 59)].	USCG
Act of July 26, 1947 [National Security Act of 1947]	61 Stat. 503; 61 Stat. 505	Established U.S. Air Force.; Established Joint Chiefs of Staff comprising the service chiefs of the Army, Navy, and Air Force, and the chief of staff to the commander in chief, if one exists [replaced by chairman of Joint Chiefs of Staff in 1949 (63 Stat. 581)].	USAF
Act of August 7, 1947 [Officer Personnel Act of 1947]	61 Stat. 874; 61 Stat. 875; 61 Stat. 876; 61 Stat. 880; 61 Stat. 886; 61 Stat. 904; 61 Stat. 907	Authorized president to designate, subject to Senate confirmation: 1. Army officers to have the rank of general while assigned to positions of importance and responsibility; and; 2. Navy officers on the active list to have the grade of admiral while commanding fleets, subdivisions of fleets, or naval units afloat organized to perform a special or unusual mission, or while performing any duty of great importance and responsibility.; Capped: 1. Army and Air Force positions with ranks above major general at 15 percent of the total number of general officers serving on active federal military duty, of which not more than 25 percent to carry the rank of general; and; 2. Navy officers on the active list in grades above rear admiral at 15 percent of the total number of flag officers authorized in the line of the Regular Navy, of whom not more than 8 to serve in the grade of admiral.; Authorized all Navy and Marine Corps officers to retire with the rank but not the pay of the next higher grade if specially commended for performance of duty in actual combat on or before December 31, 1946.	USA, USN, USAF, USMC
Act of June 26, 1948	62 Stat. 1052	Authorized permanent grade of general or admiral and full active-duty pay and allowances in retirement for officers serving in the temporary grade of: 1. general since March 29, 1945, who successfully commanded an army group composed of as many as four armies in the field against the enemy from August 1, 1944, to August 15, 1945 (Omar N. Bradley); 2. general since March 29, 1945, who commanded the U.S. Army Strategic Air Force, European Theater of Operations, from January 1, 1944, to March 1, 1946 (Carl A. Spaatz); or; 3. admiral since February 4, 1944, who commanded a major combatant unit in the Pacific Theater of Operations during World War II (Raymond A. Spruance).	USA, USN, USAF
Act of August 4, 1949	63 Stat. 498; 63 Stat. 516; 63 Stat. 558	Reduced rank of commandant of the Coast Guard to vice admiral, without reducing the grade of the current commandant (Joseph F. Farley).; Authorized Coast Guard officers to retire with the rank but not the pay of the next higher grade if specially commended for performance of duty in actual combat on or before December 31, 1946 (Merlin O'Neill).	USCG
Act of August 10, 1949 [National Security Act Amendments of 1949]	63 Stat. 581	Established chairman of the Joint Chiefs of Staff with grade of general or admiral, who outranks all other officers and presides over meetings of the Joint Chiefs of Staff but has no vote [elevated to voting member in 1958 (72 Stat. 519)]; Exempted from caps the chairman of the Joint Chiefs of Staff.	USA, USN, USAF
Act of September 18, 1950 [Private Law 81-957]	64 Stat. A224	Authorized promotion of Omar N. Bradley to permanent grade of general of the Army, for distinguished services and not because he was serving as chairman of the Joint Chiefs of Staff.	USA
Act of May 20, 1958 [Uniformed Services Pay Act of 1958]	72 Stat. 122; 72 Stat. 124	Established pay grades O-10 for four-star officers and O-9 for three-star officers, with higher pay within the O-10 grade for service chiefs and the chairman of the Joint Chiefs of Staff.	USA, USN, USAF, USMC, USCG
Act of August 11, 1959	73 Stat. 337	Repealed authorization for Navy, Marine Corps, and Coast Guard officers to retire with the rank but not the pay of the next higher grade if specially commended for performance of duty in actual combat, effective November 1, 1959.	USN, USMC, USCG
Act of May 14, 1960	74 Stat. 144	Increased rank of commandant of the Coast Guard to admiral, effective June 1, 1960.	USCG
Act of May 2, 1969	83 Stat. 8	Authorized grade of general for assistant commandant of the Marine Corps if total active duty strength of Marine Corps exceeds 200,000 at time of appointment [strength requirement repealed in 1976 (90 Stat. 202)].	USMC
Act of November 16, 1973 [Department of Defense Appropriation Authorization Act, 1974]	87 Stat. 621	Authorized promotion of Hyman G. Rickover to admiral on the retired list.	USN
Act of September 14, 1976 [National Emergencies Act]	90 Stat. 1255	Terminated all existing national emergencies, effective September 14, 1978.	USA, USN, USAF, USMC
Act of October 11, 1976	90 Stat. 2078	Authorized posthumous promotion of George Washington to General of the Armies.	USA
Act of December 12, 1980 [Defense Officer Personnel Management Act]	94 Stat. 2844; 94 Stat. 2849; 94 Stat. 2863; 94 Stat. 2864; 94 Stat. 2868; 94 Stat. 2875	Authorized president to designate positions of importance and responsibility to carry the grade of general or admiral, to be assigned from officers on active duty in any grade above colonel or captain, subject to Senate confirmation, who revert to their permanent grade at the end of their assignment unless it was terminated by; 1. assignment to another position designated to carry the same grade, 2. up to 180 days of hospitalization, or; 3. up to 90 days prior to retirement [reduced to 60 days in 1991 (105 Stat. 1354)].; Capped, except during war or national emergency: 1. Army, Air Force, and Navy officers in grades above major general or rear admiral at 15 percent of all general or flag officers on active duty, of whom not more than 25 percent to serve in the grade of general or admiral; 2. Marine Corps officers in grades above major general at 15 percent of all general officers on active duty.; Authorized three- and four-star officers to retire in the highest grade held on active duty, at the discretion of the president and subject to confirmation by the Senate, with no time-in-grade requirement.	USA, USN, USAF, USMC
Act of October 1, 1986 [Goldwater-Nichols Department of Defense Reorganization Act of 1986]	100 Stat. 1006; 100 Stat. 1008; 100 Stat. 1010; 100 Stat. 1041; 100 Stat. 1051; 100 Stat. 1054; 100 Stat. 1062	Established vice chairman of the Joint Chiefs of Staff, who outranks all other officers except the chairman of the Joint Chiefs of Staff, may not be from the same service as the chairman, and may not vote in meetings of the Joint Chiefs of Staff unless acting as chairman [elevated to voting member in 1992 (106 Stat. 2473)].; Exempted from caps the vice chairman of the Joint Chiefs of Staff.; Specified grade of general or admiral for service vice chiefs and the chairman and vice chairman of the Joint Chiefs of Staff.	USA, USN, USAF, USMC
Act of December 4, 1987 [National Defense Authorization Act for Fiscal Years 1988 and 1989]	101 Stat. 1088	Authorized additional appointments to general or admiral in one service if offset by corresponding reductions in other services, up to 15 percent of the total number of officers serving in those grades in all services.	USA, USN, USAF, USMC
Act of November 3, 1990	104 Stat. 1289	Specified O-10 grade for a commissioned officer of the Public Health Service serving as Assistant Secretary for Health.	USPHSCC
Act of October 5, 1994 [National Defense Authorization Act for Fiscal Year 1995]	108 Stat. 2744	Exempted from caps the following joint four-star positions, but only if the service secretaries nominated at least one officer from the Army, Navy, Marine Corps, and Air Force to fill them: 1. commander of a combatant command or U.S. Forces Korea, and; 2. deputy commander of U.S. European Command, but only if the commander is also the Supreme Allied Commander, Europe [repealed in 2016 (130 Stat. 2102)].	USA, USN, USAF, USMC
Act of February 10, 1996 [National Defense Authorization Act for Fiscal Year 1996]	110 Stat. 292	Repealed requirement that retirement in three- or four-star grades be confirmed by the Senate.; Required secretary of defense to certify in writing to the president and Congress that an officer served on active duty satisfactorily in the grade of general or admiral before that officer can retire in that grade.; Required at least three years on active duty in three- or four-star grades to be eligible to voluntarily retire in those grades, which the president could waive for extreme hardship or exceptional circumstances but not if the officer was under investigation for misconduct.	USA, USN, USAF, USMC
Act of October 17, 1998 [Strom Thurmond National Defense Authorization Act for Fiscal Year 1999]	112 Stat. 2035	Authorized promotion of Benjamin O. Davis Jr. to general on the retired list, with no increase in compensation or benefits.	USAF
Act of January 28, 2008 [National Guard Empowerment Act of 2007]	122 Stat. 496; 122 Stat. 501; 122 Stat. 502	Increased grade of chief of the National Guard Bureau to general.	NGB
Act of October 28, 2009 [National Defense Authorization Act for Fiscal Year 2010]	123 Stat. 2273; 123 Stat. 2274; 123 Stat. 2276	Capped officers in the grade of general or admiral at 7 Army generals, 6 Navy admirals, 9 Air Force generals, and 2 Marine Corps generals, exempting from caps the chief of the National Guard Bureau and up to 20 generals or admirals assigned to joint duty [joint-duty cap repealed in 2016, effective December 31, 2022 (130 Stat. 2100); caps changed in 2021 to 8 Army generals and 19 joint-duty generals or admirals (134 Stat. 3563)].	USA, USN, USAF, USMC, NGB
Act of February 8, 2016 [Coast Guard Authorization Act of 2015]	130 Stat. 33	Increased grade of vice commandant of the Coast Guard to admiral.	USCG
Act of December 20, 2019 [United States Space Force Act]	133 Stat. 1561; 133 Stat. 1563	Redesignated Air Force Space Command as U.S. Space Force.; Established chief of space operations with grade of general, who could serve concurrently as commander of U.S. Space Command for one year following the enactment of this Act, without further appointment (John W. Raymond).	USSF
Act of December 23, 2022 [James M. Inhofe National Defense Authorization Act for Fiscal Year 2023]	136 Stat. 2557; 136 Stat. 2611	Capped Space Force officers in the grade of general at 2, exempting generals assigned to joint duty.; Authorized posthumous promotion of Ulysses S. Grant to General of the Armies with the same rank and precedence as John J. Pershing.	USA, USSF
Act of December 22, 2023 [National Defense Authorization Act for Fiscal Year 2024]	137 Stat. 244	Increased grade of vice chief of the National Guard Bureau to general.	NGB
Act of December 18, 2025 [National Defense Authorization Act for Fiscal Year 2026]	TBD	Authorized the statutory grade of general for the commander of Air Force Global Strike Command.	USAF

== See also ==
- List of active duty United States four-star officers
- List of United States Army four-star generals
- List of United States Navy four-star admirals
- List of United States Air Force four-star generals
- List of United States Marine Corps four-star generals
- List of United States Space Force four-star generals
- List of United States Coast Guard four-star admirals
- List of United States Public Health Service Commissioned Corps four-star admirals
