= Edwin J. Roland =

USCG admiral (1905-1985)

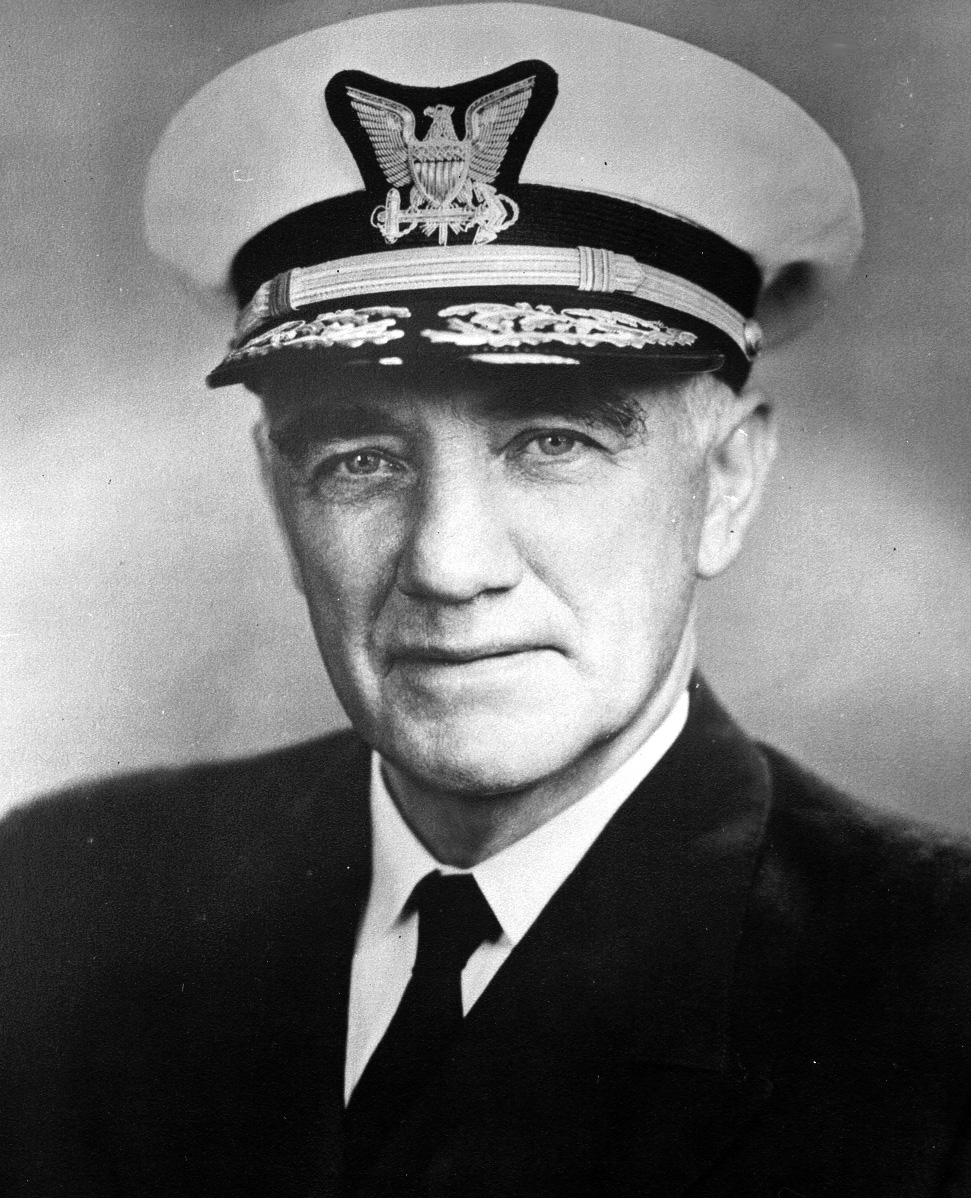
- Born: Edwin John Roland; 11 February 1905; Buffalo, New York, U.S.
- Died: 16 March 1985 (aged 80); St. Petersburg, Florida, U.S.
- Military career
- Allegiance: United States
- Branch: United States Coast Guard
- Rank: Admiral
- Commands: Commandant of the Coast Guard, USCGC Mackinaw (WAGB-83)

Edwin John Roland (11 February 1905 – 16 March 1985), was a United States Coast Guard admiral and served as the twelfth Commandant of the Coast Guard from 1962 to 1966. During his tenure, Roland oversaw the replacement of many World War II era cutters under fleet modernization programs. He also assisted the U.S. Navy with operations in Vietnam by supplying crews and cutters for Operation Market Time. Roland was noted for his support in efforts to bring international safety standards to merchant shipping. Although Roland was already retired when the Coast Guard was transferred from the Department of Treasury to the newly formed Department of Transportation in 1967, he was largely responsible for the planning for the move and the Coast Guard retaining its military responsibilities along with its transportation related functions.

== Early life and education ==
Roland was born and raised in Buffalo, New York. Growing up in Buffalo, he attended Canisius High School and later Canisius College in the city. He was accepted as a cadet at the United States Coast Guard Academy in 1926. While at the academy, he served as captain of the award-winning football squad, also playing on the baseball and basketball squads. He graduated from the Coast Guard Academy and was commissioned as an ensign on 15 May 1929.

== Career ==
=== United States Coast Guard ===
Following graduation from the academy, Roland reported aboard USCGC Shaw to serve as gunnery officer from 1929 to 1930 and as gunnery officer aboard USCGC Wilkes in 1930–1931. Shaw and Wilkes were a part of the destroyer force home-ported out of New London, Connecticut, and assigned the Rum Patrol. Roland was promoted 15 May 1931 to lieutenant (junior grade) and under his leadership, both cutters won gunnery trophies and he won a commendation for his contribution to the awards. In addition to his duties on the cutters, he was captain of the Coast Guard football squad that won the President's Cup in competition with teams from the Army, Navy and Marines in 1931. The President's Cup trophy was presented by Lou Henry Hoover, wife of President Herbert Hoover and accepted by Roland on behalf of the Coast Guard. In early 1932, he was in charge of target observation and repair for Destroyer Force cutters in the Gulf of Mexico and off Norfolk, Virginia. From September 1932 to 1934, he served as gunnery officer and navigator aboard USCGC Escanaba, based out of Grand Haven, Michigan. While serving aboard the Escanaba, Roland was promoted to lieutenant 15 May 1933.

Returning to the Coast Guard Academy in 1934, he served until 1938 as an instructor in physics and mathematics, and as assistant coach of the football, basketball, and baseball teams. During the summer of 1936, he participated in the summer practice cruise aboard USCGC Cayuga, assisting in the evacuation of Spanish Civil War refugees. In September 1938, Roland was assigned as the executive officer of USCGC Nemesis home-ported at St. Petersburg, Florida. He was later assigned duties as the commanding officer. In January 1940, he was transferred to New Orleans, Louisiana, to serve as the communications officer for the Eighth Coast Guard District and while serving in this capacity, he was promoted to lieutenant commander on 1 January 1942.

==== World War II ====
In May 1942, Roland was assigned to U.S. Coast Guard Headquarters as the Chief of the Enlisted Personnel Division at a time when the U.S. Coast Guard was expanding, growing from a small service of 25,000 men to a peak of over 175,000 personnel in 1944. While in this capacity Roland was promoted to commander. In October 1943, he was transferred to Task Force 60, a naval unit tasked with escorting convoys from the United States to Mediterranean ports; where he served as commander of the Escort Division. His flagship was the Coast Guard-crewed USS Vance. Roland was awarded the Navy Commendation Ribbon for meritorious service as commander. (Note: The Department of the Navy changed the Navy Commendation Ribbon to the Navy Commendation Medal in September 1960. In 1994 the name of the medal was changed to the Navy and Marine Corps Commendation Medal.)

From December 1944 to March 1946, he served as the first commanding officer of the newly commissioned USCGC Mackinaw, the first heavy-duty icebreaker built for Great Lakes service. For his meritorious service while commanding Mackinaw, he was awarded a Coast Guard Commendation Letter that cited him for icebreaking on an unprecedented scale while keeping shipping lanes open for both military and merchant vessels carrying urgently needed war supplies. (Note: Although the Commandant's Letter of Commendation Ribbon was not established until March 1979, Coast Guard Commendation Letters issued by the Commandant had been awarded since 12 August 1921. Awards are retroactive to that date.)

==== Post-war service ====
In April 1946, Roland moved to Cleveland, Ohio, as the Chief of Staff and Chief of the Operations Division of the Ninth Coast Guard District. He served in that capacity until June 1949 when he was named as commanding officer of USCGC Taney home-ported in San Francisco, California. While assigned to Taney, Roland was promoted to captain on 5 August 1949. In August 1950 he was transferred to the Coast Guard Academy as commandant of cadets where he served for the next four years. After a year of study at the National War College, Roland was assigned to Coast Guard Headquarters in the office of Chief of Staff in June 1955. On 16 March 1956 he assumed the position of Deputy Chief of Staff. Roland was nominated by President Dwight Eisenhower to be promoted to the rank of rear admiral. With confirmation by the Senate, he was promoted to flag rank effective 1 July 1956 and promptly assigned duties as commander, First Coast Guard District in Boston, Massachusetts. On 1 July 1960, Roland was assigned as both commander, Eastern Area; and commander, Third Coast Guard District at New York City.

On 1 February 1962, he received orders to report to Coast Guard Headquarters and on 12 February he was confirmed by the Senate as Assistant Commandant and promoted to vice admiral. New York City Mayor Robert F. Wagner presented Roland with the City of New York Medallion on 21 March for distinguished service as commander, Third Coast Guard District. On 23 April Roland was appointed by President John F. Kennedy as commandant of the Coast Guard and was promoted to the rank of admiral, both of which were confirmed by the Senate and made effective on 1 June 1962. (Note: Johnson discusses the reasons behind Roland's quick rise through the ranks from rear admiral to admiral on pages 318–319. They are beyond the scope of this article.) On 1 June 1962 Admiral Edwin J. Roland relieved Admiral Alfred C. Richmond as Commandant at change-of-command ceremonies held aboard USCGC Campbell moored in the Washington Navy Yard.

==== Commandant of the U.S. Coast Guard ====
===== Dillon Report =====
One of the first responsibilities that Roland undertook as commandant was to implement the recommendations of a staff report on U.S. Coast Guard roles and missions that was ordered by Secretary of the Treasury C. Douglas Dillon. The implementation of the study required many changes in assets and personnel during his tenure as commandant. As international air traffic increased during the 1950s and 1960s, the requirement for ocean station cutters and more efficient operation of AMVER required increases in personnel and spurred the service to invest in better cutters and aircraft that could be used in search and rescue work. The U.S. Coast Guard acquired additional responsibilities in March 1963 with an agreement with the Navy relating to icebreaking duties in Arctic and Antarctic research missions. In May 1965 the U.S. Coast Guard acquired the Navy's five icebreakers, but the requirements for additional personnel recruiting to man the icebreakers delayed the actual transfer of the ships. The first icebreaker could not be crewed until July and the last was not transferred until November 1966. On 9 July 1963, Roland received the Legion of Merit from Secretary Dillon in recognition of his outstanding record in maintaining a military readiness posture "unparalleled in the peacetime history of the Coast Guard". During Roland's tour as commandant, the U.S. Coast Guard plan for modernization of its fleet of medium and high endurance cutters was realized with the launching of the first acquisition of a major cutter since World War II. The medium endurance cutter USCGC Reliance was commissioned 20 June 1964.

===== Vietnam War =====
Roland served as commandant during the time that the Military Assistance Command, Vietnam (MACV) requested greater U.S. Navy involvement in interdiction of North Vietnamese troops and equipment into South Vietnam under Operation Market Time. The Navy did not have the patrol craft that would serve MACV's purposes and they requested assistance from the U.S. Coast Guard. Roland agreed to supply Point-class cutters and their crews to the operation, fearing that if the U.S. Coast Guard were left out of the Vietnam War that its standing as an armed service would be jeopardized. Coast Guard Squadron One was commissioned on 27 May 1965 and 17 cutters with their crews were assigned to Navy control and sent to Vietnam to assist with the mission of interdicting Communist vessels at sea and preventing personnel and supplies from entering South Vietnam. An additional nine Point-class cutters were assigned to Squadron One on 29 October at the request of MACV. The increased operations in Vietnam during Roland's time as commandant included buoy tenders to service Vietnamese aids to navigation. U.S. Coast Guard port security personnel were assigned at MACV's request after a visit to Vietnam by Roland in July 1965. There were additional manning requirements for new Loran-C radio stations for radio navigation of ships and aircraft. During the time of the Vietnam preparations he also managed the U.S. Coast Guard's response to the Camarioca boatlift operations in the Straits of Florida. In all, Roland oversaw the increase of over 3,500 additional personnel in 1966.

===== Department of Transportation transfer =====
During Roland's tenure as commandant, U.S. President Lyndon B. Johnson announced the formation of the Department of Transportation and its new role as overseer of all federal transportation related activities. Roland was informed that the U.S. Coast Guard would be one of the agencies transferred to the new department. Although Roland initially opposed the move, Johnson made it clear that he had the executive power to split the U.S. Coast Guard into two separate agencies and move all transportation responsibilities to the Department of Transportation and leave a much smaller U.S. Coast Guard within the Department of the Treasury. Roland withdrew his opposition to the proposed move and asked only that the U.S. Coast Guard not be stripped of its identity as an armed service.

===== International conferences and civilian honors =====
On 15 January 1965, Roland received Italy's highest award, the Commendatore (Knight Commander) of the Order of Merit of the Italian Republic, for the U.S. Coast Guard's many years of assistance to Centro-Internazionale Radio-Medico, a humanitarian organization which arranges medical first-aid at sea for injured and sick seamen. In March 1966, Roland represented the United States to the Load Line Conference on merchant ships held at London, England. In May he served as a delegate to the Maritime Safety Committee of International Maritime Consultative Organization (IMCO). The committee meeting reviewed merchant ship standards to prevent fires as occurred on board SS Yarmouth Castle. On 6 November 1965, he received the American Legion Distinguished Service Medal in which he was cited for outstanding contributions in chairing the Safety of Life at Sea subcommittee of the American Merchant Marine at the International Convention for the Safety of Life at Sea (SOLAS), as well as his contributions to IMCO and the establishment and expansion of AMVER to both Atlantic and Pacific Oceans.

== Awards and decorations ==
In addition to the Legion of Merit, Distinguished Service Medal, Commandant's Letter of Commendation, and the Navy Commendation Ribbon, Roland received the American Defense Service Medal, American Campaign Medal, European–African–Middle Eastern Campaign Medal, and World War II Victory Medal as well as the Expert Rifle and Expert Pistol Medals.

== Dates of rank ==
Ensign	Lieutenant, Junior Grade	Lieutenant	Lieutenant Commander	Commander	Captain
O-1	O-2	O-3	O-4	O-5	O-6
15 May 1929	15 May 1931	15 May 1933	1 January 1942	14 December 1942	5 August 1949

Commodore	Rear Admiral	Vice Admiral	Admiral
O-7	O-8	O-9	O-10
Never held	1 July 1956	12 February 1962	1 June 1962

== Later life and death ==
At change of command ceremonies held on 1 June 1966, Admiral Roland was relieved by the new commandant, Admiral Willard J. Smith, and Roland retired from the Coast Guard the same day. He was married to the former Jane Dare Fitch and had two sons, Edwin J. Roland Jr. and William F. Roland. Following his retirement as Coast Guard Commandant, he moved to Old Lyme, Connecticut, and died at the age of 80 while vacationing in St. Petersburg, Florida.

== See also ==
- Rum Patrol

== Notes ==
=== Citations ===
Military offices
Preceded by Alfred C. Richmond	Commandant of the Coast Guard; 1962–1966	Succeeded by Willard J. Smith
