= Alfred C. Richmond =

United States Coast Guard admiral (1902–1984)

Admiral Alfred C. Richmond
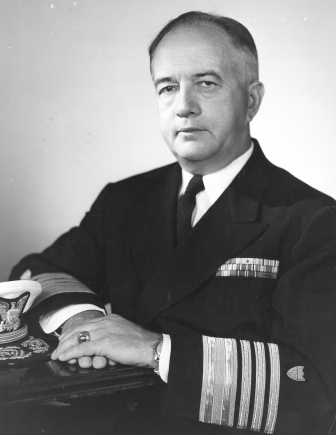
- Born: 18 January 1902; Waterloo, Iowa, US
- Died: 15 March 1984 (aged 82); Claremont, California, US
- Burial place: Arlington National Cemetery
- Military career
- Allegiance: United States
- Branch: United States Coast Guard
- Service years: 1922–1962
- Rank: Admiral
- Commands: Commandant
- Awards: Bronze Star; Coast Guard Distinguished Service Medal; Legion of Merit

Alfred Carroll Richmond (18 January 1902 – 15 March 1984) was an admiral of the United States Coast Guard who served as the 11th Commandant of the United States Coast Guard from 1954 to 1962, the second longest tenure of any U.S. Coast Guard Commandant following Russell R. Waesche who served from 1936 to 1946.

== Early life ==
Richmond was born 18 January 1902 in Waterloo, Iowa, and moved to Cherrydale neighborhood of Arlington, Virginia, with his family at the age of ten. After receiving a high school certificate from Massanutten Military Academy in Woodstock, Virginia, he entered the College of Engineering at George Washington University at the age of 16. While a student at George Washington University, he was employed at the United States Naval Observatory. He graduated from GWU in 1922, the same year he was appointed as a cadet at the United States Coast Guard Academy in New London, Connecticut.

== Early career ==
Upon graduating from the Academy in 1924, with senior man honors, Richmond was commissioned as an ensign on 1 October 1924 and assigned as an aide to Commandant Frederick C. Billard until September 1926 when he was appointed to the Coast Guard Academy staff. On 1 October 1926 he was promoted to lieutenant (junior grade). While at the Academy he participated in cadet summer practice cruises in 1927 aboard USCGC Mojave and in 1928 aboard USS Shaw. On 1 October 1928 Richmond was promoted to lieutenant and assigned as a student at Sperry Gyro Compass School at Brooklyn, New York. Upon graduation he was assigned a navigator aboard USCGC Pontchartrain, a newly delivered Lake-class cutter built at the Bethlehem Shipbuilding Corporation yards at Quincy, Massachusetts. In July 1930 he was transferred to USCGC Wainwright as the executive officer but was assigned in November to be the Coast Guard Representative at the Philadelphia Navy Yard while the USCGC Herndon was being readied for Rum Patrol duty. In May 1932, Richmond was reassigned to Coast Guard Headquarters with the assignment of assembling a Coast Guard marksmanship team at Camp Curtis Guild, Massachusetts that would compete at National Rifle Association matches held at Fort Sheridan, Illinois. After returning to Headquarters in August he was assigned as executive officer of USCGC Haida patrolling the waters of the Bering Sea and the Arctic Ocean. The newly reporting executive officer was promoted to lieutenant commander on 16 October 1932 and he continued to serve in that billet until being reassigned once again to Coast Guard Headquarters in September 1935. While working at headquarters, he enrolled at his alma mater, George Washington University as a law student. He graduated "with distinction" on 8 June 1938 with a Juris Doctor degree. The Coast Guard put Richmond's legal education to immediate use by assigning him duties in preparing law enforcement educational materials and assisting the Coast Guard Engineer-in-Chief with land records for property used by the Coast Guard. As the Coast Guard's first legal specialist he assisted in writing regulations for the recently formed Coast Guard Auxiliary, which at the time was known as the Coast Guard Reserve. (Note: The Coast Guard Auxiliary came into existence 23 June 1939 under the authority of the Coast Guard Reserve Act and was known by that name until the formation of the current Coast Guard Reserve on 19 February 1941.) During July 1939 he served as a representative of the Department of the Treasury and a delegate of the United States at the International Whaling Conference held at London, England.

== World War II service ==
In May 1941, Richmond was transferred to the Bethlehem Shipbuilding yard at Baltimore, Maryland, to supervise the outfitting of the new Coast Guard training vessel American Sailor, which was to be used for the training of U.S. Maritime Service personnel. (Note: The Coast Guard assumed the administration of the ships of the U.S. Maritime Service on 1 September 1938. The ships were crewed by Coast Guard personnel until 1 July 1942. The American Sailor was the former merchant ship Edgemont launched in April 1919 at the Skinner & Eddy shipyards at Seattle, Washington. She was decommissioned by the Coast Guard 31 August 1942 and returned to Maritime Service control.) He became the commanding officer when American Sailor was commissioned on 22 July 1941 and sailed her to the Maritime Service Training Station at Port Hueneme, California, where he also assumed command of the school in February 1942. Richmond was promoted to commander on 17 July 1942 while stationed at Port Hueneme. With the termination of Coast Guard control of Maritime Service ships on 1 September 1942, he received orders to report aboard the Haida once again as the commanding officer where he was responsible for convoy escort duty for ships taking troops and cargo to Alaska. In February 1943 he was directed to report to the Merchant Marine Inspection Office in New York where his duties included those of examining officer and hearing officer. Richmond was promoted to captain 1 June 1943 and in July was transferred to London, England. He was the Senior Coast Guard Officer in charge of the Merchant Marine Hearing Unit where he was responsible for administering and enforcing laws relating to the functions of Coast Guard vessels and personnel. He was also the hearing officer for accidents and casualties involving U.S. naval forces vessels and personnel in Europe. As the senior Coast Guard officer on the staff of the commander, U.S. Naval Forces in Europe he assisted in the organizing of Coast Guard assets used during Operation Overlord. For his part in planning the invasion, he received the Bronze Star Medal for meritorious service. The French government awarded him the Croix de Guerre "for exceptional services rendered in the liberation of France".

== Post-World War II assignments ==
In May 1945, Richmond was assigned to Coast Guard Headquarters serving as Supply Division Chief, Program Planning Division Chief, Planning and Budgets Division Chief, and Assistant Chief of the Planning and Control Division. During 1948 he undertook the additional assignment of chairing a committee that was charged with considering the recommendations of a study ordered by Congress on how the improve the operation of the Coast Guard and eliminate waste and extravagance. (Note: The report mandated by Congress was known as the "Ebasco Report" and was a study conducted by private contractor Ebasco Services, Inc. that began an investigation into Coast Guard operating practices in September 1947 and presented the finished report to Congress 21 January 1948. The report listed 193 recommendations for improving operations, some of which could be handled internally within the Coast Guard or the Treasury Department. Some of the recommendations required changes in laws that only Congress had the authority to modify.) As Chief of the Planning and Control Division in 1949, Richmond was responsible for the response to the recommendations of the Hoover Commission to transfer control of the Coast Guard from the Department of the Treasury to the Department of Commerce. He successfully demonstrated to the commission that there were no gains in economy or efficiency by such an action. On 9 March 1950, President Harry S. Truman appointed Richmond as Assistant Commandant of the Coast Guard with rank of rear admiral. The following year, he was given addition duties as Coast Guard Chief of Staff.

== Commandant ==
Richmond was appointed as Commandant of the Coast Guard by President Dwight D. Eisenhower 13 May 1954 as a vice admiral and took office 1 June, succeeding Vice Admiral Merlin O'Neill. One of his first concerns upon taking office was a proposal by Eisenhower to merge the Coast Guard Academy with the Department of Commerce Merchant Marine Academy. Again, Richmond was able to convince proponents of the move that there were no gains in economy and several impractical features to proposal by citing the differences in the military and commercial aspects of the academies. In 1956 Richmond's staff helped in the formation of the National Search and Rescue Plan which defined the Coast Guard's role and justified further developments in search and rescue (SAR) techniques by used by cutters and aircraft. Other developments during his first term as commandant included the coordinated use of non Coast Guard resources in oceanic SAR cases and the adoption of Loran-C used for navigation. Because of Richmond's rapport with members of Congress and a desire of the Eisenhower administration to continue improving SAR programs, he was appointed to a second term as Commandant and took office 1 June 1958. (Note: Richmond's rapport with Congress came from his experience as planning and budget chief at Coast Guard Headquarters and his legal background. He was responsible for presenting the Coast Guard's annual requests before Congressional budget committees beginning in 1946, a task he performed annually until his retirement 16 years later.) (Note: Several high profile rescues at sea occurred during Richmond's first term as commandant including the Andrea Doria. While the bulk of the Andrea Doria rescue was performed by civilian and navy vessels, it did point to the need for the establishment of a program to coordinate rescue efforts at sea by both military and civilian vessels and the eventual formation of AMVER which the Coast Guard administers.) Richmond was particularly active with international maritime conferences, representing the United States at the first assembly of the Intergovernmental Maritime Consultative Organization (IMCO) in January 1959 and four other occasions as head of the Maritime Safety Committee of IMCO. In 1960 he was head of the delegation to the Safety of Life at Sea Convention in London, for which services he was awarded the newly inaugurated Coast Guard Distinguished Service Medal. On 1 June 1960, he was promoted to admiral under the authority of Public Law 86-474, which required the commandant to hold the rank of admiral. In 1960 he was chosen to preside at the sixth International Lighthouse Conference and as president of the executive committee of the International Association of Lighthouse Authorities. In 1961, Richmond was again a delegate to the second assembly of IMCO as well as chairman of the National Committee for Prevention of Pollution of Seas by Oil.

== Retirement and personal life ==
Admiral Richmond was relieved by Admiral Edwin J. Roland in formal change-of-command ceremonies held aboard the USCGC Campbell on the Potomac River at Washington, DC, 31 May 1962 and officially retired from the Coast Guard on 1 June receiving a gold star in lieu of a second award of the Distinguished Service Medal for his "exceptionally meritorious service" as commandant from 1 June 1954 to 31 May 1962. He moved with his wife, Gretchen Campbell Richmond, to Claremont, California, where he served as a civil defense official for many years. He died of cancer 15 March 1984 at the age of 82 in Claremont and is buried alongside her at Arlington National Cemetery. Richmond was installed in the George Washington University Letterman Hall of Fame in November 1959 honoring his college letter in football. Richmond and his wife Gretchen were parents of two sons, John Mason Richmond and Alfred Carroll Richmond Jr.

== Dates of rank ==
Ensign	Lieutenant, Junior Grade	Lieutenant	Lieutenant Commander	Commander	Captain
O-1	O-2	O-3	O-4	O-5	O-6
October 1, 1924	October 1, 1926	October 1, 1928	October 16, 1932	July 14, 1942	June 1, 1943

Commodore	Rear Admiral	Vice Admiral	Admiral
O-7	O-8	O-9	O-10
Never held	March 10, 1950	June 1, 1954	June 1, 1960

== See also ==
- Rum Patrol

== Notes ==
Footnotes

Citations

References cited

- Historian's Office, U.S. Coast Guard. "Alfred C. Richmond, USCG". U.S. Coast Guard.
- Canney, Donald L. (1995). U.S. Coast Guard and Revenue Cutters, 1790–1935. Naval Institute Press, Annapolis. ISBN 978-1-55750-101-1.
- Johnson, Robert Irwin (1987). Guardians of the Sea, History of the United States Coast Guard, 1915 to the Present. Naval Institute Press, Annapolis. ISBN 978-0-87021-720-3.
- Scheina, Robert L. (1982). U.S. Coast Guard Cutters & Craft of World War II. Naval Institute Press, Annapolis. ISBN 978-0-87021-717-3.

Military offices
Preceded by Merlin O'Neill	Commandant of the Coast Guard; 1954–1962	Succeeded by Edwin J. Roland
Preceded by Merlin O'Neill	Assistant Commandant of the Coast Guard; 1949–1954	Succeeded by James A. Hirshfield
