= Willard J. Smith =

United States Coast Guard admiral (1914–2000)

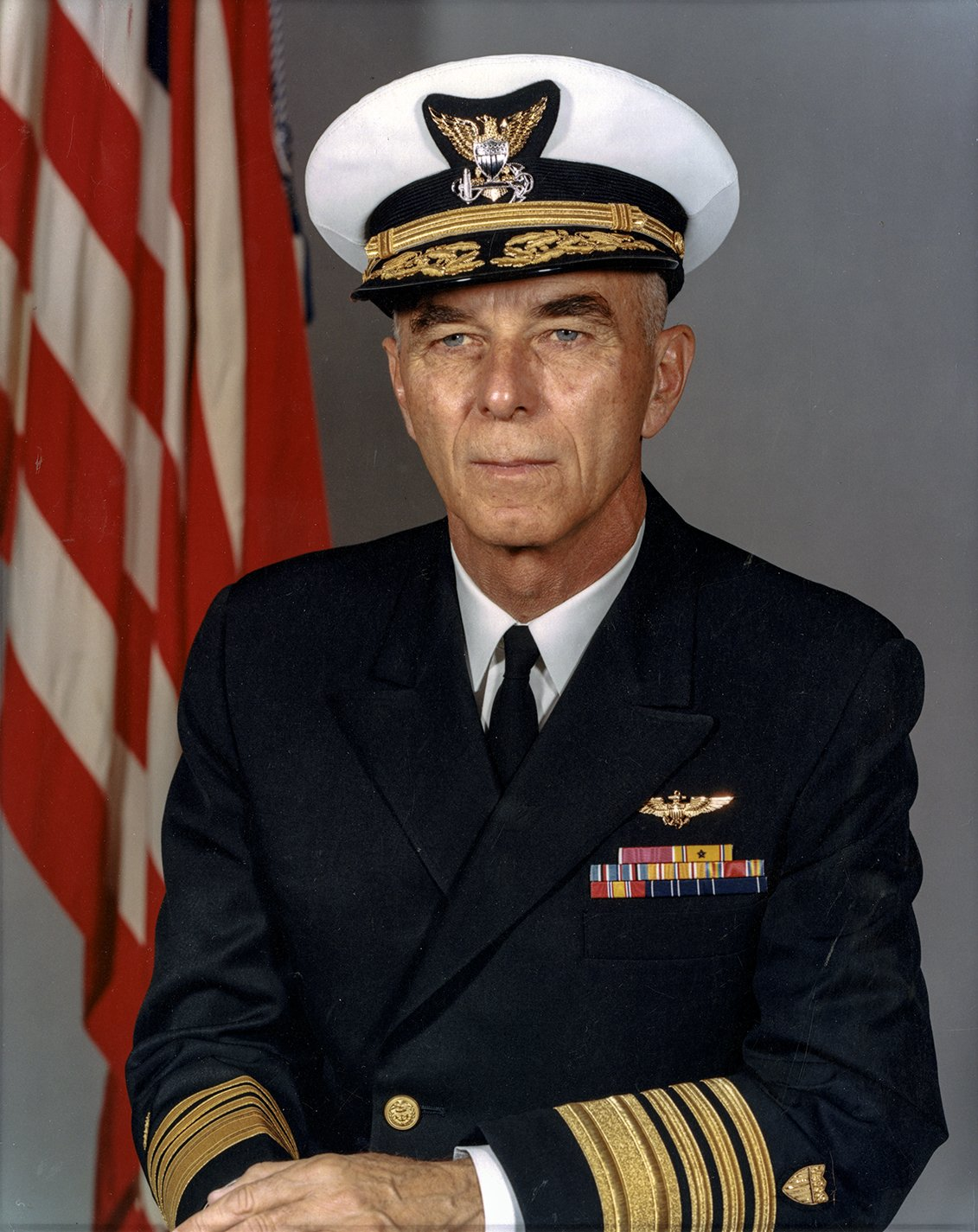
- Born: 14 May 1910; Suttons Bay, Michigan, US
- Died: 1 April 2000 (aged 89); Atlantic Beach, Florida, US
- Burial place: Arlington National Cemetery
- Military career
- Allegiance: United States
- Branch: United States Coast Guard
- Service years: 1933–70
- Rank: Admiral
- Commands: Commandant of the Coast Guard
- Awards: Coast Guard Distinguished Service Medal, Legion of Merit

Willard John Smith (May 14, 1910 – April 1, 2000) served as the 13th commandant of the United States Coast Guard from 1966 to 1970.

He was born in Suttons Bay, Michigan, and was the son of Oscar Smith, a retired commissioned warrant officer in the U.S. Coast Guard and his wife, Emma Bequist. Upon graduation from high school in Charlevoix, Michigan, he entered the University of Michigan, but later transferred to the United States Coast Guard Academy in New London, Connecticut.

Upon graduation from the academy in 1933, he was assigned to a Galveston, Texas-based Coast Guard cutter and later served as an aide to Commandant Russell R. Waesche from 1936 to 1939. During World War II, he was assigned to the Coast Guard's aviation branch and was responsible for the construction and commissioning of Coast Guard Air Station San Francisco, California, where he was assigned to duty until 1946. From 1946 to 1948, he served as commander of Coast Guard Air Station Traverse City, Michigan before his assignment as assistant chief of the Coast Guard's Aviation Division from 1948 to 1950. From 1950 to 1951, he attended the Armed Forces Staff College in Norfolk, Virginia. From 1962 to 1965, he served as superintendent of the United States Coast Guard Academy.

From 1965 until his appointment as commandant, he served as commander of the Cleveland, Ohio-based 9th Coast Guard District. As commandant in 1967, he oversaw the transfer of the Coast Guard from the United States Department of the Treasury to the United States Department of Transportation.

Upon completion of his service as Coast Guard Commandant in June 1970, he moved to Traverse City, Michigan. The following October, he was appointed as Assistant Secretary for Safety and Consumer Affairs at the United States Department of Transportation, serving under then-Secretary of Transportation John A. Volpe until July 1971, when he returned to Traverse City. In 1973 he became admiral of the Great Lakes Maritime Academy in Traverse City, Michigan and held the position until 1974.

He subsequently moved to Atlantic Beach, Florida, where his wife, the former Harriet A. Lary died on February 2, 2000, two months before he died, aged 89. His remains were interred alongside his late wife at Arlington National Cemetery. At the time of his death, he was the oldest-living former Coast Guard Commandant.

== Dates of rank ==
Ensign	Lieutenant, Junior Grade	Lieutenant	Lieutenant Commander	Commander	Captain
O-1	O-2	O-3	O-4	O-5	O-6
May 15, 1933	May 15, 1936	August 5, 1939	October 2, 1942	January 1, 1944	November 1, 1955

Commodore	Rear Admiral	Vice Admiral	Admiral
O-7	O-8	O-9	O-10
Never held	July 1, 1962	Never held	June 1, 1966

== Notes ==
=== Citations ===
- U.S. Coast Guard Historian's Office. "Willard J. Smith, USCG". Notable People. U.S. Coast Guard.
- Johnson, Robert Irwin (1987). Guardians of the Sea, History of the United States Coast Guard, 1915 to the Present. Naval Institute Press, Annapolis, Maryland. ISBN 978-0-87021-720-3.

Military offices
Preceded by Edwin J. Roland	Commandant of the Coast Guard; 1966–1970	Succeeded by Chester R. Bender
