= AMVER =

Nautical search and rescue system

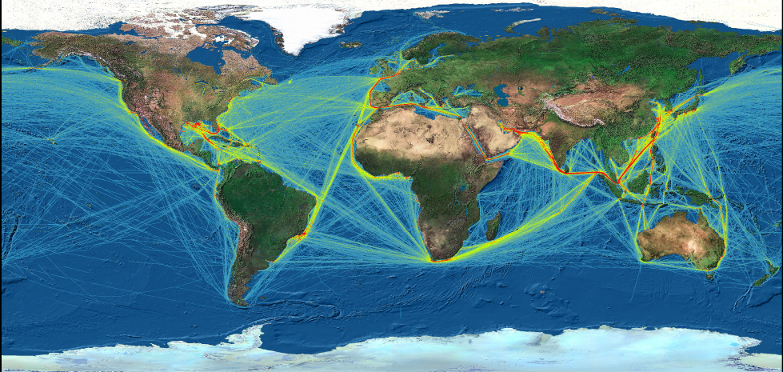
Density of AMVER reports, July 2011.

AMVER, or Automated Mutual-Assistance Vessel Rescue is a worldwide voluntary reporting system sponsored by the United States Coast Guard. It is a computer-based global ship-reporting system used worldwide by search and rescue authorities to arrange for assistance to persons in distress at sea. With AMVER, rescue coordinators can identify participating ships in the area of distress and divert the best-suited ship or ships to respond. Participating in AMVER does not put ships under any additional obligation to assist in search and rescue efforts, beyond that which is required under international law.

== History ==
The beginnings of the AMVER system finds its roots in the RMS Titanic disaster in 1912. Ships passing within sight of the ill-fated passenger liner were unaware that it had hit an iceberg and was sinking. Upon later investigation, those who had seen the distress flares from the stricken ship admitted they thought they were merely part of the maiden voyage celebrations. As late as the mid-twentieth century the world's commercial shipping fleet and burgeoning air transport system lacked an available full-time, global emergency reporting system.

On April 15, 1958, the United States Coast Guard and commercial shipping representatives began discussions which led to the creation of AMVER. Originally known as the Atlantic Merchant Vessel Emergency Reporting System, it became operational on July 18, 1958. AMVER began as an experiment, confined to waters of the North Atlantic Ocean, notorious for icebergs, fog and winter storms. Vice Admiral Alfred C. Richmond, Coast Guard Commandant at the time, called on all commercial vessels of U.S. and foreign registry, over 1,000 gross tons and making a voyage of more than 24 hours, to voluntarily become AMVER participants. The basic premise of AMVER, as a vehicle for mariner to help mariner without regard to nationality, continues to this day.

The first home of the AMVER Center was at the New York Custom House in downtown New York City, due to the fact that many commercial cargo and passenger lines operating in the Atlantic maintained offices nearby, and AMVER's success would depend on close ties to the merchant fleet. The system's first computer was an IBM RAMAC (Random Access Method Accounting Control), characterized as being able to "evaluate information and determine the position of vessels through dead reckoning." The product of the computer was a "Surface Picture" or "SURPIC" of an area of the ocean, indicating the AMVER participating ships in the vicinity. In 1966, the Coast Guard moved its regional headquarters from the Custom House to Governors Island, in upper New York Bay. The move included the AMVER Center and consolidated all New York area Coast Guard activities, including a Rescue Coordination Center, at one site. One year after the move, AMVER's title was revised to read Automated Merchant VEssel Reporting program. Subsequent homes for the AMVER computer would include Washington, D.C.; Governors Island, New York; and now at Martinsburg, West Virginia. In October 1982, the first joint AMVER/satellite-alerting rescue occurred, using the experimental ARGOS and Cospas-Sarsat system. December of that year saw the U.S. Maritime Administration and the Coast Guard sign an agreement making AMVER participation mandatory for U.S.-flag shipping, and suspending the requirement for the filing of reports to the overlapping USMER reporting system. This benefited many U.S. masters, already AMVER participants, who were juggling reports to two parallel systems, and allowed for a consolidated plot of all U.S. shipping worldwide. With the advent of the Global Maritime Distress Safety System (GMDSS), the role of AMVER was redefined to complement the emerging technology. Rescue coordination centers around the world began using Electronic Position Indicating Radio Beacons (EPIRBS), Inmarsat-C and Digital Selective Calling terminal auto-alarms to "take the search out of search and rescue." Then, attention could be turned to AMVER as a tool for the rescue phase of the operation. The beginning of the 1990s saw the need for the entire software package of AMVER to be rewritten in UNIX/Windows technology to keep pace with the evolution of data processing. This new version would provide more capacity; mechanisms for recurrent routings and maintaining ships on station (e.g., research ships or fishing factory ships); graphic plot depiction; and parser capability, once again bringing AMVER current with the state of the art. Home for the AMVER Center was moved to the Operations Systems Center, a new facility designed and built to consolidate many Coast Guard computer systems at Martinsburg, West Virginia. Contracted out to civilian operation, this facility released many staff members for reassignment throughout the Coast Guard. In conjunction with the National Oceanic and Atmospheric Administration (NOAA) and COMSAT (the U.S. signatory to Inmarsat) AMVER has assisted in the development of "compressed message" software to move report data at high speed and low cost to encourage more frequent, user-friendly reporting and thus increase plot accuracy at a time when many shipping companies are removing full-time radio officers from GMDSS-compliant ships. Today, over 22,000 ships from hundreds of nations participate in AMVER. An average of 4,000 ships are on the AMVER plot each day and those numbers continue to increase. The AMVER Center computer receives over 14,000 AMVER messages a day. Over 2,800 lives have been saved by AMVER participating ships since 2000.

== Types of AMVER reports ==
- Sailing Plan – contains complete routing information and should be sent within a few hours before, upon, or within a few hours after departure.
- Position Report – should be sent within 24 hours of departure and subsequently at least every 48 hours until arrival. The destination should also be included in Position Reports. At the discretion of the master, reports may be sent more frequently, for example: during heavy weather or other adverse conditions.
- Deviation Report – should be sent as soon as any voyage information changes, which could affect AMVER's ability to accurately predict the vessel's position. Changes in course or speed due to weather, ice, change in destination, or any other deviations from the original Sailing Plan should be reported as soon as possible.
- Arrival Report – should be sent upon arrival at the sea buoy or port of destination.

== See also ==
- Automatic identification system
