= Merlin O'Neill =

American military man

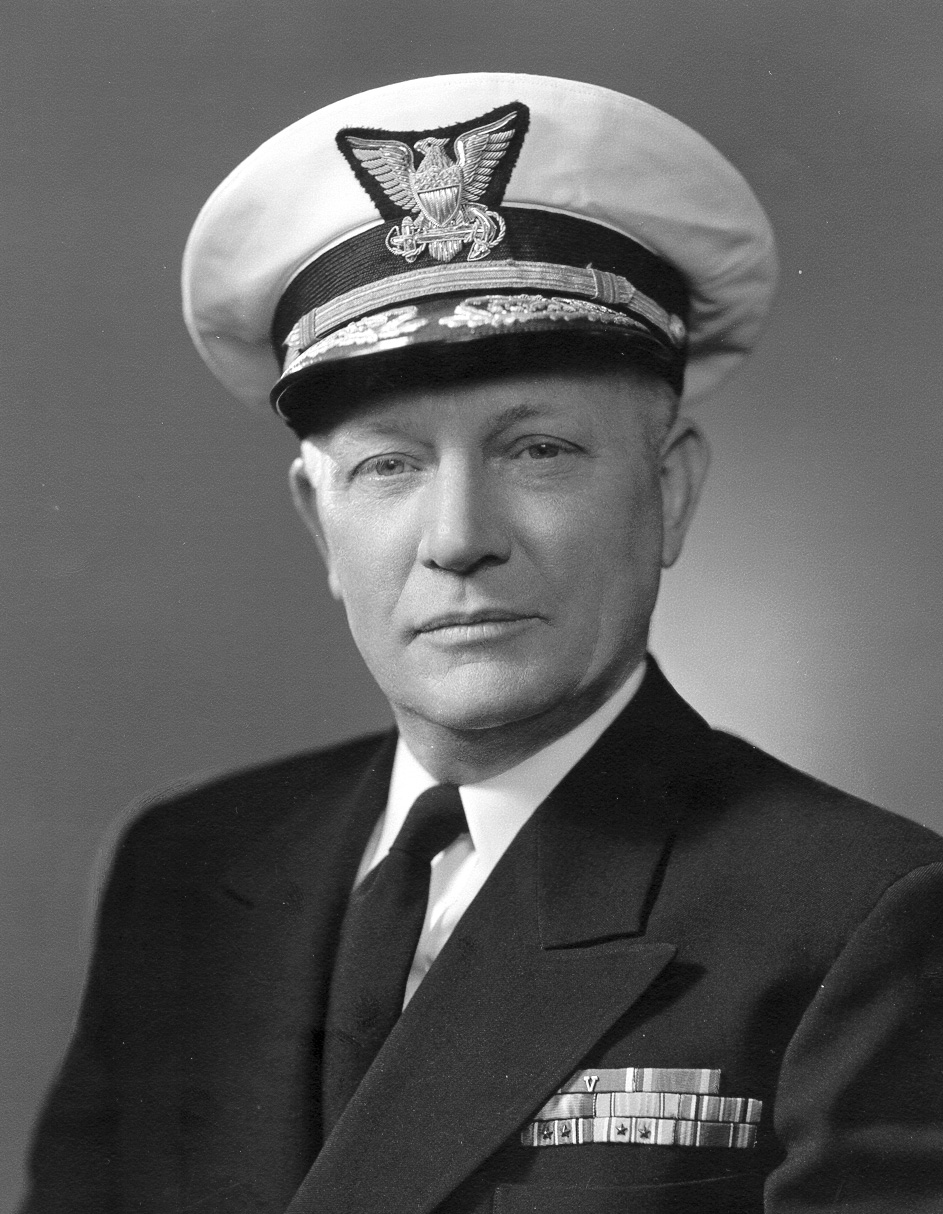
- Born: 30 October 1898; North Kenova, Ohio, U.S.
- Died: 1 March 1981 (aged 82); Naval Air Station Patuxent River, Maryland, U.S.
- Military career
- Allegiance: United States
- Branch: United States Coast Guard
- Service years: 1921–1954
- Rank: Admiral (Note: O'Neill retired with the rank of admiral, 1 June 1954, six years before his statutory retirement age.)
- Commands: Commandant of the Coast Guard
- Conflicts: World War II
- Awards: Legion of Merit

Merlin O'Neill (30 October 1898 – 1 March 1981) served as the tenth Commandant of the United States Coast Guard from 1 January 1950 to 1 June 1954.

Born in North Kenova, Ohio, in 1898, O'Neill was commissioned in the United States Coast Guard in 1921. He served on a number of vessels, including his first command, the USS Ericsson. In 1927, he began a three-year period as an instructor at the United States Coast Guard Academy before returning to sea in command of the USCGC Monaghan, in 1930. From 1935, he held a number of positions at Coast Guard Headquarters. During World War II he participated in Allied amphibious landings in Morocco and Sicily. He served as Assistant Commandant from 1946 until his appointment as Commandant of the Coast Guard in 1950 and retired in 1954 with the rank of admiral.

== Early life and education ==
O'Neill was born in North Kenova, Ohio, on 30 October 1898. He graduated from Morgan City High School in Morgan City, Louisiana, and then attended Western Kentucky State Normal School in 1916 and 1917. While preparing for the United States Coast Guard Academy entrance examinations O'Neill attended the Marion Military Institute in Marion, Alabama. He was appointed a cadet at the Academy in July 1918 and in March 1921, he graduated and was commissioned as a Coast Guard ensign.

== Career ==
Newly commissioned as an ensign, O'Neill reported aboard the USCGC Gresham, homeported at New York City for his first assignment in April 1921. While assigned to the Gresham he was promoted to lieutenant junior grade on 14 November 1921. In April 1922 he transferred to Seattle, Washington, to serve aboard the USCGC Haida whose primary area of operation was in the Bering Sea. O'Neill participated in two long Bering Sea patrols while assigned to the Haida before transferring to the USCGC Algonquin in 1924. Algonquin also patrolled the Bering Sea and O'Neill served one long patrol before returning to the Atlantic coast. He served a short time aboard the USCGC Mojave before being detailed to the Philadelphia Navy Yard to help with the conversion of the U.S. Navy destroyer USS Ericsson to Coast Guard duty for the suppression of smuggling. After Ericsson was commissioned in May 1925, O'Neill was assigned as the executive officer. He was promoted to lieutenant on 10 September 1925 while continuing to serve as the cutter's executive officer. O'Neill assumed command of Ericsson for a short time before he was assigned to the Coast Guard Academy staff as an instructor in September 1927. He was promoted to lieutenant commander on 7 March 1929.

In November 1929, O'Neill assumed the responsibilities of commandant of cadets at the academy and included three summer practice cruises with the cadets in his schedule. After leaving the academy in October 1930, he became commanding officer of three cutters in quick succession in three years; USCGC Monaghan, USCGC Herndon, and USCGC Cassin were assigned to the Rum Patrol for anti-smuggling operations. In June 1933 he was assigned to the command of the USCGC Apache which patrolled Chesapeake Bay and the Potomac River. O'Neill's next assignment in October 1935, took him to Coast Guard Headquarters in Washington, D.C., where he worked in the Office of Operations. As a part of his headquarters assignment in June 1937 he attended the International Whaling Conference in London, England, as a technical advisor to the United States delegation. Additionally in 1939, he was appointed as the first chief director of the newly formed civilian Coast Guard Auxiliary, which was at the time known as the Coast Guard Reserve. While serving as chief director of the auxiliary he was promoted to commander on 25 May 1940. O'Neill continued to serve as auxiliary chief until October 1942.

=== World War II ===
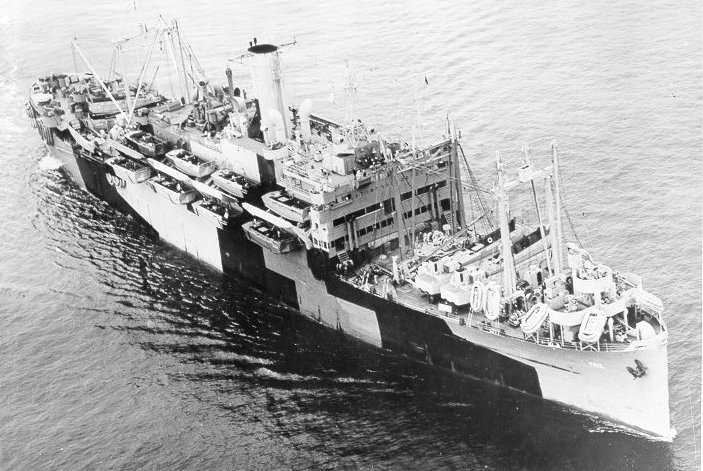
USS Leonard Wood (APA-12)

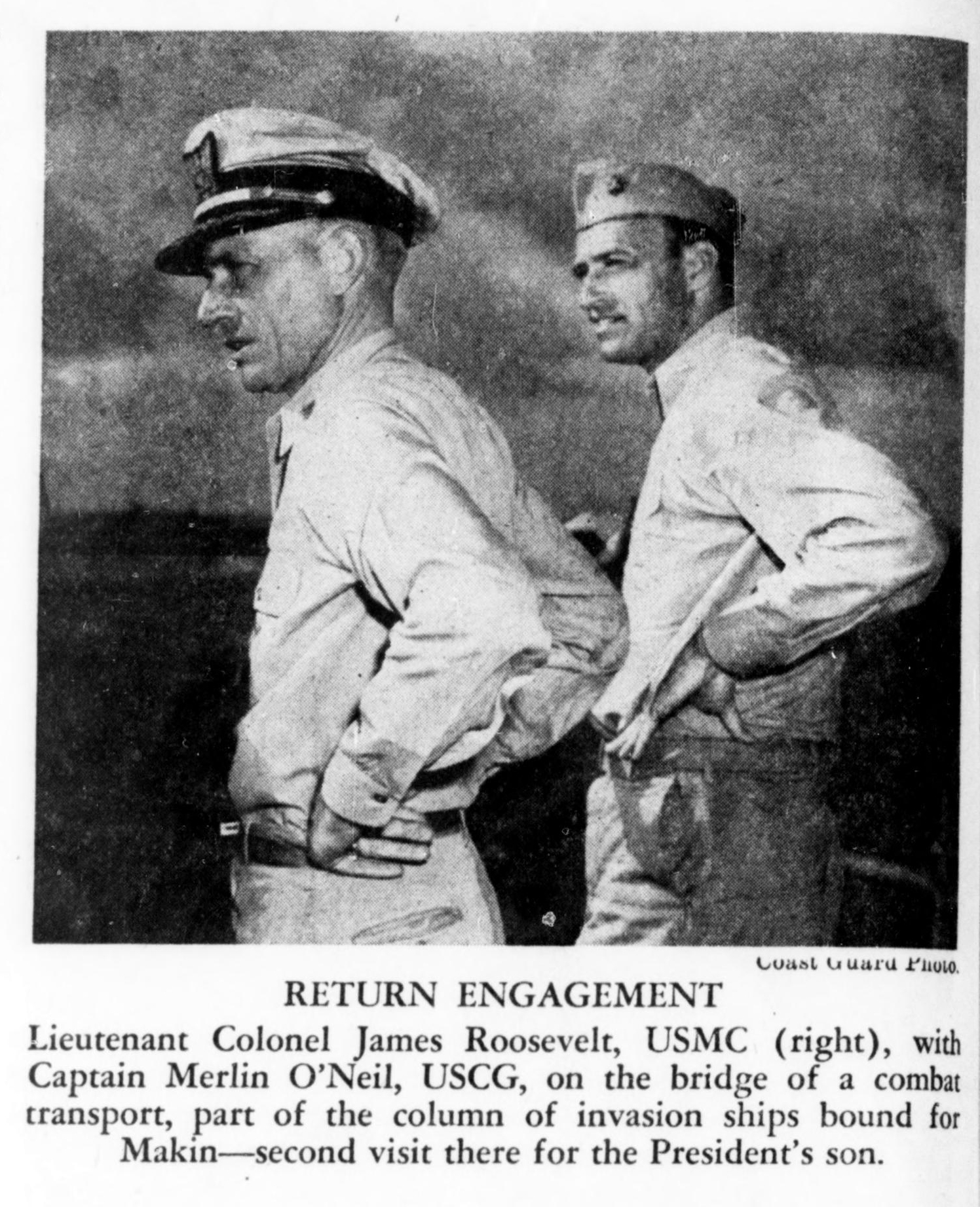
O'Neill (left) with James Roosevelt in the Marine Corps Gazette, February 1944

In October 1942, O'Neill assumed command of the Coast Guard manned Harris-class attack transport USS Leonard Wood which was practicing landings at Hampton Roads, Virginia, for the invasion of North Africa. Leonard Wood departed Hampton Roads on 24 October and participated in the landings at Fedhala, French Morocco, on 7 November. In late November, Leonard Wood returned to the United States for repairs and training. While at Norfolk Naval Shipyard, O'Neill was promoted to captain on 10 December 1942. As skipper of Leonard Wood O'Neill also participated in the Allied invasion of Sicily in July 1943, where he was awarded the Legion of Merit for exceptionally meritorious conduct in the performance of outstanding services during the landings. After Leonard Wood was transferred to the Pacific theater, O'Neill participated in the landings in the Gilbert Islands in November 1943 and Marshall Islands in February 1944. He was transferred in July 1944 to Camp Lejeune, North Carolina, as the commanding officer of the Coast Guard Amphibious Training Unit, but a month later he received orders assigning him to head the Baltimore Section of the Fifth Coast Guard District. Early in 1945, he was assigned to Coast Guard Headquarters as the Assistant Chief of the Finance and Supply Division. On 1 June 1945, O'Neill was promoted to commodore and assigned as Commander, Fifth Coast Guard District.

=== Commandant ===
On 1 February 1946, O'Neill was appointed Assistant Commandant with the accompanying rank of rear admiral by President Truman and served in that position until the Commandant, Admiral Joseph F. Farley retired on 31 December 1949. He had been nominated by Truman for the post of Commandant on 12 October 1948 and the Senate confirmed the nomination two days later. O'Neill assumed the office of Commandant on 1 January 1950 with the rank of vice-admiral.

With the outbreak of the Korean War in June 1950 and the passage of the Magnuson Act, the Coast Guard became responsible for the security of all of the nation's ports and harbors. Because the U.S. Coast Guard Reserve had been allowed to lapse after World War II, O'Neill called for the reformation of the reserve program to help with the port security mission and Congress granted the funds for training an effective reserve component. Under his direction, 35 Organized Reserve Training Units, Port Security (ORTUPS) were established at larger seaports for security assignments and two Organized Reserve Training Units, Vessel Augmentation were formed at Boston and Washington, D.C., to train officers for assignment to cutters should it become necessary. While O'Neill was commandant, the active duty strength of the Coast Guard increased by 6,000 personnel to 29,000 and the reserve strength numbered 8,300. Under O'Neill's stewardship, the reorganization of the Coast Guard started by Commandant Farley was completed; this put into effect a system of comptroller functions that oversaw the financial affairs, centralized record-keeping, and standardized reports and forms. The positions of chief of staff and deputy chief of staff were also established to assist the commandant with the management of the organization.

== Later life and death ==
O'Neill retired from the U.S. Coast Guard on 1 June 1954 with the rank of admiral. His decorations included the Legion of Merit, awarded for exceptionanally meritorious conduct during the invasion of Sicily. After retiring from active duty Admiral O'Neill resided in Lusby, Maryland. O'Neill died of cardiac arrest 1 March 1981 at the Naval Hospital at Patuxent River Naval Air Station. He was survived by his wife, Esther, and two daughters. The Admiral Merlin O’Neill Award was established by the Military Officers Association of America Southern Maryland Chapter at the behest of O'Neill's widow, Mrs. Esther O’Neill. O’Neill, who was recognized for his interest in the development and recognition of junior officers, moved to southern Maryland after his retirement and lived in the area until his death in 1981.

== Dates of rank ==
Ensign	Lieutenant, Junior Grade	Lieutenant	Lieutenant Commander	Commander	Captain
O-1	O-2	O-3	O-4	O-5	O-6
March 1921	November 14, 1921	September 10, 1925	March 7, 1929	May 25, 1940	December 10, 1942

Commodore	Rear Admiral	Vice Admiral	Admiral
O-7	O-8	O-9	O-10
June 1, 1945	February 1, 1946	January 1, 1950	June 1, 1954 (upon retirement)

== See also ==
- Rum Patrol
- United States Coast Guard Auxiliary
- United States Coast Guard Reserve

== Notes ==
Footnotes

Citations

Military offices
Preceded by Joseph F. Farley	Commandant of the Coast Guard; 1949–1954	Succeeded by Alfred C. Richmond
Preceded by Lloyd T. Chalker	Assistant Commandant of the Coast Guard; 1946–1949	Succeeded by Alfred C. Richmond
