= USCGC Campbell =

USCGC Campbell may refer to more than one United States Coast Guard ship.

- Revenue Schooner Campbell, named for George Washington Campbell, Treasury Secretary, in service 1830 – 1834
- Revenue Schooner Campbell, named for George Washington Campbell, Treasury Secretary, in service 1834 – 1839
- Revenue Cutter Campbell, named for George Washington Campbell, Treasury Secretary, in service 1848 –
- Revenue Cutter Campbell, named for James Campbell, Postmaster General, in service 1853 – 1875, sold to merchant service as Pedro Varela
- USCGC Campbell (WPG-32), named for George Washington Campbell, Treasury Secretary, in service 1936 – 1982, sunk as target 1984
- USCGC Campbell (WMEC-909), Famous-class cutter, named for preceding Coast Guard ships of the same name, in service since 1988

== Sources ==
- United States Coast Guard, USCGC Campbell History, http://www.uscg.mil/lantarea/cgcCampbell/history.asp, retrieved 2/15/2011
- United States Department of Commerce, Merchant Vessels of the United States, USG, 1889
