= USCGC Haida =

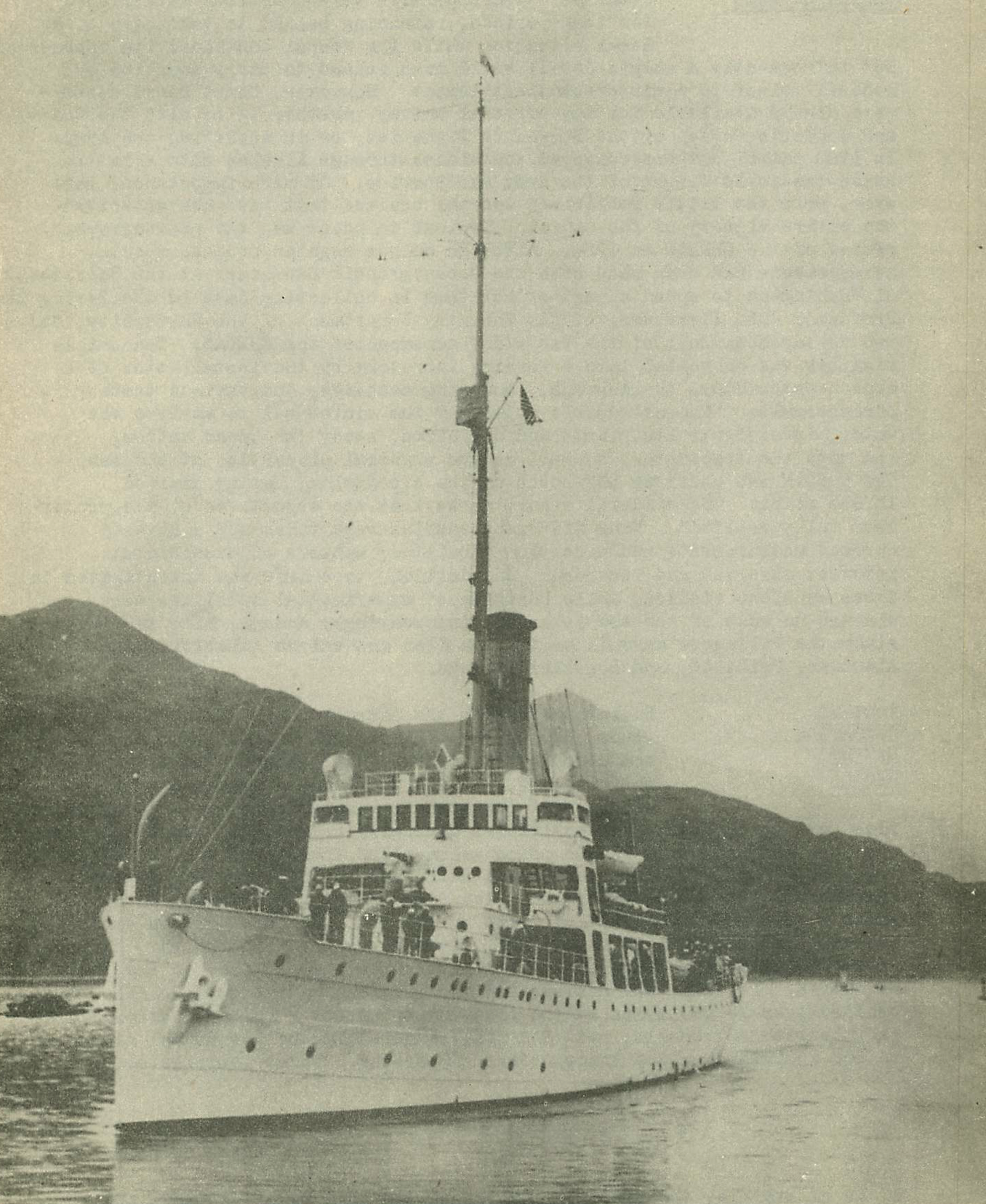
- USCGC Haida

History

United States
- Name: USCGC Haida (WPG-45)
- Namesake: Haida
- Builder: Union Construction Company, Oakland, California
- Cost: $775,000
- Laid down: 27 September 1920
- Commissioned: 26 October 1921
- Decommissioned: 13 February 1947
- Fate: Sold, 20 January 1948; Scrapped, 1951

General characteristics (1945)
- Class & type: Tampa-class cutter
- Displacement: 1,955 long tons (1,986 t)
- Length: 240 ft (73 m)
- Beam: 39 ft (12 m)
- Draft: 13 ft 2 in (4.01 m)
- Propulsion: 1 × General Electric 2.040 kVa motor with turbo generator; 2 × Babcock & Wilcox cross-drum 200 psi boilers; 1 × Propeller
- Speed: 15.5 knots (28.7 km/h; 17.8 mph)
- Range: 5,500 nmi (10,200 km; 6,300 mi) at 9 kn (17 km/h; 10 mph)
- Complement: 96
- Sensors & processing systems: SA radar; SL radar; QCJ-3 sonar
- Armament: 1921: 2 × 5"/51 caliber guns; 2 × 6-pounder; 1 × 1-pounder gun; 1942: 2 × 5"/51 caliber guns; 1 × 3"/50 caliber gun; 2 × .50 caliber machine guns; 4 × Y-gun depth charge projectors; 2 × depth charge tracks; 1943: 2 × 3"/50 caliber guns; 4 × 20 mm/80 guns; 2 × Mousetrap ASW; 4 × Y-gun depth charge projectors; 2 × depth charge tracks

USCGC Haida (WPG-45) was a 240-foot (73 m) Tampa-class United States Coast Guard cutter in commission from 1921 until 1947.

== Ship history ==
The ship was laid down at the Union Construction Company in Oakland, California, on 27 September 1920. She was launched on 19 April 1921, christened by Mrs. Frank G. Law, and commissioned on 4 October 1921.

Haida was first stationed at Seattle, Washington, before joining the Bering Sea Patrols, based from Unalaska, Alaska. Her duties included providing medical services, search and rescue, maintaining aids to navigation, fishery patrols, and attempts to enforce Prohibition regulations. In 1924 she supported the U.S. Army's circumnavigation of the globe by air.

On 7 December 1941 Haida was undergoing repairs at the Puget Sound Navy Yard. She returned to duty in Alaskan waters in early 1942, carrying out escort and rescue duties. She was assigned to weather ship duty in 1943, which continued through until March 1946.

Haida was decommissioned on 13 February 1947, and sold in 1948 to the Puget Sound Bridge and Dredging Company. She was scrapped in 1951.

== See also ==
- List of United States Coast Guard cutters
