= List of United States Coast Guard tombstone vice admirals =

This is a list of tombstone vice admirals in the United States Coast Guard. A tombstone promotion transferred an officer to the retired list with the rank and sometimes the pay of the next higher grade. More than a dozen rear admirals received tombstone promotions to vice admiral when they retired, for either completing 40 years of service or being specially commended for performance of duty in actual combat before the end of World War II. Tombstone promotions for years of service ended on November 1, 1949, and for combat citations on November 1, 1959.

== List of U.S. Coast Guard tombstone vice admirals ==
A tombstone vice admiral's date of rank was the date he retired. The Coast Guard made no distinction on the retired list between tombstone vice admirals and vice admirals who achieved that rank before retiring, unlike the Navy, which gave precedence to retired officers who had served on active duty in a grade over those who only received a tombstone promotion to that grade.

=== Forty years of service ===
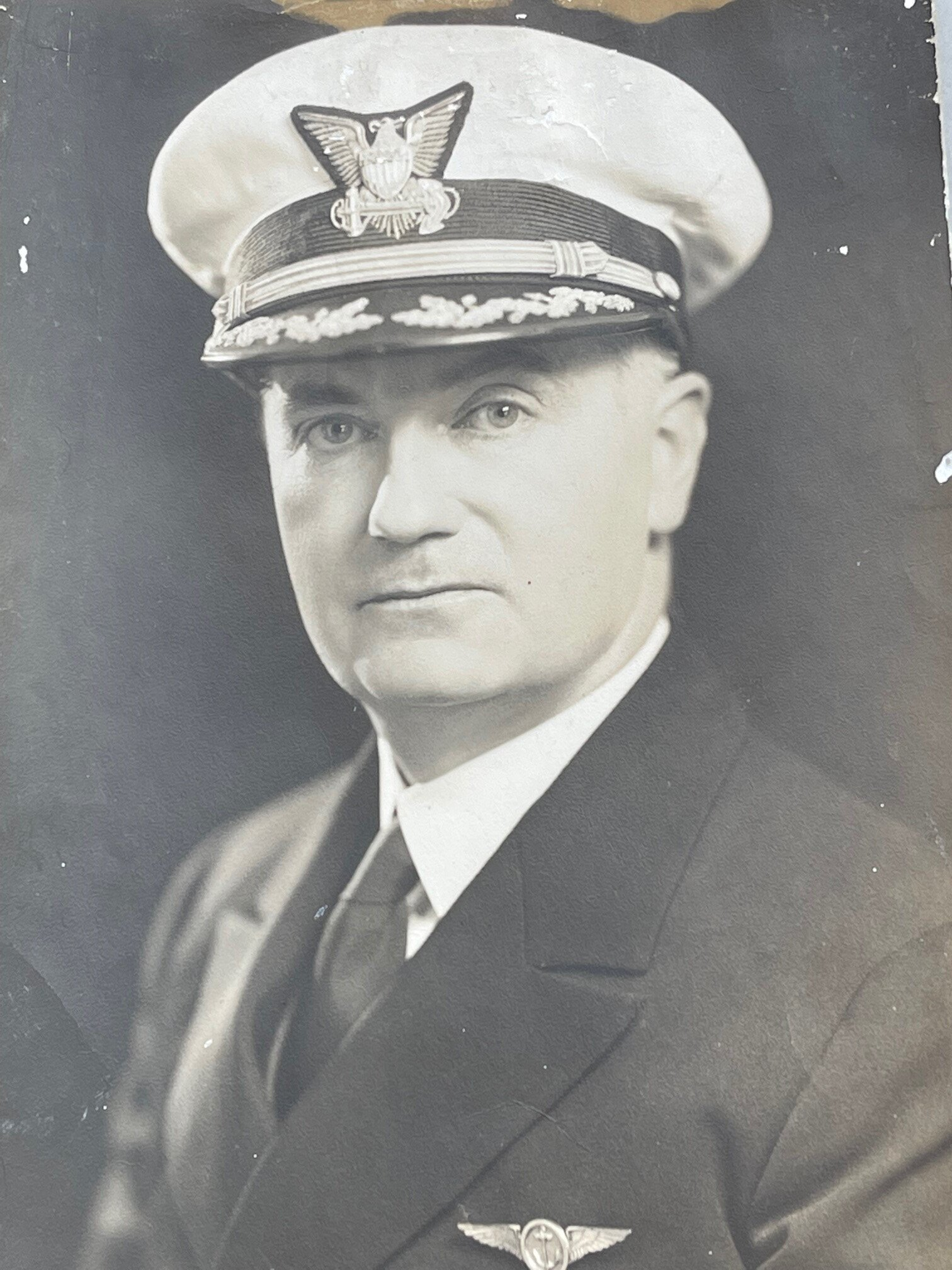
Lloyd T. Chalker

From 1923 to 1949, Coast Guard officers could retire with the rank and retired pay of the next higher grade if they had at least 40 years of service, including time as a cadet, although the retired pay for a vice admiral was the same as for a rear admiral (upper half).

The promotion was meant as an incentive for officers to complete a full 40-year career in the Coast Guard, which was so small in 1923 that its only flag officer was the commandant of the Coast Guard. Even the commandant held only the ex officio rank of rear admiral and reverted to his permanent grade of captain upon leaving office, so a tombstone promotion was the only way Coast Guard officers could retire with the same rank and pay as line officers with comparable length of service in the much larger Navy. A similar incentive had long been offered to Navy staff corps officers, who could retire in the grade of commodore after 40 years.

The first two commandants to retire after 1923 each had more than 40 years of service but did not receive tombstone promotions to vice admiral because that grade did not exist in the Coast Guard until March 1942, when the incumbent commandant, Russell R. Waesche, was promoted to temporary vice admiral. On July 1, 1946, Lloyd T. Chalker became the second Coast Guard officer to achieve three-star rank when he retired as a vice admiral after more than 40 years of service. Former commandant Harry G. Hamlet and former assistant commandant Leon C. Covell had both retired before the vice admiral grade was established, and subsequently received tombstone promotions to that grade, ranking from their retirement dates.

Flag grades were established in the Coast Guard in 1947, giving its officers the same promotion opportunities as their Navy counterparts, so Congress repealed the tombstone promotion for years of service, effective November 1, 1949. Even after that date, Wilfrid N. Derby and Joseph E. Stika were still able to retire as vice admirals because they had already accumulated 40 years of service prior to the repeal.

Name	Date retired as vice admiral	Commission	Notes
Harry G. Hamlet	1 Sep 1938	1896 (USRCSSI)	(1874–1954) Commandant of the Coast Guard, 1932–1936.
Leon C. Covell	1 Jan 1942	1902 (USRCSSI)	(1877–1960)
Lloyd T. Chalker	1 Jul 1946	1903 (USRCSSI)	(1883–1981)
Edward D. Jones	1 Oct 1946	1906 (USRCSSI)	(1885–1954)
James Pine	1 Aug 1947	1908 (USRCSSI)	(1885–1953)
Thomas A. Shanley	1 Sep 1947	1907 (USRCSSI)	(1885–1965)
Stanley V. Parker	1 Nov 1947	1906 (USRCSSI)	(1885–1968)
Gordon T. Finlay	1 Jun 1948	1909 (USRCSSI)	(1886–1965)
William K. Scammell	1 Apr 1949	1911 (USRCSSI)	(1889–1965)
Wilfrid N. Derby	1 Sep 1950	1911 (USRCSSI)	(1889–1973)
Joseph E. Stika	1 Oct 1951	1910 (USRCSSI)	(1889–1976)

=== Combat citations before the end of World War II ===
From 1942 to 1959, officers of the maritime services—Navy, Marine Corps, Coast Guard, and Coast and Geodetic Survey—could retire with the rank but not the pay of the next higher grade, if they were specially commended for the performance of duty in actual combat before the end of World War II.

The Coast Guard claimed that a tombstone promotion for combat citations was a two-step process that first placed an officer on the retired list in his final active-duty rank, and then advanced him to a higher grade on the retired list; whereas a tombstone promotion for years of service placed an officer on the retired list directly in the higher grade, a distinction that justified the retired pay of the higher grade for the second type of tombstone promotion, which was only available in the Coast Guard.

Tombstone promotions for combat citations were halted on November 1, 1959.

Name	Date retired as vice admiral	Commission	Notes
Lyndon Spencer	1 Nov 1946	1918 (USCGA)	(1898–1981)
Roy L. Raney	1 Aug 1956	1924 (USCGA)	(1900–1991)
Raymond J. Mauerman	1 Jul 1957	1922 (USCGA)	(1898–1987)
Russell E. Wood	14 May 1959	1924 (USCGA)	(1903–1981)
Kenneth K. Cowart	1 Jul 1959	1926 (USCGA)	(1905–1996)
Harold C. Moore	1 Oct 1959	1926 (USCGA)	(1901–1981)

== Legislative history ==
The following list of Congressional legislation includes all acts of Congress pertaining to appointments to the grade of vice admiral in the United States Coast Guard before 1960.

Each entry lists an act of Congress, its citation in the United States Statutes at Large, and a summary of the act's relevance.

Legislation	Citation	Summary
Act of January 12, 1923	42 Stat. 1130; 42 Stat. 1131	Authorized commandant the rank and pay of rear admiral (lower half).; Authorized officers with 40 years of service to retire with the rank and retired pay of the next higher grade.
Act of April 23, 1930	46 Stat. 253	Authorized commandant the same rank and pay as a Navy bureau chief (i.e. rear admiral (upper half)).
Act of June 25, 1936	49 Stat. 1924	Authorized commandant serving after June 1, 1936, to retire with the pay of rear admiral (upper half).
Act of June 6, 1942	56 Stat. 328	Authorized officers who were specially commended for performance of duty in actual combat, to be placed on the retired list with the rank of the next higher grade and three-fourths of the active-duty pay of the grade in which serving at the time of retirement.
Act of February 21, 1946	60 Stat. 28	Authorized officers to be placed on the retired list with the rank and three-fourths of the active-duty pay of the highest temporary grade in which they served satisfactorily on or before June 30, 1946.
Act of August 4, 1949	63 Stat. 516; 63 Stat. 561	Reauthorized officers who were specially commended for performance of duty in actual combat, to be placed on the retired list with the rank of the next higher grade and three-fourths of the active-duty pay of the grade in which serving at the time of retirement, unless the duty was performed after December 31, 1946.; Repealed authorization for officers with 40 years of service to retire with the rank and retired pay of the next higher grade, effective November 1, 1949.
Act of August 3, 1950	64 Stat. 406	Repealed authorization for officers who were specially commended for performance of duty in actual combat, to retire with three-fourths of the active-duty pay of the grade in which serving at the time of retirement.
Act of August 11, 1959	73 Stat. 338	Repealed authorization for officers who were specially commended for performance of duty in actual combat, to retire with the rank of the next higher grade, effective November 1, 1959.

== See also ==
- Vice admiral (United States)
- List of United States Coast Guard vice admirals
- List of United States Navy tombstone vice admirals
- List of United States Marine Corps tombstone lieutenant generals
