= Plucking board =

U.S. military selection board for involuntary separation of officers

A plucking board is a selection board convened in the United States Armed Forces to identify officers for involuntary retirement or separation. To "pluck" an officer is to remove that officer from the active list or from the line of promotion, typically to clear stagnant promotion flow caused by seniority-based advancement and to make room for younger or more capable officers. The term originated in the United States Navy with the Navy Personnel Act of 1899 and was later applied to a comparable United States Army body established under George C. Marshall during the prewar mobilization of 1940–1941.

== Naval origin (1899) ==
Before 1900, promotion in the U.S. Navy was governed almost entirely by seniority, with the result that officers could remain in a single grade for a decade or more and frequently reached the upper ranks only shortly before mandatory retirement at age 62. To relieve this stagnation, the Navy Personnel Act of 1899 (Act of March 3, 1899) created annual boards of admirals empowered to "select out" a fixed number of the officers they judged least efficient—professionally, physically, or morally—and place them on the retired list. These bodies became known informally as "plucking boards."

To soften the stigma of forced retirement, an officer removed by a plucking board was advanced one grade on the retired list, an early form of tombstone promotion. Where voluntary retirements occurred—often induced by that one-grade incentive—the number of officers plucked was reduced correspondingly.

The plucking boards were unpopular within the service almost from the outset, being remembered as the "thrice-damned" boards by their critics. They produced enough resentment among affected officers, some of whom carried their grievances to Congress, that the system was eventually repealed. It was replaced by the "selection-up" principle contained in the promotion legislation of 1916, which advanced the most able officers rather than removing the least able.

== Army application (1940–1941) ==
When George C. Marshall became Chief of Staff of the United States Army on September 1, 1939, Army promotion below brigadier general still operated by seniority alone, and a large cohort of officers who had entered during World War I—known as the "hump"—had slowed advancement throughout the officer corps. The existing means of removing unfit Regular officers, the "Class B" reclassification procedure of the National Defense Act, was slow and easily appealed: across 1936–1940 only 37 officers were finally removed under it, an average of about 7.4 per year against an officer corps of roughly 14,000.

In late August 1940, the Army's G-1 personnel division recommended pairing selective promotion with "a more effective system of elimination," proposing a single board of general officers empowered to recommend removal "for any reason deemed by it to be good and sufficient," with the affected officer facing honorable discharge one year after removal. The enabling legislation was enacted as Public Law 190 on July 29, 1941, placing dismissal authority in the hands of the Secretary of War.

The body went through several names—initially the Removal Board, then the Appointment Board, and ultimately the War Department Personnel Board—but was popularly known as the plucking board or "plucking committee." It was chaired by Malin Craig, Marshall's predecessor as Chief of Staff, who was recalled to active duty for the purpose. The governing policy statement, which bears Marshall's initials, directed that the board judge an officer not on past achievement but on present fitness: "It is not the function of the board to determine how good a man he has been, rather it is to determine the worth and value of the individual to the Army today ... The measure must be today's performance."

Marshall had predicted the program would affect about 1 percent of the Regular Army officer corps, mainly colonels and lieutenant colonels. From June to November 1941, 195 Regular Army officers were removed from the active list by discharge or forced retirement—more than five times the number removed in five years under the prior procedure, or about 1.3 percent of all Regular Army officers. Nearly all were field officers: 31 colonels, 117 lieutenant colonels, 31 majors, and 16 captains. Many officers eliminated for being over-age in grade were retained for administrative duties; a tabulation in August 1941 showed that 139 colonels, 252 lieutenant colonels, and 111 majors from the over-age list were already serving on troop duty.

Marshall justified the effort chiefly in terms of physical endurance for field command, testifying that leadership in the field depended on "one's legs and stomach and nervous system" and that in World War I more field officers had been relieved for physical reasons than for any other cause. Among the officers whose age placed them at risk but who were retained was George S. Patton, then 54.

== Modern usage ==
The term "plucking board" has remained in occasional use in U.S. defense commentary to describe proposals for the involuntary retirement of senior officers, with the Marshall-era board frequently cited as a precedent. Such invocations have at times been associated with politically charged arguments about the composition of the senior officer corps.

== See also ==
- Tombstone promotion
- Selection board (United States military)
- Up or out
- Navy Personnel Act of 1899
- George C. Marshall
