= List of United States Marine Corps tombstone lieutenant generals =

The following people are tombstone lieutenant generals in the United States Marine Corps. A tombstone promotion transferred an officer to the retired list with the rank of the next higher grade.

From 1925 to 1959, Marine Corps officers could retire with a tombstone promotion to the rank but not the pay of the next higher grade if they were specially commended for the performance of duty in actual combat before the end of World War II. The original 1925 authorization was limited to officers too old to be promoted to a higher grade, so those holding the highest grade of major general did not qualify for a tombstone promotion until 1938, when eligibility was expanded to cover any officer with a qualifying combat citation. In October 1941, retiring major general James C. Breckinridge received a tombstone promotion to lieutenant general, the first Marine to achieve three-star rank. Retired major generals John A. Lejeune and John T. Myers were advanced to lieutenant general in April 1942, after tombstone promotions were extended to officers who retired before 1938.

Dozens of major generals retired with a tombstone promotion to lieutenant general. By January 1, 1957, 18 of the 21 living retired lieutenant generals—86 percent—had never served in that rank on active duty. Congress stopped all tombstone promotions effective November 1, 1959.

== List of U.S. Marine Corps tombstone lieutenant generals ==
Each entry lists the officer's name, date appointed major general, date retired and advanced to lieutenant general, and other biographical notes.

A major general's date of rank, as listed in the Register of the Commissioned and Warrant Officers of the United States Navy and Marine Corps, often predated his actual date of appointment by several years. This was because the Navy had only one flag grade, rear admiral, which was divided into a lower half and upper half. Rear admirals advanced automatically from lower to upper half by seniority instead of selection, so the date of rank for a rear admiral of the upper half remained the date he was promoted to rear admiral of the lower half. Since rear admirals of the upper half ranked with major generals and the lower half with brigadier generals, the Officer Personnel Act of 1947 assigned major generals the same dates of rank they held as brigadier generals.

Name	Date appointed major general	Date retired	Notes
John A. Lejeune	1 Jul 1918	12 Nov 1929	(1867–1942) Major General Commandant of the Marine Corps, 1920–1929.
John T. Myers	1 Oct 1931	1 Feb 1935	(1871–1952)
James C. Breckinridge	1 Feb 1935	1 Oct 1941	(1877–1942) First Marine Corps lieutenant general.
Charles F. B. Price	1 Feb 1942	1 Oct 1945	(1881–1954)
Ross E. Rowell	30 Jun 1942	1 Nov 1946	(1884–1947)
Julian C. Smith	26 Aug 1942	1 Dec 1946	(1885–1975)
Henry L. Larsen	28 Sep 1942	1 Nov 1946	(1890–1962)
James L. Underhill	28 Sep 1942	1 Nov 1946	(1891–1991)
Keller E. Rockey	28 Sep 1942	1 Sep 1950	(1888–1970)
Samuel L. Howard	28 Sep 1942	31 Mar 1953	(1891–1960)
Ralph J. Mitchell	28 Sep 1942	May 1948	(1891–1970)
Pedro A. del Valle	10 Jan 1944	1 Jan 1948	(1893–1978)
Thomas E. Watson	20 Jan 1944	1 Jul 1950	(1892–1966)
James T. Moore	1 Feb 1944	1 Nov 1946	(1893–1953)
Thomas E. Bourke	1 Feb 1944	1 Nov 1946	(1896–1978)
Francis P. Mulcahy	5 Feb 1944	1 Apr 1946	(1894–1973)
Louis E. Woods	10 Sep 1944	Jul 1951	(1895–1971)
Field Harris	10 Sep 1944	1 Jul 1953	(1895–1967)
Claude A. Larkin	1 Apr 1945	1 Mar 1946	(1891–1969)
Leo D. Hermle	1947	Sep 1949	(1890–1976)
William J. Wallace	1947	Jul 1952	(1895–1977)
William T. Clement	1948	May 1952	(1894–1955)
John T. Walker	1948	Jul 1954	(1893–1955)
Merwin H. Silverthorn	1949	1 Jul 1954	(1896–1985)
William E. Riley	1950	1 Jun 1951	(1897–1970)
Robert H. Pepper	1950	1 May 1957	(1895–1968)
Henry D. Linscott	1951	Oct 1955	(1894–1973)
Edward A. Craig	1951	1 Jun 1951	(1896–1994)
Thomas J. Cushman	1951	Feb 1954	(1895–1972)
John T. Selden	1951	Apr 1955	(1893–1964)
Walter W. Wensinger	1951	Aug 1956	(1894–1972)
Clayton C. Jerome	1952	Jun 1958	(1901–1978)
James A. Stuart	1952	May 1955	(1899–1967)
George F. Good Jr.	1952	1 Jul 1958	(1901–1991)
John C. McQueen	1953	1 Jul 1958	(1899–1985)
James P. Riseley	1953	1 Jul 1959	(1898–1992)
Albert D. Cooley	1953	Aug 1954	(1900–1976)
Lewis B. Puller	1953	1 Nov 1955	(1898–1971)
Robert O. Bare	1953	1 Jul 1957	(1901–1980)
Reginald H. Ridgely Jr.	1954	1 Nov 1959	(1902–1979)
Homer L. Litzenberg	1954	31 May 1959	(1903–1963)
Karl S. Day	1954	1 Mar 1957	(1896–1973) Marine Corps Reserve.

== Legislative history ==
The following list of Congressional legislation concerns tombstone promotions to the grade of lieutenant general in the United States Marine Corps. Each entry lists an act of Congress, its citation in the United States Statutes at Large, and a summary of the act's relevance.

Each entry lists an act of Congress, its citation in the United States Statutes at Large, and a summary of the act's relevance.

Legislation	Citation	Summary
Act of March 4, 1925	43 Stat. 1279	Authorized officers who were specially commended for performance of duty in actual combat during World War I, and who retired because of ineligibility for promotion due to age, to be placed on the retired list with the rank of the next higher grade and three-fourths of the active-duty pay of the grade in which serving at the time of retirement.
Act of June 23, 1938	52 Stat. 951	Authorized officers who were specially commended for performance of duty in actual combat, to be placed on the retired list with the rank of the next higher grade and three-fourths of the active-duty pay of the grade in which serving at the time of retirement.
Act of February 23, 1942	56 Stat. 120	Authorized officers who were specially commended for performance of duty in actual combat, and who retired before June 23, 1938, to be advanced on the retired list to the rank of the next higher grade and three-fourths of the active-duty pay of the grade in which serving at the time of retirement (John A. Lejeune, John T. Myers).
Act of August 7, 1947 [Officer Personnel Act of 1947]	61 Stat. 864; 61 Stat. 874	Assigned date of rank for a major general to be the same as his date of rank as brigadier general.; Authorized officers who were specially commended for performance of duty in actual combat on or before December 31, 1946, to be placed on the retired list with (or advanced on the retired list to) the rank of the next higher grade and three-fourths of the active-duty pay of the grade in which serving at the time of retirement.
Act of October 12, 1949 [Career Compensation Act of 1949]	63 Stat. 835	Repealed authorization for officers who were specially commended for performance of duty in actual combat, to retire with three-fourths of the active-duty pay of the grade in which serving at the time of retirement.
Act of August 11, 1959	73 Stat. 337	Repealed authorization for officers who were specially commended for performance of duty in actual combat, to retire with the rank of the next higher grade, effective November 1, 1959.

== See also ==
- Tombstone promotion
- Lieutenant general (United States)
- List of United States Marine Corps tombstone generals
- List of United States Marine Corps lieutenant generals on active duty before 1960
- List of United States Navy tombstone vice admirals
- List of United States Coast Guard tombstone vice admirals
