= Joseph Stika =

Joseph Edward Stika (September 21, 1889 - July 15, 1976) was a Vice Admiral in the United States Coast Guard and a recipient of the Navy Cross. Stika was born in Milwaukee, Wisconsin; his official residence was listed as Kewaunee, Wisconsin. He graduated from the United States Coast Guard Academy in 1911 and held various commands until he retired in 1951, including the USCGC Bibb (WPG-31). In 1934, while commanding the USS Seneca, he received a commendation from the government of Sweden for his service during a rescue mission involving the Swedish vessel af Chapman.

Stika received the Navy Cross for his actions during the T.A. Gillespie Company Shell Loading Plant explosion near the end of World War I.

His award citation reads:

The President of the United States of America takes pleasure in presenting the Navy Cross to First Lieutenant Joseph E. Stika, United States Coast Guard, for heroic conduct on the occasion of the fire at the T.A. Gillespie shell-loading plant, Morgan, New Jersey, on 4 and 5 October 1918, when, with others, he moved a train loaded with high explosives to a place of safety through an area where fire was liable to break out at any moment.

Stika died on July 15, 1976, in Norfolk, Virginia.
