= Tombstone promotion =

Advance in rank awarded at retirement

A tombstone promotion is an advance in rank awarded at retirement. It is often an honorary promotion that does not include any corresponding increase in retired pay, whose only benefit is the right to be addressed by the higher rank and have it engraved on one's tombstone.

The term was originally coined to describe the one-grade retirement promotion authorized for United States Navy line officers in 1899 to induce aging American Civil War veterans to make way for younger officers. After postwar cutbacks following the Civil War and World War I, tombstone promotions were introduced to encourage early retirements and reduce the excessive number of officers recruited during wartime expansion, at the time including both the rank and retired pay of the higher grade.

Tombstone promotions are also incentives for officers to complete a full career in military communities that do not provide flag-rank opportunities. Until 1925, a lieutenant in a Navy staff corps could retire as a commodore after 40 years of service. Honorary tombstone promotions are still granted for this reason to long-serving permanent professors at the U.S. Military Academy and U.S. Air Force Academy, and to assistant judge advocates general of the Navy.

Tombstone promotions have also been granted to honor exceptional individual service, such as building the Panama Canal or commendable performance in combat. From 1925 to 1959, thousands of United States Navy, Marine Corps, Coast Guard, and Coast and Geodetic Survey officers retired with honorary one-grade promotions on the basis of combat citations awarded before the end of World War II. By May 1959, 1,222 of the 1,420 retired Navy rear admirals had never served in that grade on active duty, being captains who retired with an honorary promotion. The derisive nickname of "tombstone admiral" was sometimes used to describe these officers.

== United States armed services ==
=== Civil War hump ===
==== Promotion stagnation ====
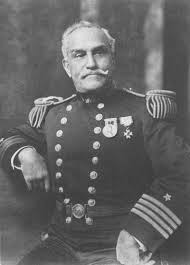
After 22 years as a Navy lieutenant, George P. Colvocoresses was finally promoted at the age of 50, and applied to retire with a tombstone promotion to rear admiral a decade later.

After the Civil War, promotions stagnated in the Navy because too many officers were recruited during the war. Wartime officers rose to higher grades at a relatively young age and could remain in service until retirement, resulting in a group of younger officers who were trapped in lower grades. For example, French E. Chadwick was commissioned ensign in 1866 and spent only a year as a lieutenant before being promoted to lieutenant commander in 1869 at the age of 25; George P. Colvocoresses was commissioned in 1870 and was only promoted to lieutenant in 1897, after 22 years in grade.

In 1881, to flatten the hump of unpromotable officers, a board chaired by Naval Academy superintendent Robert L. Phythian proposed that officers in excess of certain grade distributions be allowed to retire with the rank and retired pay of the next highest grade. Tombstone promotions as retirement incentives had been suggested as early as 1842, when the Senate Naval Affairs Committee proposed that senior captains, commanders, and lieutenants be encouraged to retire voluntarily by giving them the rank and half pay of the next higher grade. A decade later, the outgoing secretary of the Navy recommended compelling officers to retire for age or incapacity, with an honorary one-rank promotion to soften the blow. The Phythian Board's report eventually led Congress to tie a tombstone promotion to the Navy's first "plucking" board in 1899.

==== 1899 Navy Personnel Act ====
The Navy Personnel Act of 1899 was a sweeping reform designed to revitalize the officer corps, especially at command ranks, by weeding out superannuated Civil War veterans. Line officers in the grades of captain, commander, and lieutenant commander would be mandatorily retired with the rank and three-fourths the sea pay of the next higher grade if they were selected by a board. House Naval Affairs Committee member Amos J. Cummings drew an analogy to Army officers who were retired in the next higher grade if discovered to be physically disqualified by an examination for promotion to that grade, and explained the higher pay as a way to make up for the involuntary nature of the retirements.

Since the point of the law was to open more vacancies in higher ranks, Congress offered the same tombstone promotion to officers who retired voluntarily. "If we did not do it we would have very few applicants for retirement," said House Naval Affairs Committee chairman George E. Foss. "There must be an incentive for voluntary retirement." The incentives for voluntary retirement applied to all Navy officers with a creditable record that included service during the Civil War.

Although the Act had also abolished the rank of commodore for active service, it still maintained the retirement rank for Navy captains who were voluntarily or involuntarily retired. However, captains who received their tombstone promotions for service during the Civil War were retired as a rear admiral instead.

Neither the plucking board nor tombstone promotions substantially flattened the promotion hump, and promotion by seniority continued to advance officers close to retirement age. When rear admiral Robert M. Berry reached the mandatory retirement age of 62, the most senior captain was Harrison G. O. Colby, also 62. The second-ranking captain at the time, Leavitt C. Logan, was promoted to rear admiral only two days before retiring for age.

In 1912, Congress repealed the 1899 tombstone promotion system for all but Civil War veterans, specifying that Navy officers who applied for voluntary retirement or were selected for involuntary retirement would have the rank and three-fourths the sea pay of the grade from which retired. The root causes of the promotion hump were not resolved until the late 1910s, when Congress replaced promotion by seniority with promotion by selection, and provided different mandatory retirement ages for each grade.

==== One-day generals ====
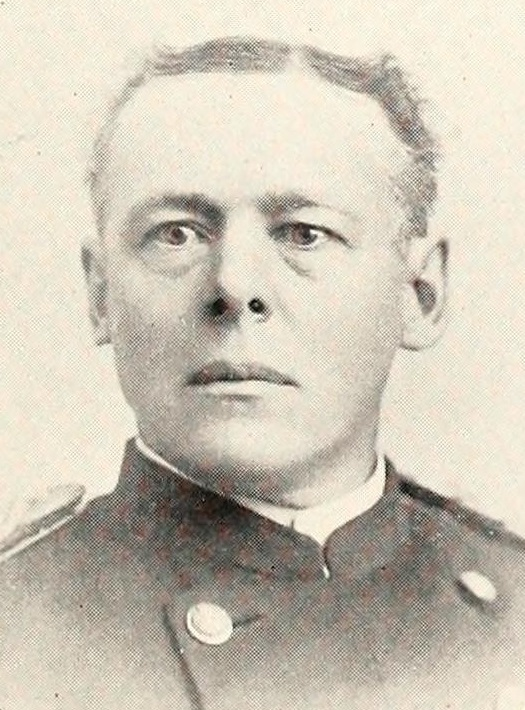
Over three weeks in 1903, Charles A. Woodruff and thirty-three other Army colonels were each promoted to brigadier general and retired after only one day in grade.

The Army, which had its own Civil War hump to flatten, created the equivalent of a tombstone promotion by advancing officers shortly before they retired, often with only a single day in the higher grade.

Among the brigadier general ranks in 1894, Frank Wheaton was promoted to major general ahead of John R. Brooke, who was more senior but younger, because Wheaton would retire for age only a month later. The same promotions were offered to James W. Forsyth and Zenas R. Bliss, on the condition that they retired after a week, allowing Brooke to become an active major general. After Brooke's retirement, the four brigadier general vacancies were filled by six colonels, two of whom also retired almost immediately, setting a precedent for the future. Between the end of the Spanish–American War and August 1901, 23 more colonels were promoted to brigadier general and promptly retired.

Navy officers made similar pacts to retire more officers in flag grades. In 1883, Asiatic Station commander Peirce Crosby agreed to step down a few months early so Alexander C. Rhind could be promoted to rear admiral the day before reaching retirement age. In July 1894, Asiatic Station commander Joseph S. Skerrett retired early to vacate his rear admiralcy for the senior commodore, Joseph P. Fyffe, who also promptly retired a few days later and was succeeded by Oscar F. Stanton, who also retired early after a few days. Stanton's replacement, Henry Erben, was rear admiral for five weeks, until his statutory retirement in September.

In early 1903, the Senate passed an amendment to give Army officers with at least one year of service during the Civil War a similar tombstone promotion as provided in 1899 for Civil War veterans in the Navy, but the House rejected it. Undeterred, the War Department continued the administration's policy of rewarding Civil War veterans with more than 40 years of service by promoting them to brigadier general before they retired. From 1903 to 1906, another 62 colonels were promoted to brigadier general and retired after only one day in grade, including three weeks in 1903 when 34 colonels were promoted and retired at the rate of one or two a day. Even after Congress provided a one-grade tombstone promotion for all Army officers with Civil War service in 1904, the administration continued to nominate one-day generals, lieutenant colonels and even a one-day major, John L. Bullis.

Congress finally required in 1906 that general officers serve at least one year in grade before retiring for reasons other than age or disability. This largely ended the succession of one-day generals, except for occasional coincidences of age and deliberate promotions of incapacitated officers. For example, major general Adolphus W. Greely's 1908 retirement triggered a chain of promotions that elevated Charles Morris to brigadier general two days before he retired for age. In November 1923, brigadier generals Harry H. Bandholtz and William H. Hay were each promoted to major general and immediately retired for disability; Bandholtz had collapsed from heart problems in April and Hay was recovering from an automobile accident the previous year.

==== Civil War veterans ====
The 1904 Army Appropriation Act authorized Army officers who had served in the Civil War to retire with the rank and retired pay of the next higher grade, if they were below the grade of brigadier general and retired for disability, age, or after 40 years of service. In 1906, Navy and Marine Corps officers meeting those criteria were granted the same tombstone promotions, as were Revenue Cutter Service officers in 1908. In 1907, Army brigadier generals who held the rank for at least three years and had served in the Civil War could retire with the rank and retired pay of major general.

=== World War I hump ===
The massive World War I expansion and postwar drawdown of the Army and Navy created a new hump of excess officers in lower grades, which both services tried to flatten by again offering tombstone promotions for voluntary retirements, and also restricting length of service in each grade to force involuntary retirements.

In 1935, Congress invited Army officers below the grade of major, who had served during World War I and had 15 to 29 years of service, to retire voluntarily in the grade of major. By 1940, the World War I hump had advanced into field grades, so the tombstone promotion was updated to allow officers who had served during World War I to retire in the grade of lieutenant colonel if they had 23 to 28 years of service, or colonel if more than 28 years, and failed to reach those grades due to length-of-service restrictions.

Congress gave a similar tombstone promotion to the Navy in 1938, authorizing lieutenants with 21 years of service to retire in the grade of lieutenant commander if they had served in the Navy or Naval Reserve Force during World War I.

=== Building the Panama Canal ===
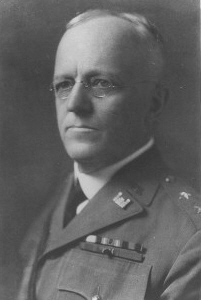
Army chief of engineers Edgar Jadwin received a tombstone promotion to lieutenant general for helping to build the Panama Canal.

Following the completion of the Panama Canal in 1914, Congress authorized Army and Navy officers who had served more than three years with the Isthmian Canal Commission to be advanced one grade in rank upon retirement. Under this provision, Edgar Jadwin retired as a lieutenant general in 1929 and James F. Leys as a vice admiral in 1932, the first Army engineer and first Navy surgeon, respectively, to achieve three-star rank.

The Comptroller General ruled Jadwin was entitled to the retired pay of a lieutenant general since several retired lieutenant generals had continued to draw pensions even after the grade was abolished on the active list in 1907. However, the same Comptroller General denied Leys the retired pay of a vice admiral on the grounds that the grade had been abolished in 1890 and all subsequent vice admirals actually held the grade of rear admiral with only the temporary rank of vice admiral, so the grade of vice admiral did not exist. The Court of Claims overturned this decision and gave Leys the retired pay of a vice admiral.

=== Navy staff corps officers with 40 years of service ===
In 1877, Navy officers of the Medical, Pay, and Engineer Corps, chaplains, professors of mathematics, and naval constructors were authorized to retire with the relative rank but not the pay of a commodore, if they retired after 45 years of service, or at the age of 62 after at least 40 years of service. This was meant to reward long service in a staff corps with a higher rank on the retired list than could be attained on the active list, since the only staff corps officers with ranks higher than captain were the bureau chiefs. Staff corps officers continued to retire with the rank of commodore even after the grade was abolished in 1899. In 1916, the rank of rear admiral was established on the active list for all staff corps officers except chaplains and professors of mathematics, weakening the original rationale for this promotion by making flag rank more attainable. The retirement age was increased to 64 and staff corps officers were given the pay of their rank, so officers who retired with the rank of commodore now received its retired pay as well.

A staff corps officer's right to retire as a commodore could even survive the demise of his staff corps. In 1925, retired line officer Frank W. Bartlett, originally an officer in the Engineer Corps, successfully argued that he should have been retired as a commodore instead of a captain, even though he had transferred to the line along with the rest of the Engineer Corps in 1899.

==== Lieutenants retired as commodores ====
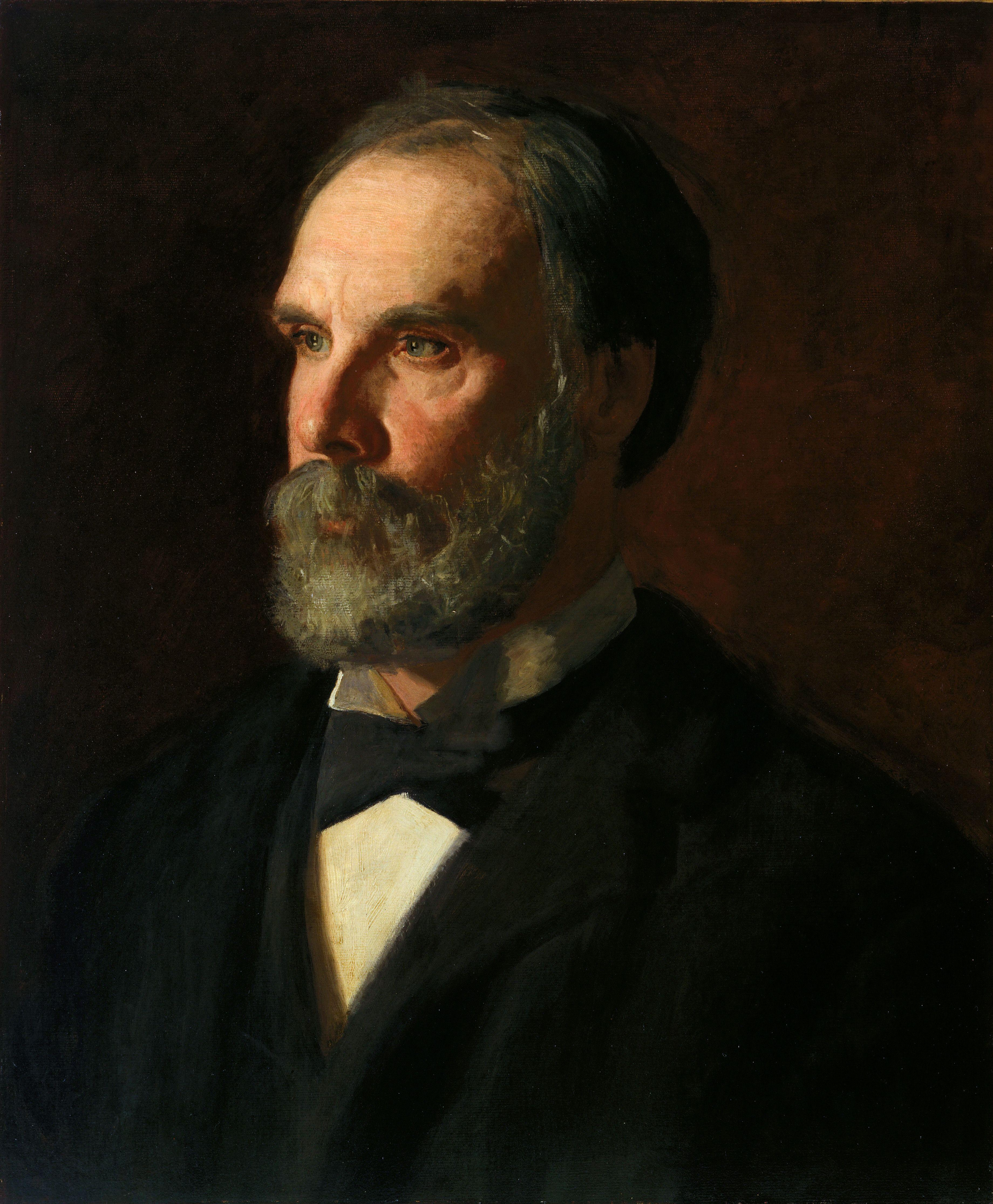
Naval Academy professor W. Woolsey Johnson was promoted four grades from lieutenant to commodore when he retired in 1921.

Although intended for captains, the wording of the law allowed staff corps officers of any rank to retire as a commodore after enough years of service. In 1913, two civilian professors at the Naval Academy, Nathaniel M. Terry and W. Woolsey Johnson, were commissioned by special act of Congress in the grade of professor of mathematics with the rank of lieutenant. When Terry retired in 1917, his combined service as civilian professor and commissioned officer in the Corps of Professors of Mathematics exceeded 45 years, so he was placed on the retired list with the rank of commodore and a pay raise, since the retired pay of a commodore exceeded his active-duty pay as a lieutenant. Johnson received the same four-grade promotion from lieutenant to commodore when he retired in 1921.

Two lieutenants in the Pay Corps and Construction Corps were promoted to commodore when they retired after more than 40 years of mostly enlisted service. After 38 years as a paymaster's clerk or chief pay clerk, Edward F. Delaney received an emergency commission during World War I as an assistant paymaster with the rank of ensign, rising to passed assistant paymaster with the rank of lieutenant by 1922, when he retired at the age of 64 with a promotion to commodore. Ellis W. Craig was commissioned as a naval constructor with the rank of lieutenant in 1921 and retired as a commodore in 1924, after only 3 years as a commissioned officer and 39 years as an enlisted man, warrant officer, or chief warrant officer. The Comptroller General of the United States argued that the law "was not designed to establish the military monstrosity of requiring the promotion to the flag rank of commodore of one who had served practically all his career in the Navy in a grade ranking with but after ensign" and tried to void both promotions, but was overruled by the Court of Claims.

After the Attorney General of the United States confirmed that Terry was entitled to his tombstone promotion, the Navy began appealing for Congress to stop lieutenants from retiring as commodores. In 1925, Congress closed the loophole by specifying that only captains could retire as commodores. The law was repealed altogether in 1926 except for the Corps of Professors of Mathematics, which was scheduled to dissolve when its last commissioned professor retired, since new appointments in that corps had been halted in 1916. The Officer Personnel Act of 1947 repealed this law even for professors of mathematics, all of whom had long since retired.

=== Marine Corps colonels with 40 years of service ===
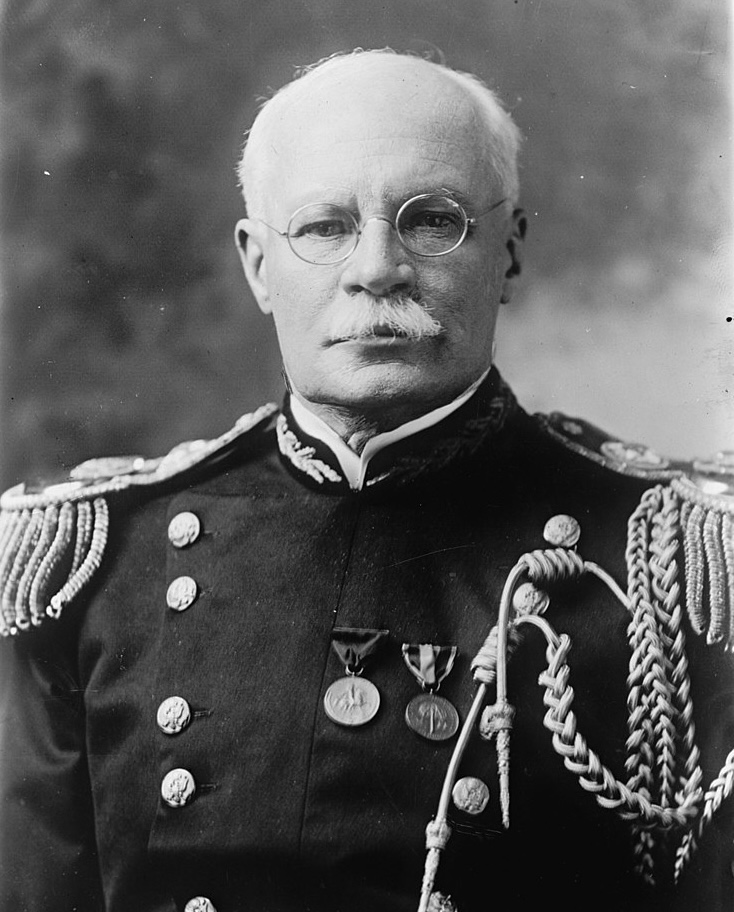
Army chief of staff Hugh L. Scott asked that a Marine Corps tombstone promotion be extended to the Army, but Congress repealed it instead.

The 1916 naval appropriation act authorized Marine Corps colonels to retire as brigadier generals after 45 years of service, or after 40 years of service if they retired at age 64, mirroring the tombstone promotion to commodore in Navy staff corps.

No Marine Corps colonel then on the active list had served long enough to qualify for this promotion yet, but a number of senior Army colonels did have more than 40 years of service. Army chief of staff Hugh L. Scott asked Congress to give the same promotion to the Army, since "otherwise the Army becomes the object of comparison with what may seem to be the more favored branch of Congress". Instead, the 1917 naval appropriation act simply withdrew the tombstone promotion from the Marine Corps, only nine months after it was extended.

=== Coast Guard officers with 40 years of service ===
In 1923, Coast Guard officers with 40 years of service were authorized to retire with the rank and retired pay of the next higher grade. For captains, the next higher grade for this purpose was commodore, until it was changed retroactively to rear admiral (lower half) in 1937.

Like Navy staff corps during the nineteenth century, the Coast Guard was so small that its officers had little chance of reaching flag rank or even captain, so the promotion was meant as an incentive for officers to complete a full 40-year career. Flag grades did not exist in the Coast Guard, whose commandant held only the ex officio rank of rear admiral and reverted to his permanent grade of captain upon leaving office, so a tombstone promotion was the only way Coast Guard officers could retire with the same rank and pay as officers with comparable length of service in the much larger Navy.

Only 21 Coast Guard officers received this type of promotion. In 1947, flag grades were established in the Coast Guard, giving its officers the same promotion opportunities as their Navy counterparts, so at the Coast Guard's request, Congress repealed the 40-year tombstone promotion when it codified the various Coast Guard statutes into positive law in 1949.

=== Combat citations before the end of World War II ===
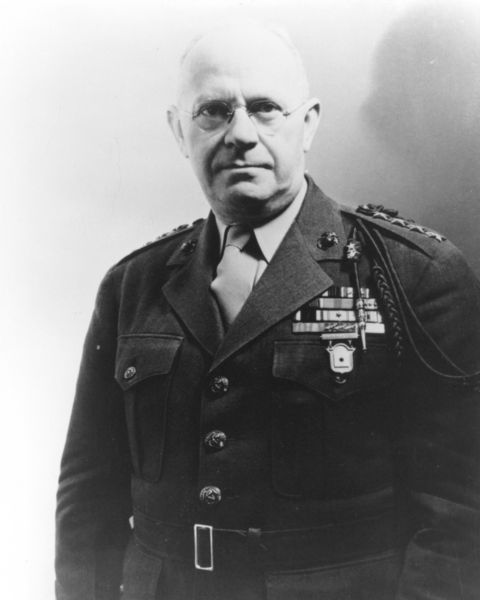
A tombstone promotion for combat citations made retired Marine Corps commandant Thomas Holcomb the first four-star general in Marine Corps history in 1944.

From 1925 to 1959, officers of the maritime services—Navy, Marine Corps, Coast Guard, and Coast and Geodetic Survey—could retire with a tombstone promotion to the rank but not the pay of the next higher grade, if they were specially commended for their performance of duty in actual combat before the end of World War II.

Retired officers who actually served in a grade while on active duty had precedence over those who advanced to that grade based on combat citations. Captains who only reached flag rank by retiring with an honorary combat citation promotion were derisively nicknamed "tombstone admirals".

Honorary tombstone promotions for combat citations produced the first four-star Marine, Thomas Holcomb; the first three-star dentist, Alexander G. Lyle; and the first three-star chaplain, Maurice S. Sheehy.

==== World War I ====
Tombstone promotions for combat citations were inspired by the case of Navy captain Douglas E. Dismukes, who faced mandatory retirement in 1925 because his age disqualified him from further consideration for promotion to rear admiral. Dismukes had commanded the transport Mount Vernon during World War I, and was decorated for saving the ship after it was torpedoed by a German submarine while returning to the United States with more than 1,600 passengers, including Minnesota congressman Thomas D. Schall.

Friends of Dismukes and Schall in the House and Senate introduced legislation to exempt Dismukes from the mandatory retirement law, but the Department of the Navy remained committed to its policy of retiring captains at age 56. Instead, Congress passed the so-called "Tombstone Law" that authorized Dismukes personally to be retired as a rear admiral, and provided more generally that all Navy and Marine Corps officers who were specially commended for their performance of duty in actual combat with the enemy during World War I, and who retired due to age ineligibility for promotion, would retire with three-fourths the retired pay of the grade from which retired, and the rank of the next higher grade.

Two years later, Congress had to pass another law to advance retired Navy captain Reginald R. Belknap to rear admiral on the retired list, since Belknap had retired for excessive time in grade, not age, and therefore did not qualify for the 1925 tombstone promotion. Congress extended tombstone promotion eligibility to cover retirement due to time in grade in 1931, and retirement due to physical disability in 1936.

==== World War II ====
Between 1938 and 1942, tombstone promotions for combat citations were expanded to include periods other than World War I, Navy and Marine Corps officers already retired, Navy staff corps officers, Naval and Marine Corps Reservists, and Coast Guard and Coast and Geodetic Survey officers.

In 1943, the Department of the Navy unsuccessfully asked Congress to restrict tombstone promotions to commendations awarded before the President declared a state of emergency on September 8, 1939, following the outbreak of World War II in Europe. Only 55 Navy and 38 Marine Corps officers had received tombstone promotions for commendations prior to that date, with 38 Navy and 77 Marine Corps officers still eligible. However, by January 26, 1943, another 2,000 officers had already been commended for actions since the attack on Pearl Harbor on December 7, 1941, along with 2,000 enlisted men who could qualify for a tombstone promotion if they ever became an officer. The Navy Department, which had always opposed the 1925 tombstone promotion law, worried that tombstone promotions would become the norm instead of the exception.

The Officer Personnel Act of 1947 consolidated all of the various tombstone promotion laws, and limited eligibility to combat citations awarded before the end of World War II, defined as December 31, 1946.

==== Grade at retirement ====
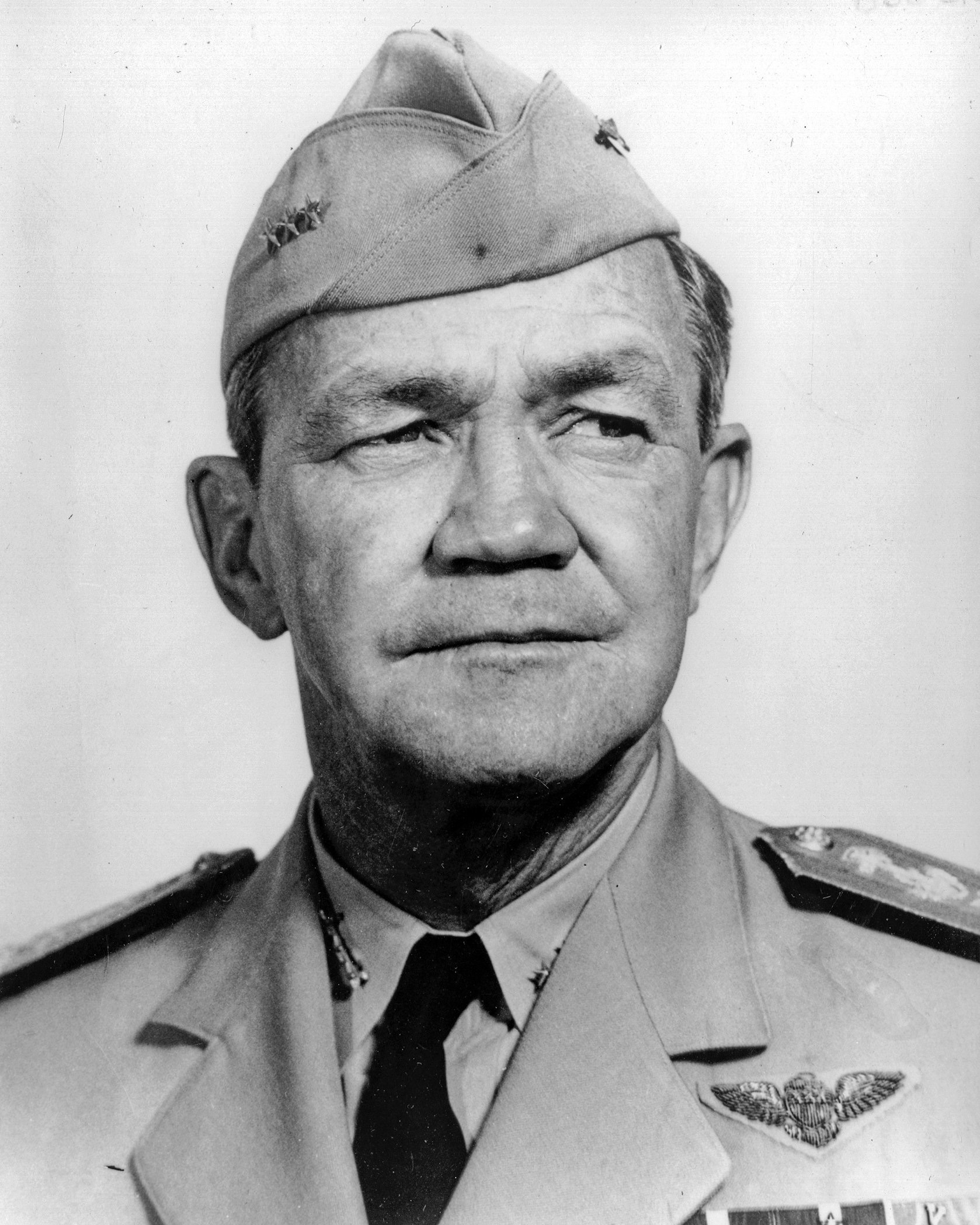
Vice Admiral Gerald F. Bogan lost his third star and a tombstone promotion to admiral three weeks before he retired, receiving instead a tombstone promotion back to vice admiral.

Tombstone promotions were based on an officer's grade on the day they actually retired. A vice admiral or lieutenant general could only receive a tombstone promotion to four-star admiral or general if he still held a three-star job when he retired, so when Marine Corps lieutenant general Oliver P. Smith was abruptly ordered to relinquish his three-star command on September 1, 1955, and revert to major general for the two months until his statutory retirement, he preserved his tombstone promotion to general by changing his retirement date to September 1.

Conversely, Navy vice admiral Gerald F. Bogan offended the secretary of the Navy during the so-called Revolt of the Admirals and was relieved of his three-star command on January 7, 1950, only three weeks before he was scheduled to retire with a tombstone promotion to admiral. Instead, he reverted to rear admiral and received a tombstone promotion back to vice admiral.

Exceptions to this rule were officers who held temporary grades during World War II. A 1946 law gave Navy, Marine Corps, and Coast Guard officers the retired pay as well as the rank of the highest temporary grade in which they had satisfactory service on or before June 30, 1946, which the Judge Advocate General of the Navy interpreted to mean an officer could apply his tombstone promotion to his highest temporary grade from World War II, instead of the grade he held when he retired. For example, Navy rear admiral David W. Bagley reverted from vice admiral to rear admiral after World War II, was restored to vice admiral when he retired on April 1, 1947, and received a tombstone promotion to admiral.

==== Retired pay ====
Although a tombstone promotion gave an officer only the rank of the next higher grade and not its retired pay, it could still increase the officer's retired pay if he retired with less than 30 years of service. Retired pay was computed by multiplying an officer's years of service by 2.5 percent of his highest active-duty pay, ranging from a minimum of 50 percent when an officer became eligible to retire after 20 years of service, to a maximum of 75 percent at 30 years. Until 1949, a tombstone promotion entitled an officer to retire with the 75 percent maximum after any length of service, making it possible to retire at 20 years with 75 percent pay instead of 50 percent.

The Career Compensation Act of 1949 gave all officers the same retired pay formula and repealed the 75 percent retired pay for a tombstone promotion, whose only remaining benefit was an honorary increase in rank.

==== Recall to active duty ====
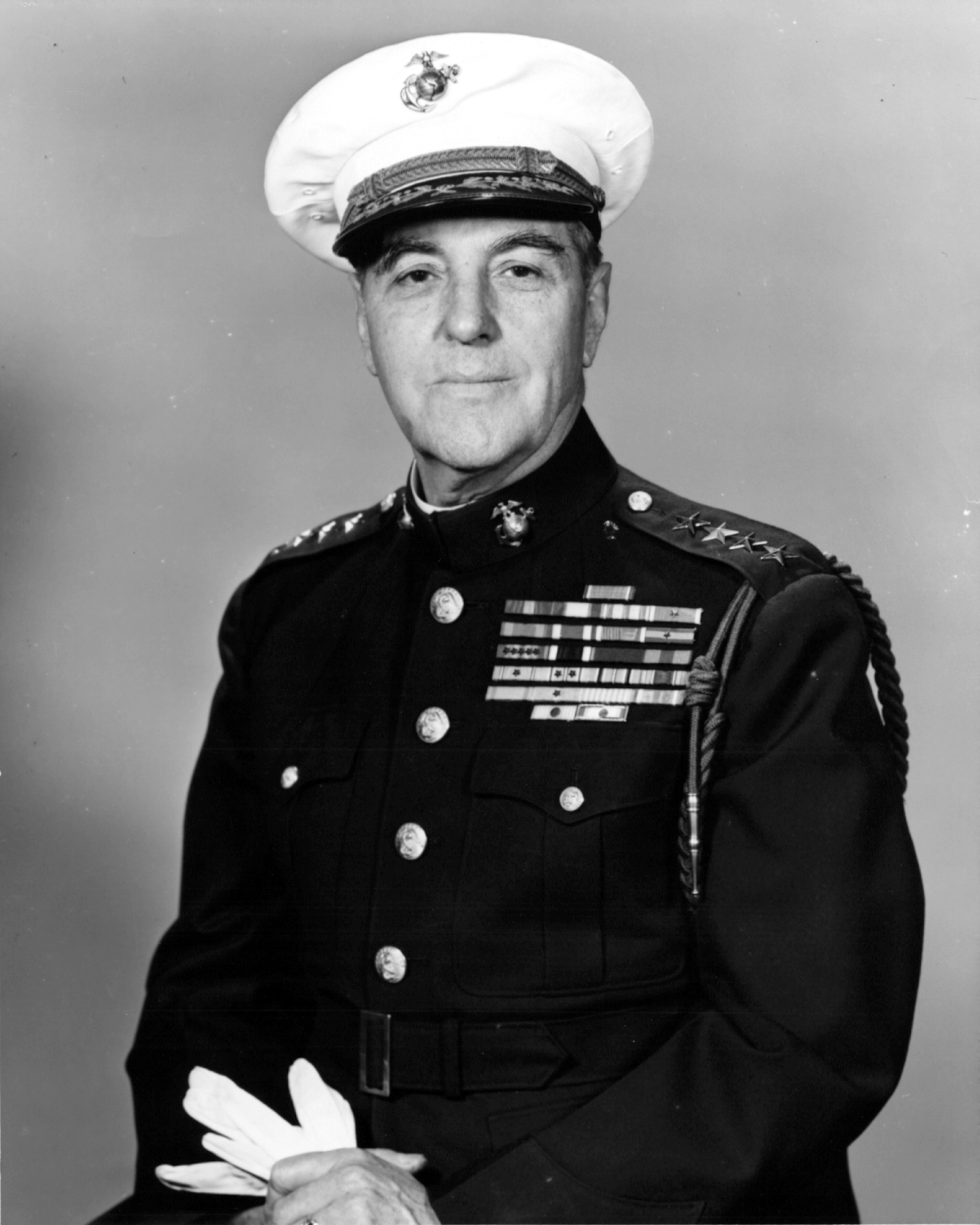
Lieutenant General Gerald C. Thomas retired with only the rank of general, but was recalled to active duty in his tombstone grade and eventually got its retired pay as well.

Officers who retired with a tombstone promotion could be recalled to active duty in either the grade from which they retired or their tombstone grade on the retired list. Starting in 1958, if recalled in their tombstone grade, officers became eligible for its retired pay after serving continuously in that grade for at least two years on active duty. For example, Marine Corps lieutenant general Gerald C. Thomas retired with a tombstone promotion to general on December 31, 1955, and was recalled to active duty in his tombstone grade to serve as staff director of the Net Evaluation Subcommittee of the National Security Council from April 1, 1956, to January 1, 1959, qualifying him after two years to be the first Marine, other than former commandants, to receive the retired pay of a general.

==== Coast Guard warrant officers ====
Tombstone promotions for combat citations were authorized for Coast Guard officers in 1942 and reauthorized in 1949 when the various statutes that governed the Coast Guard were codified into positive law. The 1949 law further provided that Coast Guard warrant officers who were specially commended for performance of duty in actual combat could retire with the grade of commissioned warrant officer and three-fourths the retired pay of a warrant officer. Subsequent legislation kept the tombstone promotion for Coast Guard officers and warrant officers in line with the Navy and Marine Corps, repealing its three-fourths retired pay in 1950, and the promotion itself in 1959.

==== Army and Air Force ====
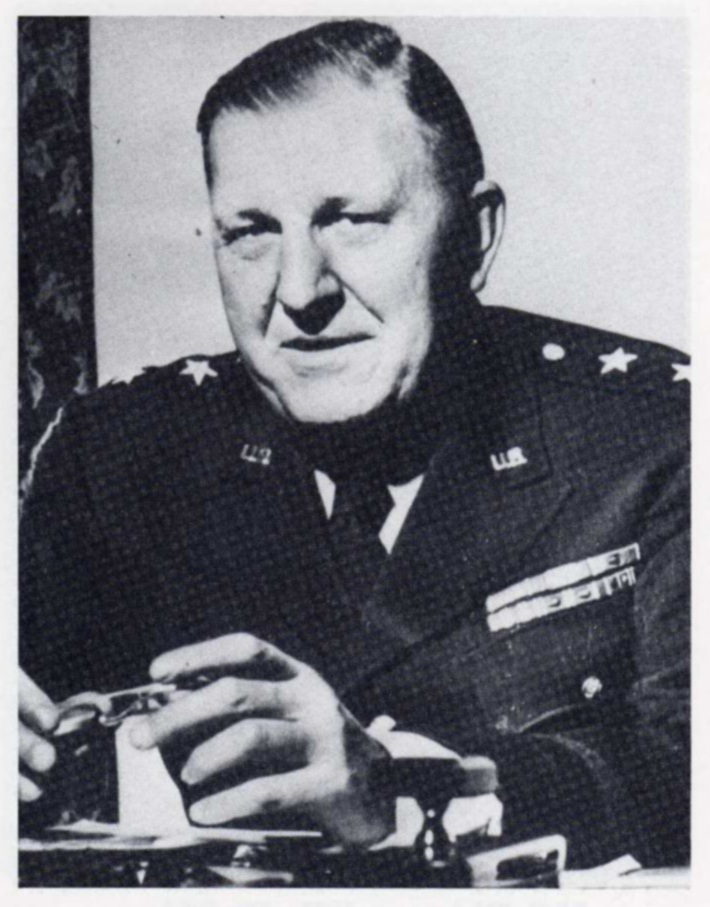
Army personnel chief John E. Dahlquist told Congress that if the Navy got tombstone promotions for combat citations, then so should the Army, but it would be better to repeal the "hero act" entirely.

An early draft of the Career Compensation Act of 1949 would have granted tombstone promotions in the Army for combat citations awarded up to December 31, 1946, the same as in the Navy. Army personnel chief John E. Dahlquist gave this expansion of the 1925 tombstone promotion law, disparagingly dubbed "the hero act", his unenthusiastic endorsement. "We have tried for years to get the hero act out. But if it is going to be continued, we must have it extended to the Army," he told a House subcommittee in 1949. "If we thought that we could abolish the hero act, we would like that best, but if we can't abolish it we must join them."

If the Army and Navy both got tombstone promotions, then the Air Force must have them too, said Air Force assistant personnel chief Richard E. Nugent, but equal treatment was better achieved by eliminating tombstone promotions altogether. The Air Force was adamantly opposed to adopting them itself, because the nature of air warfare during World War II gave only fliers the combat decorations needed for a tombstone promotion, unjustly discriminating against the half of all Air Force officers who had made an equal contribution as ground personnel.

The subcommittee deleted the provision from the final law, citing the administrative burden, expense, and inevitable controversy associated with retroactively assessing the tombstone promotion eligibility of all serving and retired Army and Air Force officers, as well as the fact that neither Army nor Air Force officials seemed to really want it. Asked how strenuously the other services would resist continuing tombstone promotions just for the Navy, Dahlquist shrugged, "Not strenuously. We think it is a poor law, but we are not going to worry about it."

==== "Tombstone promotion with pay" ====
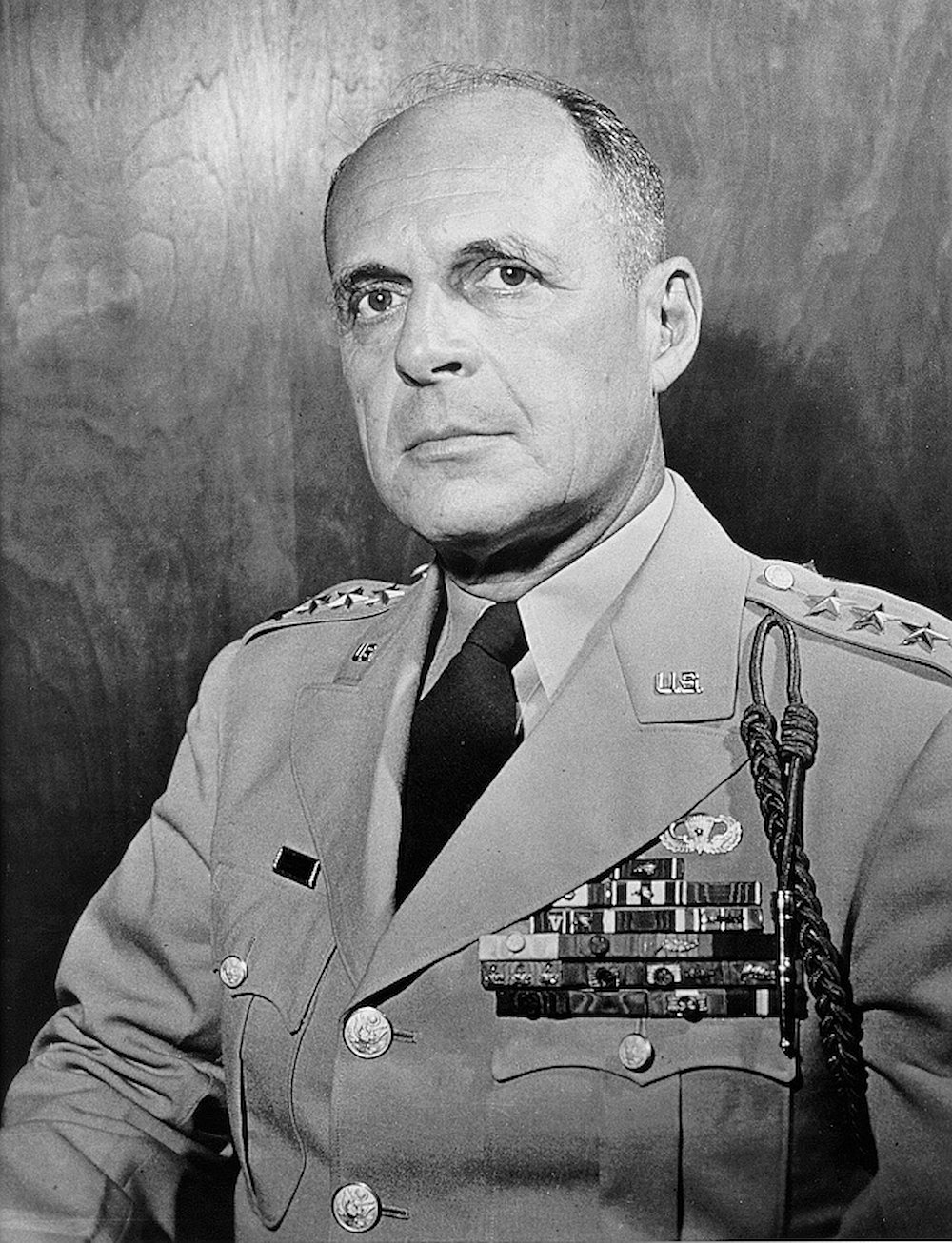
Army chief of staff Matthew B. Ridgway gave de facto tombstone promotions to old friends and sons of old friends.

Navy personnel officers claimed that the Army and Air Force already provided a "tombstone promotion with pay" by manipulating their dual promotion tracks for temporary and permanent grades. Since mandatory retirement laws were based on time in permanent grade but officers could retire in the highest temporary grade in which they served at least six months, the Army could deliberately promote a colonel to temporary brigadier general in his 29th year of service and then fail to select him for permanent brigadier general, forcing him to retire in his 30th year for excessive time in grade as a permanent colonel, but with the rank and retired pay of his highest temporary grade of brigadier general. The equivalent Navy captain also retired in his 30th year, but could receive a tombstone promotion to only the rank of rear admiral and not its retired pay.

For example, Army officer John G. Hill graduated from the United States Military Academy in 1924 and was selected for temporary brigadier general in 1953, confirmed by the Senate in January 1954, and retired in that grade seven months later, after 30 years of service. Navy officer Eugene T. Seaward graduated from the United States Naval Academy, also in 1924, and received a tombstone promotion to rear admiral when he retired 30 years later.

General Herbert B. Powell later corroborated this account of de facto tombstone promotions during his tenure as acting personnel chief under Army chief of staff Matthew B. Ridgway, recalling that when reviewing a list of brigadier generals who could be promoted to temporary major general, "General Ridgway looked over this list and decided that of the people being retired, he would promote about ten of them, old friends and sons of old friends of his, even though they would hold the rank only three to six months and then they'd be retired."

==== Repeal ====
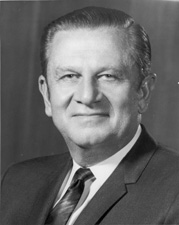
Senator and Air Force Reserve colonel Howard Cannon arranged to end tombstone promotions for combat citations, which were never extended to the Army and Air Force.

By May 29, 1959, the Navy retired list included 33 admirals, 154 vice admirals, and 1,222 rear admirals who had never served in those grades on active duty, representing 53 percent, 78 percent, and 86 percent, respectively, of all living retirees in those grades. Chief of Naval Personnel Harold Page Smith reported that the Navy was more than halfway through retiring the list of officers eligible for tombstone promotions based on combat citations from World War II, and that the tombstone promotion law would terminate itself when that list was exhausted.

Asked by Senator Howard Cannon, a member of the Senate Armed Services Committee and Air Force Reserve colonel, whether it would be better to expand tombstone promotions to the Army and Air Force or to eliminate them entirely, Assistant Secretary of Defense for Manpower and Personnel Charles C. Finucane replied that the Department of Defense opposed expanding tombstone promotions, since they devalued higher ranks, but had not pushed to eliminate them because officers had been led to expect them for decades and they would end automatically once every officer with a World War II combat citation had retired. "The Department's position, Senator, is that we do not approve of this, but it is the law."

To the Navy's surprise, Cannon sponsored an amendment to terminate all tombstone promotions on November 1, 1959, which he attached to a bill passed on August 11, 1959, to flatten the hump of excess officers who entered the service during World War II. In ironic contrast to Civil War and World War I hump legislation that created tombstone promotions to encourage voluntary retirement, the World War II hump bill achieved the same incentive by repealing them. About 1,500 officers with the rank of commander or above would lose their tombstone promotions unless they retired by November 1. Fearing a flood of hasty retirements that would wreak havoc with overseas assignments, the Navy lobbied to postpone the deadline until July 2, 1960, but Cannon blocked any extension.

==== Termination ====
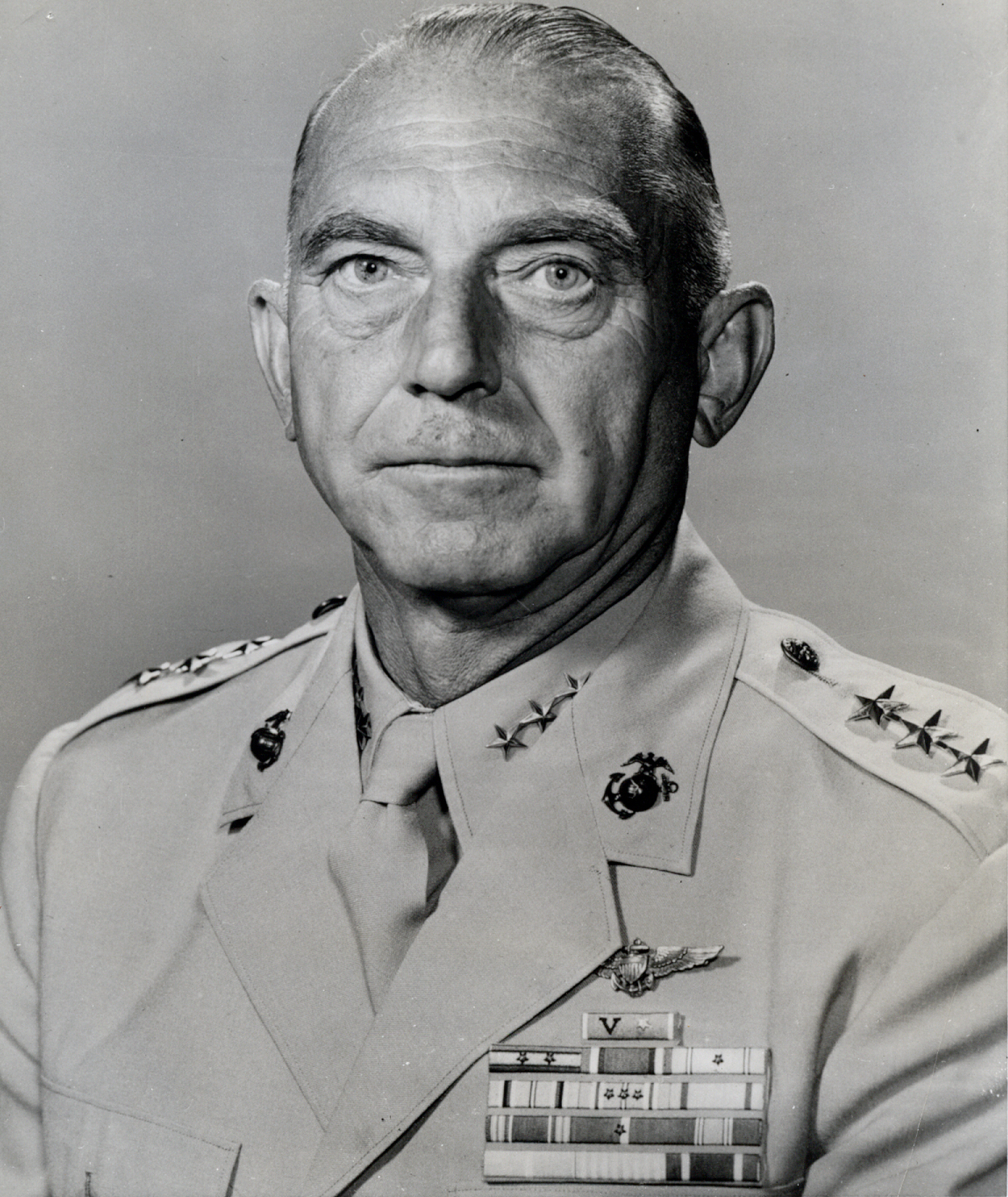
Lieutenant General Verne J. McCaul sacrificed a fourth star by choosing to retire two months after tombstone promotions ended.

Tombstone promotions on the basis of combat citations ended on November 1, 1959. The anticipated glut of early retirement applications never materialized. By September 10, 1959, only 29 Navy captains and 12 commanders had asked to retire with a tombstone promotion who would not already have had to retire by the end of the fiscal year anyway.

All five lieutenant generals in the Marine Corps asked to retire a few weeks after the repeal was passed, having been passed over for selection as commandant of the Marine Corps in favor of a major general, David M. Shoup. Lieutenant Generals Edwin A. Pollock, Vernon E. Megee, Merrill B. Twining, and Robert E. Hogaboom all retired on November 1 to collect their tombstone promotions to four-star general, but assistant commandant Verne J. McCaul gave up his tombstone promotion to remain on duty until the new commandant took office on January 1, 1960.

=== Modern examples ===
==== Appointments Clause ====
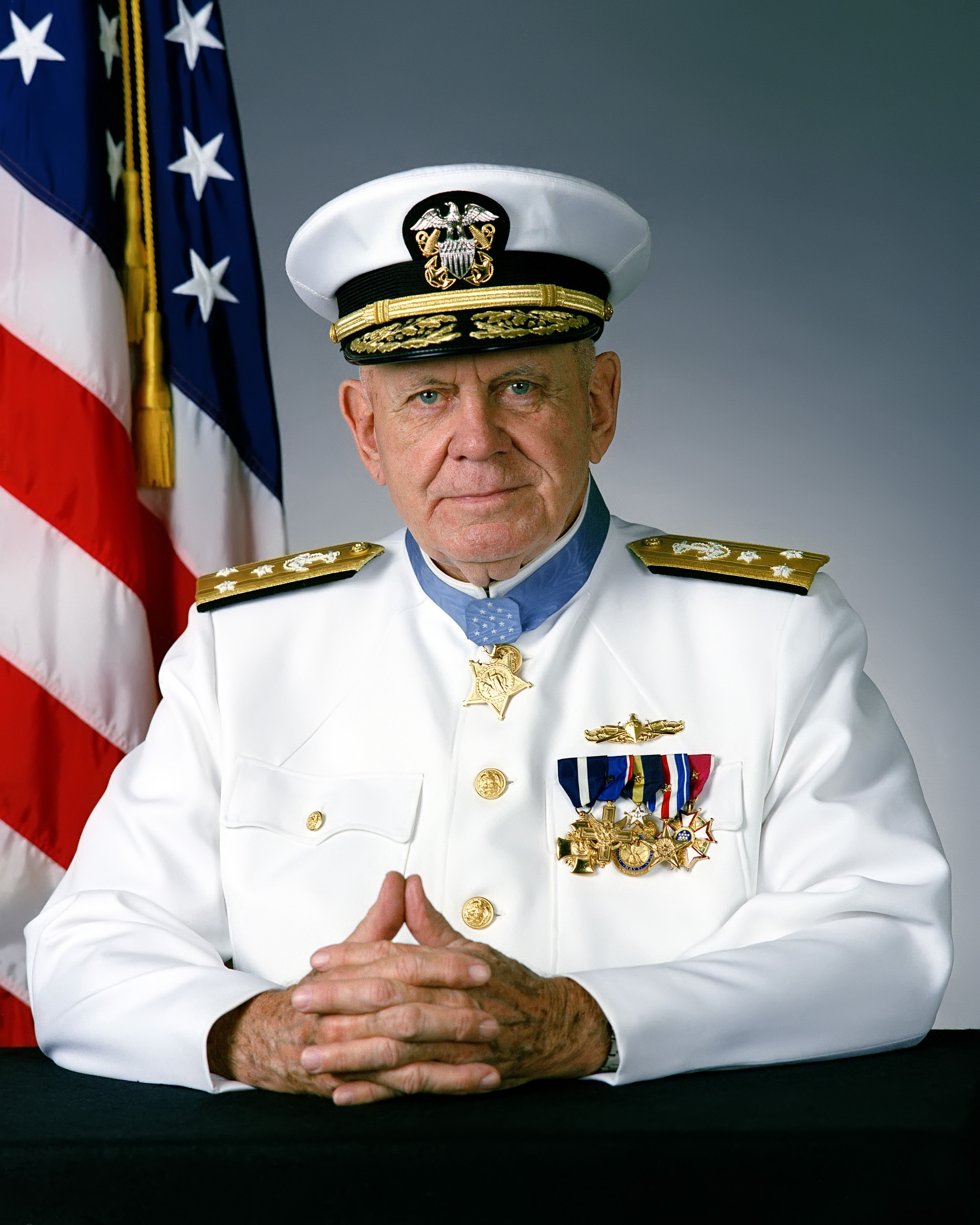
John D. Bulkeley received a tombstone promotion to vice admiral under the Appointments Clause of the United States Constitution in 1988.

The President can use his plenary power under the Appointments Clause of the United States Constitution to nominate any officer to be retired in a higher grade, subject to Senate confirmation.

For example, Rear Admiral John D. Bulkeley, who served as president of the Board of Inspection and Survey for 21 years, was advanced to vice admiral on the retired list under the Appointments Clause when he retired permanently in August 1988. Rear Admiral Levering Smith, technical director of the Navy's submarine-launched ballistic missile program for 20 years, was promoted to vice admiral when he stepped down in November 1977.

==== Service academy permanent professors ====
Under the Officer Personnel Act of 1947, any permanent professor, except the dean, of the U.S. Military Academy or U.S. Air Force Academy whose grade is below brigadier general and whose service as permanent professor has been long and distinguished, may retire in the grade of brigadier general at the discretion of the President, but with no pay increase.

For Air Force Academy professors, the secretary of the Air Force defines "long and distinguished" service to be at least 30 years of total active commissioned service and at least 10 years of continuous service as a permanent professor or department head. By 2018, nearly 80 percent of retired Air Force Academy permanent professors had received a tombstone promotion to brigadier general.

The equivalent of a permanent professor at the U.S. Naval Academy was originally an officer in the Corps of Professors of Mathematics. Like other Navy staff corps officers, professors of mathematics qualified for tombstone promotions to commodore after 40 years of service. Congress halted appointments to the corps in 1916, and it expired when the last professor retired on July 1, 1936. The tombstone promotion for the defunct corps was repealed by the Officer Personnel Act. The Naval Academy reestablished a permanent military professor program in 1997, but retiring officers do not receive a tombstone promotion.

==== Assistant judge advocates general of the Navy ====
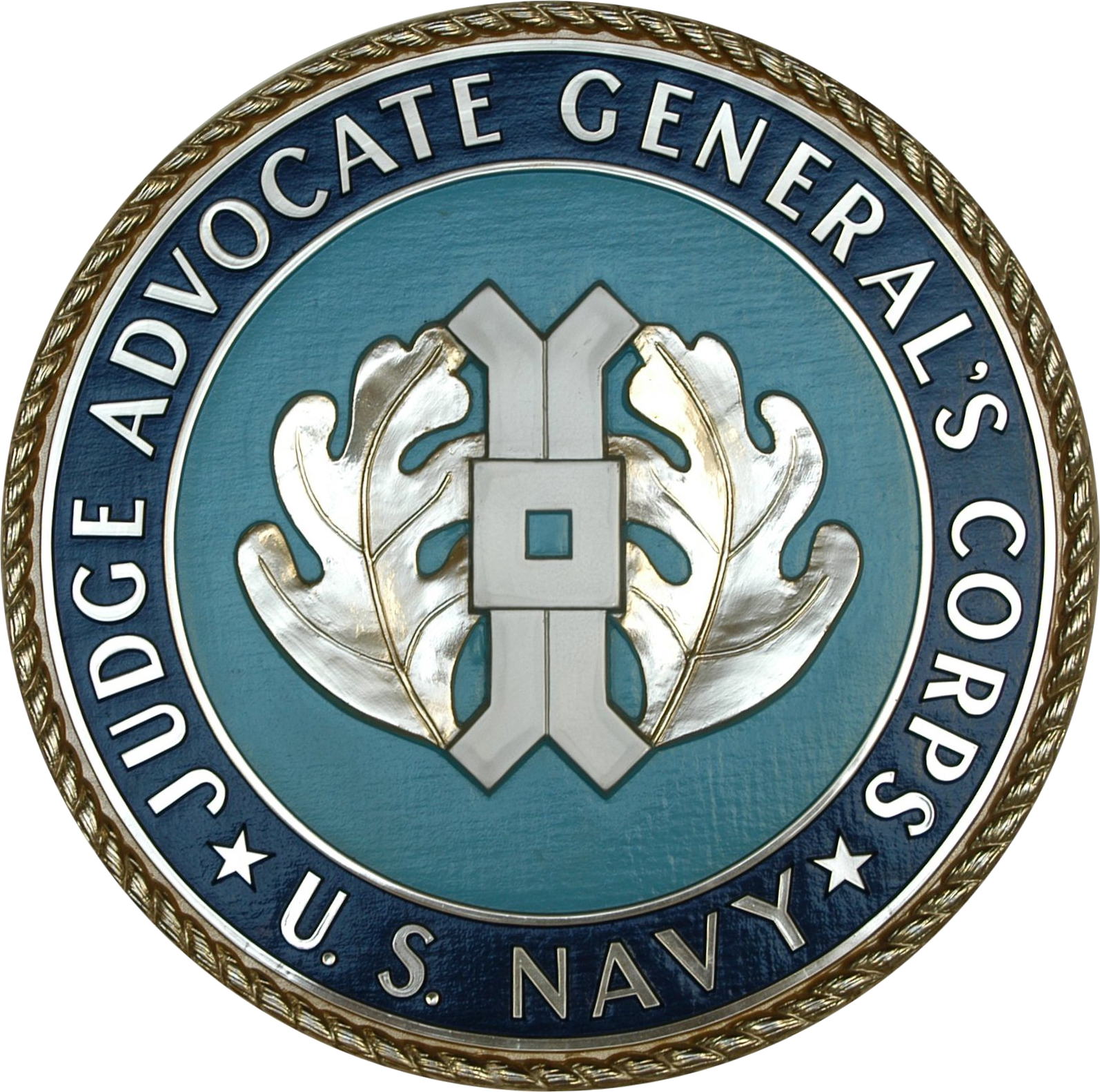
Assistant judge advocates general of the Navy can retire with a tombstone promotion to one-star admiral or general.

Upon completing one year in the role of Assistant Judge Advocate General (AJAG) of the Navy, AJAGs can retire as rear admirals (lower half) or brigadier generals. Until the passing of the National Defense Authorization Act for Fiscal Year 2017, AJAG tombstone promotions conferred the retired pay of the higher rank.

This arrangement stems from the legislative compromise that created the Navy Judge Advocate General's Corps (JAG Corps) in 1967. Before the act, there were already two statutory flag officer billets for the judge advocate general and deputy judge advocate general of the Navy. The House of Representatives passed a bill to establish the JAG Corps with two AJAGs of the Navy in the grades of rear admiral or brigadier general. Navy and Marine Corps line officers protested the decision, because flag and general officer billets could only be added to the JAG Corps by subtracting them from somewhere else, owing to a cap on the number of general and flag officers. To pass the Senate, the bill was amended to make the AJAG grades optional and to retire AJAGs as rear admirals or brigadier generals even if they served in lower grades.

Similar numerical limits on flag officer billets in 2008 led the Navy to establish the position of chief judge of the Navy as a designated AJAG in rotation for a tombstone promotion, rather than the active-duty one-star billet preferred by the study panel that had recommended its creation.

==== National Guard state ranks ====
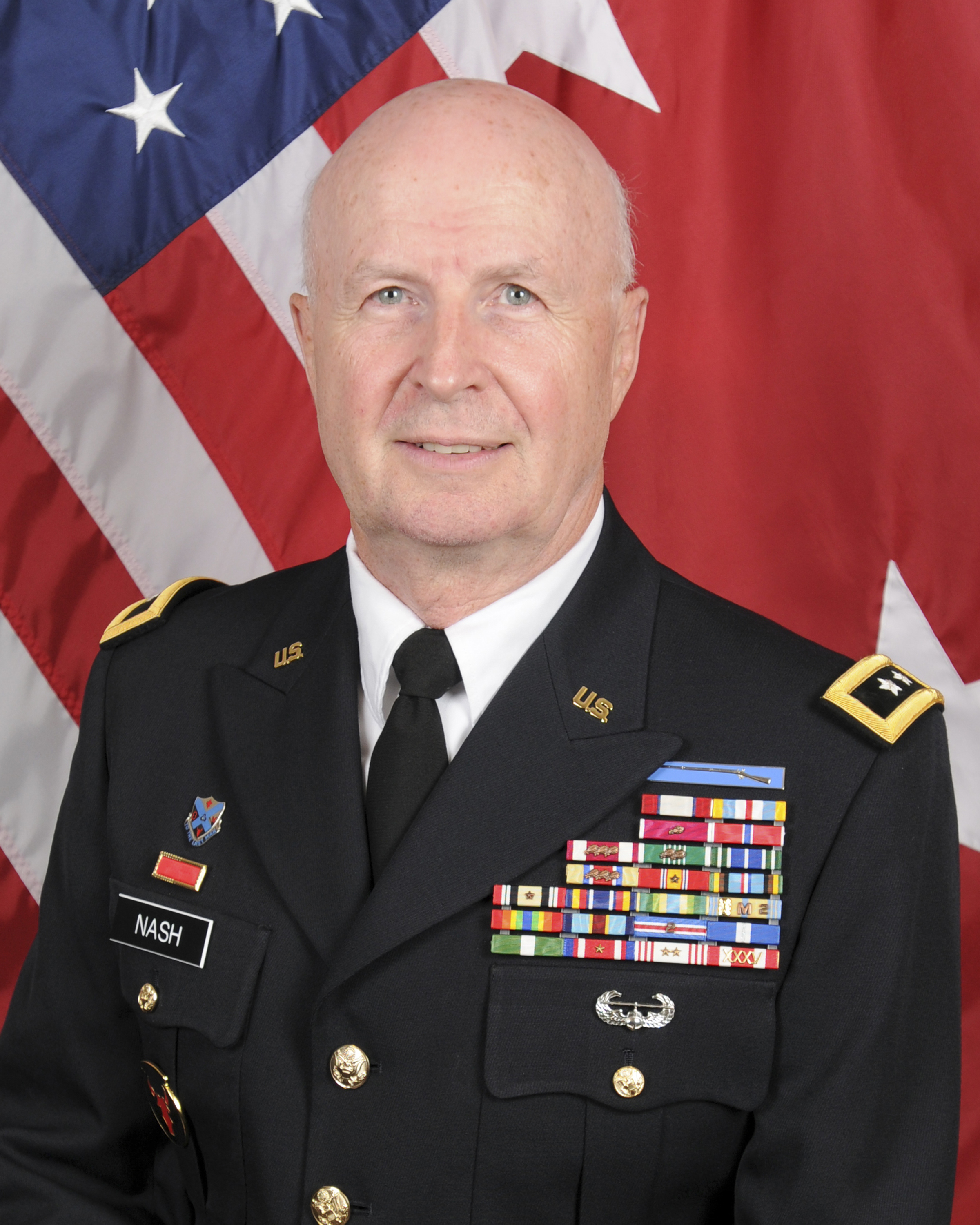
Minnesota National Guard adjutant general Richard C. Nash received a tombstone promotion to brevet lieutenant general in the state Guard.

Many states allow retiring National Guard officers with enough years of service to request a tombstone promotion to the next higher grade. Such a promotion is sometimes called a "wooden star" because it applies only within the state and is not federally recognized.

== Other examples ==
=== Russian Empire ===
In 1762, Peter III of Russia issued a manifesto to release the Russian nobility from obligatory state service, including a provision that allowed any noble to retire one rank higher in the Table of Ranks if they had served at least one year in the previous rank. Although nominally automatic, such promotions could be withheld at the sovereign's discretion, as when Peter III's successor, Catherine the Great, declined to promote a particular major general at retirement on the grounds that "She was above the Laws, and did not choose to grant him this reward."

By the Napoleonic Wars, officers received a one-grade promotion at retirement if they had served at least one year in their current rank, or five years in the case of colonels.

=== United Kingdom ===
Royal Navy officers retired with at least the pay of a higher rank as early as 1737, when 30 of the oldest lieutenants were pensioned off with the rank of lieutenant but the half-pay of a commander. Starting in 1796, senior lieutenants were retired in batches with both the rank and half-pay of a commander, and in 1830, lieutenants not in those batches were given the option to retire with the rank of commander but half-pay of a lieutenant. Batches of commanders were retired as superannuated captains starting in 1840, and batches of captains as superannuated rear admirals starting in 1846, in order to clear the active list of ancient veterans of the Napoleonic Wars.

The Royal Navy equivalent of a tombstone admiral was called a yellow admiral: a captain who retired with a commission as superannuated rear admiral that entitled him to the half-pay of a rear admiral but no further promotion or employment. Flag officers were divided by seniority into red, white, and blue squadrons until 1864, but a superannuated rear admiral was appointed without distinction of squadron and was sarcastically said to belong to a non-existent yellow squadron. Senior captains were commissioned as the first yellow admirals in 1747 so that more employable captains could be promoted past them. During the Napoleonic Wars, a captain had to have commanded a ship of the line in the current war to become an rear admiral on the active list, or in the previous war to retire as a yellow admiral. By 1891, any captain could retire as a rear admiral or even vice admiral if he had enough years of service.

During the Cold War, it was customary for the professional heads of the British Army, Royal Navy, and Royal Air Force to be promoted to the five-star ranks of field marshal, admiral of the fleet, or marshal of the Royal Air Force upon completing their terms as chiefs of their respective service staffs, either at retirement or upon elevation to chief of defence staff. Exceptions included first sea lord and chief of naval staff David Luce, who forfeited promotion to admiral of the fleet by resigning to protest the cancellation of the CVA-01 aircraft carrier program in 1966, and chief of general staff Peter Hunt, who declined promotion to field marshal when he retired in 1976 because he had presided over deep cutbacks in Army personnel during his term. End-of-term promotions to five-star ranks were stopped in 1995.

A substantive lieutenant colonel who has held an appointment as equerry to the sovereign for at least five years can retire with the honorary rank of colonel.

=== Brazil ===
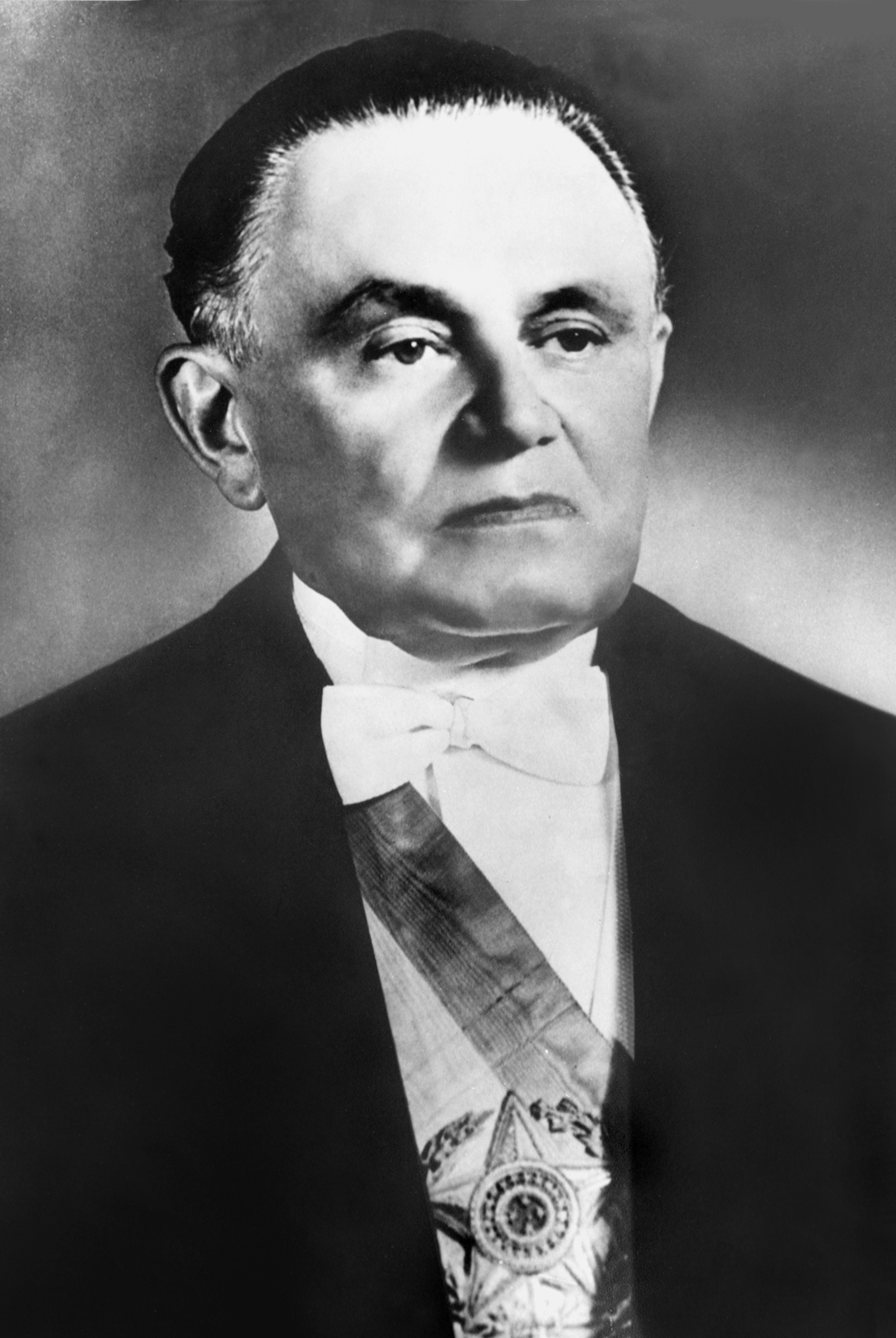
Humberto de Alencar Castelo Branco received a tombstone promotion to marshal the day before being inaugurated President of Brazil in 1964.

From the early 1800s, it was standard practice for Brazilian Army officers with at least 30 years of service to retire with the full pay of their highest grade and an honorary brevet, or graduado, promotion to the next higher grade. Officers retiring after 35 years of service received a substantive promotion to the next higher grade and its full pay. By 1925, officers could retire after 30 years with both the brevet rank and retired pay of the next higher grade, after 35 years with substantive promotion to the next higher grade, and after 40 years with substantive promotion to the next higher grade and brevet promotion to the grade above that.

In late 1928, retirement promotions were eliminated for all but the senior officer in each grade, who could retire with a one-grade promotion after 30 years, or a two-grade promotion after 40 years. This triggered a rush of retirement applications from officers with more than 30 years of service, severely depleting senior officer grades to the point that many jobs slated for colonels and lieutenant colonels had to be filled by majors.

Until 1966, the vast majority of Brazilian Army officers received a two-grade promotion at retirement. For example, three-star general de divisão Ademar de Queirós retired as a five-star marechal in November 1963. Army regulations granted one promotion at retirement for each of the following: more than 35 years of service, combat against the Communist uprising of 1935, and participation in World War II. Contemplating a hypothetical three-grade promotion from four-star general de exército, the highest active-duty rank, Army chief of staff Humberto de Alencar Castelo Branco joked, "Perhaps those of us who retire as generais de exército are to become 'Popes'." Castelo Branco called the practice absurd, but it persisted because the only living marechal to hold that rank on active duty, João Baptista Mascarenhas de Morais, had commanded the Brazilian Expeditionary Force during World War II and wanted to preserve tombstone promotions for his former soldiers. By 1971, over one hundred living retirees held the highest rank of marechal, all promoted to that rank at retirement.

Castelo Branco, who was himself advanced to marechal when he retired from the Army the day before being inaugurated President of Brazil on April 15, 1964, ordered an end to tombstone promotions on December 16, 1965, effective October 9, 1966. More than 4,000 commissioned and non-commissioned officers in the Brazilian military elected to keep their tombstone promotions by retiring early.

=== Sweden ===
In Sweden in older times, so-called honorary promotions (honnörsbefordran) often occurred in the form of promotion to higher ranks and sometimes to higher job classes upon retirement with a pension. In recent times, until the mid-1970s, such promotions have mainly been granted to general officers (flag officers) and salaried employees. The last time such a promotion occurred was in 1991 when Commanding Admiral of the Eastern Military District, Vice Admiral Bror Stefenson, was promoted to admiral after assuming his new position as Chief of His Majesty's Military Staff.

=== Pension spiking ===
A tombstone promotion can also refer to an end-of-career promotion to increase retirement benefits, better known as pension spiking. For example, in 1982 the New Jersey Police and Fireman's Retirement System changed its formula to calculate pensions based on their final year's pay, resulting in a slew of pre-retirement promotions that were estimated to increase average pensions by 10 percent.

== See also ==
- List of United States Navy tombstone admirals
- List of United States Navy tombstone vice admirals
- List of United States Coast Guard tombstone vice admirals
- List of United States Marine Corps tombstone lieutenant generals
