= Lloyd Chalker =

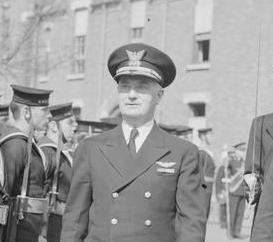
- Chalker in 1943
- Born: Lloyd Toulmin Chalker; December 4, 1883; Mobile, Alabama, U.S.
- Died: March 12, 1981 (aged 97); San Diego, California, U.S.
- Burial place: Arlington National Cemetery
- Spouse: Aline Brooks Chalker (née Risque)
- Military career
- Allegiance: United States
- Branch: Coast Guard
- Service years: 1903–1946
- Rank: Vice Admiral
- Awards: Legion of Merit

Lloyd Toulmin Chalker (December 4, 1883 – March 12, 1981) was an American naval officer who served as vice commandant of the United States Coast Guard and is credited as the "father of Coast Guard aviation".

== Early life and education ==
Chalker was born in Mobile, Alabama and entered the United States Coast Guard Academy, from which he graduated, in 1903.

== Career ==
During his early Coast Guard career, Chalker served on three Bering Sea ice patrols. In World War I he was posted to the Columbia-class protected cruiser USS Minneapolis and, following the war, was navigator of USS Von Steuben and commanding officer of the destroyer USS Ericsson. He later went on to command Coast Guard Destroyer Division One and the Coast Guard Destroyer Force.

From 1931 to 1934 Chalker was chief of personnel of the Coast Guard. On March 27, 1935 Chalker – then a commander – was given charge of Coast Guard Air Station Dinner Key. Four months later he was made head of Coast Guard Aviation. In 1939 Chalker represented the Coast Guard at an intra-government conference held in the office of General Hap Arnold (Note: Though it was held in Arnold's office, Arnold did not actually attend.) which was charged with setting performance standards for the U.S. government's future acquisition of helicopters; other agencies involved in the conference included the United States Army, United States Navy, United States Department of Agriculture, and the United States Department of the Interior.

During World War II Chalker served as Vice Commandant of the United States Coast Guard. During this time he resisted the acquisition of helicopters by the Coast Guard, a position supported by the Coast Guard's Engineer-in-Chief Rear Admiral Harvey Johnson, due to the expense of the aircraft and the limited utility of nascent helicopters in the prosecution of the war effort versus their significant cost. In 1942 he was principal speaker at the Miami Navy Day celebrations held at the Miami Orange Bowl.

He retired in 1946 and was advanced to the rank of vice admiral. In the year of his retirement he was invested into the Legion of Merit.

Chalker has been credited as the "father of Coast Guard aviation".

== Personal life ==
Chalker married Aline Brooks Risque with whom he had one daughter.

During retirement he moved from his longtime home in Chevy Chase, Maryland, to San Diego, California, to be closer to his daughter. He lived in San Diego until his death. He was interred at the Arlington National Cemetery on March 17, 1981.
