= Gerald F. Bogan =

US Navy aviator and vice admiral

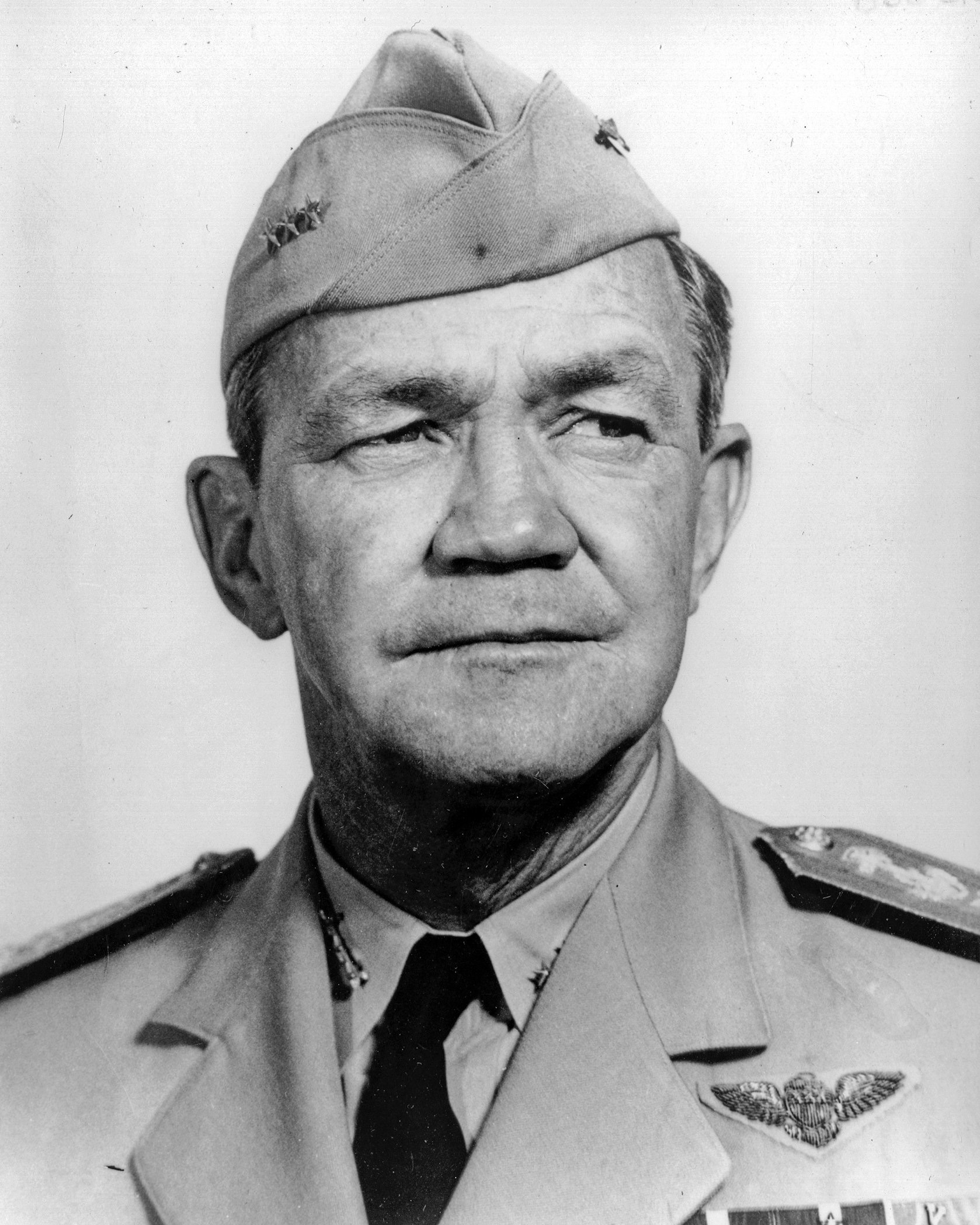
- Born: 27 July 1894; Mackinac Island, Michigan, U.S.
- Died: June 8, 1973 (aged 78); La Jolla, San Diego, California, U.S.
- Military career
- Allegiance: United States
- Branch: United States Navy
- Service years: 1916–50
- Rank: Vice Admiral
- Commands: United States First Fleet; Task Group 38.2; USS Saratoga
- Conflicts: World War I World War II
- Awards: Navy Cross; Navy Distinguished Service Medal (2); Legion of Merit

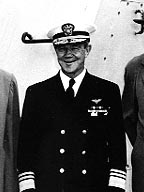
Bogan aboard USS Valley Forge (CV-45), April 1949

Gerald Francis Bogan (July 27, 1894 – June 8, 1973) was a United States Navy aviator and vice admiral who served in World War I and II.

== Biography ==
Gerald Francis Bogan was born July 27, 1894, in Mackinac Island, Michigan to Dr. James H. Bogan (1867–1936) and Katharine Nash-Bogan (1868–1958). He graduated from the United States Naval Academy in 1916. He served in World War I in convoy escort duty between the English Channel and Gibraltar. After the war he served on destroyers. In 1925 he trained to be a Naval Aviator. He was among the first aviators to land on an aircraft carrier.

Bogan served in the Pacific during World War II and was awarded the Navy Cross, two Navy Distinguished Service Medals, and the Legion of Merit with combat V device for actions during World War II.

=== Post–war ===
Bogan was promoted to vice admiral on February 2, 1946.

Bogan later authored a confidential memorandum that was leaked by Captain John G. Crommelin during the Revolt of the Admirals in September 1949. His memo described the situation in the Navy as follows: "The morale of the Navy is lower today than at any time since I entered the commissioned ranks in 1916 ... The situation deteriorates with each press release." The memorandum was endorsed in writing by Admiral Arthur W. Radford and Chief of Naval Operations Louis E. Denfeld. Bogan retired as a vice admiral in 1950 at age 55 rather than transfer from command of First Task Fleet in the Pacific to commander of Fleet Air at Jacksonville, a command normally filled by a Rear Admiral.

=== Post-Navy ===
In August 1963, Bogan was the captain of a 104-foot, $250,000, luxury yacht Freedom II when it sank in the Pacific Ocean 600 miles from California. The yacht was en route from Honolulu to San Diego. Bogan and six crew members were rescued by the submarine USS Razorback (SS-394). According to the crew, the yacht lost a wooden plank in its hull, causing it to flood and sink, though it was unclear what caused the loss of the plank.

Bogan died at Scripps Hospital in San Diego on June 8, 1973. He was survived by his wife Katherine, stepson Harold, his two sisters Eleanore and Dorothy and his brother, James.

Bogan was inducted into the Naval Aviation Hall of Honor, 1992.

== Commands ==
(incomplete)

- USS Saratoga (CV-3), 27 September 1942 – 7 April 1943
- TG 38.2 – CV – USS Intrepid (CV-11); CVLs – USS Cabot (CVL-28); USS Independence (CVL-22); 2 battleships, 3 cruisers, 18 destroyers.
- Commander, Air Force, Atlantic Fleet, February 1946 – December 1948.
- Commander First Fleet, 8 January 1949 – 1 February 1950.
