= List of United States Navy tombstone vice admirals =

This is a list of tombstone vice admirals in the United States Navy. A tombstone promotion transferred an officer to the retired list with the rank of the next higher grade. Tombstone promotions to vice admiral have been awarded for service during the construction of the Panama Canal and under the Appointments Clause of the United States Constitution, but almost all tombstone vice admirals were advanced to that rank between 1925 and 1959 because they were commended for performance of duty in actual combat before the end of World War II. Tombstone promotions for combat citations were halted on November 1, 1959.

== List of U.S. Navy tombstone vice admirals ==
Each entry lists the officer's name, date appointed rear admiral, date retired and advanced to vice admiral, and other biographical notes.

=== Panama Canal service ===
Following the completion of the Panama Canal in 1914, Congress authorized Army and Navy officers who had served more than three years with the Isthmian Canal Commission to be advanced one grade in rank upon retirement. Under this provision, Navy surgeon James F. Leys retired as a vice admiral in 1932, the first Navy staff corps officer to achieve that rank. Despite awarding Army engineer Edgar Jadwin the retired pay of a lieutenant general under almost identical circumstances, the Comptroller General of the United States denied Leys the retired pay of a vice admiral on the grounds that the grade had been abolished in 1890 and all subsequent vice admirals actually held the grade of rear admiral with only the temporary rank of vice admiral, so the grade of vice admiral did not exist. The Court of Claims overturned this decision and gave Leys the retired pay of a vice admiral.

==== Medical Corps ====
Name	Date appointed rear admiral	Date retired	Notes
James F. Leys	1 Jul 1931	1 Jan 1932	(1867–1938) First staff corps officer to attain rank.

=== Combat citations before the end of World War II ===
From 1925 to 1959, Navy rear admirals could retire with a tombstone promotion to the rank but not the pay of vice admiral, if they were specially commended for their performance of duty in actual combat before the end of World War II. Officers who were promoted to vice admiral while on the active list had precedence on the retired list over those who were advanced to that grade based on combat citations.

Tombstone promotions were based on an officer's grade on the day they actually retired, so a vice admiral could only receive a tombstone promotion to four-star admiral if he still held a three-star job when he retired. For example, when Gerald F. Bogan was relieved of his three-star command only three weeks before he was scheduled to retire with a tombstone promotion to admiral, he reverted to rear admiral and received a tombstone promotion back to vice admiral. Similarly, Robert C. Giffen was reprimanded for misconduct while serving as vice admiral, reverted to rear admiral, and retired with a tombstone promotion back to vice admiral.

By May 29, 1959, 154 out of 198 living retired vice admirals—78 percent—had never served in that rank on active duty. Only 22 percent had served in three-star positions prior to their retirement, the rest being rear admirals who received a tombstone promotion to vice admiral at retirement. Congress stopped all tombstone promotions effective November 1, 1959.

==== Line ====
Name	Date appointed rear admiral	Date retired	Notes
Harley H. Christy	27 Nov 1924	1 Oct 1934	(1870–1950)
Joseph K. Taussig	1 Jul 1931	1 Sep 1941	(1877–1947)
Clark H. Woodward	1 Jul 1931	1 Apr 1941	(1877–1967)
Charles E. Courtney	1 Sep 1932	1 Jul 1941	(1877–1966)
Alfred W. Johnson	1 Feb 1933	1 Dec 1940	(1876–1963)
Arthur P. Fairfield	1 Sep 1934	1 Nov 1941	(1877–1946)
Walter N. Vernou	1 Sep 1934	1 Mar 1942	(1878–1955)
Leigh Noyes	1 Jul 1939	1 Nov 1946	(1885–1961)
Robert C. Giffen	1 Oct 1941	1 Sep 1946	(1886–1962)
Francis W. Rockwell	10 Oct 1941	1 Aug 1948	(1886–1979)
John F. Shafroth Jr.	2 Nov 1941	1 Apr 1949	(1887–1967)
Olaf M. Hustvedt	20 Nov 1941	1 Mar 1945	(1886–1978)
Jules James	21 Nov 1941	Nov 1946	(1885–1957)
Alva D. Bernhard	23 Nov 1941	1 Nov 1946	(1886–1955)
Monroe Kelly	25 Nov 1941	Aug 1948	(1886–1956)
Lyal A. Davidson	30 Nov 1941	Jun 1946	(1886–1950)
Walden L. Ainsworth	2 Dec 1941	1 Dec 1948	(1886–1960)
Charles A. Pownall	3 Dec 1941	1 Nov 1949	(1887–1975)
Oliver M. Read	9 May 1942	1 Feb 1951	(1889–1972)
Calvin H. Cobb	10 May 1942	1 Nov 1946	(1889–1961)
Morton L. Deyo	13 May 1942	1 Aug 1949	(1887–1973)
Howard H. Good	14 May 1942	1 Sep 1950	(1888–1963)
Carleton H. Wright	15 May 1942	1 Oct 1948	(1892–1973)
Mahlon S. Tisdale	16 May 1942	1 Nov 1947	(1890–1972)
George H. Fort	16 May 1942	1 Sep 1953	(1891–1975)
Elliott Buckmaster	16 May 1942	1 Nov 1946	(1889–1976)
Charles P. Mason	16 May 1942	1 Apr 1946	(1891–1971)
Francis E. M. Whiting	16 May 1942	1 Aug 1947	(1891–1978)
J. Cary Jones Jr.	31 May 1942	1 Apr 1954	(1892–1977)
Arthur G. Robinson	16 Jun 1942	1 Jul 1951	(1892–1967)
Leo H. Thebaud	21 Jun 1942	1 Mar 1952	(1890–1980)
William K. Harrill	7 Jul 1942	1 Jun 1951	(1892–1962)
Charles E. Rosendahl	9 Jul 1942	1 Nov 1946	(1892–1977)
Wilder D. Baker	13 Jul 1942	1 Aug 1952	(1890–1975)
Frederick W. Pennoyer Jr.	21 Jul 1942	1 Jul 1950	(1892–1971)
Frank D. Wagner	25 Jul 1942	1 Jul 1950	(1893–1966)
Spencer S. Lewis	15 Aug 1942	Oct 1947	(1888–1952)
George L. Weyler	19 Aug 1942	1 Nov 1946	(1886–1971)
Edward W. Hanson	23 Aug 1942	Feb 1951	(1889–1959)
Frank J. Lowry	27 Aug 1942	Mar 1950	(1888–1955)
Aaron S. Merrill	9 Sep 1942	1 Nov 1947	(1890–1961)
Glenn B. Davis	17 Sep 1942	1 Jun 1953	(1892–1984)
Carleton F. Bryant	25 Sep 1942	1 May 1946	(1892–1987)
Theodore D. Ruddock Jr.	29 Sep 1942	1 Jul 1951	(1892–1989)
Carl H. Jones	7 Oct 1942	Nov 1946	(1893–1958)
Ralph O. Davis	11 Oct 1942	1 Jan 1953	(1891–1967)
Lloyd J. Wiltse	15 Oct 1942	1 Apr 1947	(1891–1984)
Allan E. Smith	5 Nov 1942	1 Feb 1954	(1892–1987)
Ralph W. Christie	9 Nov 1942	1 Aug 1949	(1893–1987)
Ralph E. Davison	17 Nov 1942	1 Jul 1948	(1895–1972)
Osborne B. Hardison	29 Nov 1942	Jan 1955	(1892–1959)
Gerald F. Bogan	7 Dec 1942	1 Feb 1950	(1894–1973)
Van H. Ragsdale	27 Dec 1942	Aug 1948	(1892–1953)
John Wilkes	1 Jan 1943	Jun 1951	(1895–1957)
Lawrence F. Reifsnider	6 Jan 1943	Dec 1949	(1887–1956)
Paul Hendren	11 Jan 1943	Aug 1949	(1889–1957)
Robert W. Hayler	16 Jan 1943	1 Jun 1951	(1891–1980)
John H. Brown Jr.	19 Jan 1943	1 Oct 1953	(1891–1963)
Willard A. Kitts III	25 Jan 1943	1 Jul 1951	(1894–1964)
Bertram J. Rodgers	28 Jan 1943	1 Apr 1956	(1894–1983)
Frank E. Beatty Jr.	31 Jan 1943	1 Jun 1951	(1894–1976)
Thomas R. Cooley	20 Mar 1943	Jun 1952	(1893–1959)
Allan R. McCann	25 Mar 1943	1 May 1950	(1896–1978)
Edmund W. Burrough	11 Apr 1943	1 Nov 1952	(1890–1962)
Vincent R. Murphy	11 Apr 1943	1 Nov 1946	(1896–1974)
Henry S. Kendall	15 May 1943	1 Jun 1952	(1896–1963)
Clifton A. F. Sprague	17 May 1943	1 Nov 1951	(1896–1955)
Ralph S. Riggs	16 Jun 1943	1 Aug 1951	(1895–1981)
George R. Henderson	1 Jul 1943	1 Aug 1954	(1893–1964)
Leslie C. Stevens	3 Jul 1943	Aug 1951	(1895–1956)
Carl F. Holden	10 Aug 1943	Jun 1952	(1895–1953)
Marshall R. Greer	28 Aug 1943	1 Jul 1953	(1896–1981)
Ralph E. Jennings	5 Sep 1943	1 Jul 1953	(1897–1971)
Harvey E. Overesch	22 Sep 1943	1 May 1946	(1893–1973)
Fred D. Kirtland	22 Sep 1943	1 Jun 1951	(1892–1972)
Thomas B. Inglis	23 Sep 1943	1 Jan 1952	(1897–1984)
Albert M. Bledsoe	23 Sep 1943	1 Sep 1958	(1896–1981)
George C. Dyer	24 Sep 1943	1 Feb 1955	(1898–1987)
Homer N. Wallin	1 Oct 1943	1 May 1955	(1893–1984) Engineering Duty Officer
Emmet P. Forrestel	3 Oct 1943	1 Nov 1959	(1897–1979)
Charles B. Momsen	6 Oct 1943	1 Sep 1955	(1896–1967)
Ernest W. Litch Jr.	9 Oct 1943	1 Jul 1954	(1897–1967)
Felix L. Johnson	10 Oct 1943	1 Sep 1952	(1897–1981)
John Perry	19 Oct 1943	1 Feb 1959	(1897–1972)
Dixwell Ketcham	29 Nov 1943	1 Nov 1949	(1899–1993)
William G. Tomlinson	22 Dec 1943	1 May 1952	(1897–1972)
Richard F. Whitehead	17 Jan 1944	1 Jun 1955	(1894–1993)
Ralph E. McShane	25 Feb 1944	1 Aug 1954	(1899–1982) Engineering Duty Officer
Joseph F. Bolger	2 Mar 1944	1 Oct 1953	(1898–1985)
Oswald S. Colclough	2 Mar 1944	1 Feb 1950	(1898–1981)
John H. Carson	4 Mar 1944	1 May 1958	(1896–1976)
Ernest H. von Heimburg	4 Mar 1944	1 Jul 1958	(1896–1976)
John R. Redman	4 Mar 1944	1 Oct 1957	(1898–1970)
Eliot H. Bryant	4 Mar 1944	Aug 1948	(1896–1955)
James H. Foskett	4 Mar 1944	1 Jul 1954	(1898–1961)
Francis P. Old	4 Mar 1944	1 Feb 1954	(1897–1963)
Heber H. McLean	4 Mar 1944	1 Dec 1954	(1899–1971)
Richard H. Cruzen	1 Apr 1944	1 Jun 1954	(1897–1970)
Edward C. Ewen	21 Jul 1944	1957	(1897–1959)
Robert P. McConnell	25 Jul 1944	1 Jul 1953	(1895–1973)
Wendell G. Switzer	25 Jul 1944	1 Apr 1959	(1898–1970)
William D. Johnson	5 Aug 1944	1 Jun 1956	(1897–1967)
John M. Hoskins	15 Aug 1944	1 Jul 1957	(1898–1964)
Frank L. Lowe	1 Aug 1945	1 Aug 1945	(1891–1963)
James E. Maher	7 Aug 1947	1 Jul 1953	(1892–1967)
Leon S. Fiske	7 Aug 1947	1 Jul 1953	(1894–1980)
Harry R. Thurber	7 Aug 1947	1 Jul 1953	(1895–1967)
John E. Whelchel	7 Aug 1947	1 Aug 1949	(1898–1973)
Lucian A. Moebus	7 Aug 1947	1 Nov 1952	(1900–1990)
James H. Doyle	7 Aug 1947	1 Nov 1953	(1897–1982)
Francis X. McInerney	1 Sep 1947	Jun 1955	(1899–1956)
Robert F. Hickey	1 Oct 1947	1 Jul 1959	(1897–1980)
Thomas H. Binford	1 Mar 1948	1 Jun 1954	(1896–1973)
Walter E. Moore	28 Mar 1948	1 Mar 1959	(1900–1977)
Burton B. Biggs	1 May 1948	1 Oct 1958	(1898–1967)
Lyman A. Thackray	1 May 1948	Sep 1952	(1897–1955)
Jack H. Duncan	1 Jul 1948	1 Jul 1948	(1894–1966)
Walter G. Schindler	1 Jul 1948	1 Oct 1959	(1897–1991)
Milton E. Miles	1 Jul 1948	1 Feb 1958	(1900–1961)
Harold D. Baker	1 Jul 1948	1 Nov 1958	(1899–1982)
Thomas M. Stokes	1 Aug 1948	1 Jul 1956	(1899–1989)
Robert E. Blick Jr.	1 Aug 1948	1 Jul 1957	(1899–1972)
Tom B. Hill	1 Mar 1949	1955	(1898–1957)
John P. Whitney	1 Apr 1949	1 Mar 1955	(1900–1974)
Hugh H. Goodwin	1 Apr 1949	1 Jun 1957	(1900–1980)
Edgar A. Cruise	1 Apr 1949	1 Nov 1959	(1899–1990)
Leland P. Lovette	30 Jun 1949	1 Jul 1949	(1897–1967)
Thomas B. Brittain	1 Aug 1949	1 Feb 1955	(1898–1974)
Herbert S. Duckworth	1 Feb 1950	1 Sep 1952	(1900–1990)
George R. Cooper	1 Mar 1950	1 Apr 1955	(1901–1967)
Harry B. Jarrett	1 Mar 1950	1 Nov 1954	(1898–1974)
Frank T. Ward Jr.	1 May 1950	1 Aug 1958	(1901–1976)
William V. O'Regan	1 Jul 1950	1 Jul 1958	(1900–1978)
Marion E. Murphy	1 Jan 1951	1 May 1957	(1899–1981)
Howard E. Orem	1 Jan 1951	1 May 1957	(1900–1995)
Harry Sanders	1 Jan 1951	1 May 1957	(1901–1991)
Richard W. Ruble	1 Jan 1951	1 Aug 1955	(1902–1976)
Stanhope C. Ring	1 Jan 1951	1 Nov 1955	(1902–1963)
Charles F. Coe	1 Jan 1951	1 May 1954	(1901–1974)
Thomas B. Williamson	1 Jan 1951	1 Jul 1958	(1902–1982)
Frederick M. Trapnell	1 Jan 1951	1 Oct 1952	(1902–1975)
Bernard E. Manseau	1 Jun 1951	3 Apr 1957	(1899–1957) Engineering Duty Officer
Ralph Earle Jr.	1 Jun 1951	1 Jul 1957	(1900–2000)
Selden B. Spangler	1 Jun 1951	1 Jul 1958	(1900–1982)
Frederick Moosbrugger	1 Jun 1951	1 Oct 1956	(1900–1974)
John B. Moss	1 Jul 1951	1 Sep 1953	(1901–1961)
Irving T. Duke	1 Jul 1951	1 Dec 1957	(1901–1979)
Truman J. Hedding	1 Jul 1951	1 Jan 1959	(1902–1995)
Chester C. Wood	1 Jul 1951	1 Jul 1959	(1903–1965)
Charles W. Wilkins	1 Jul 1951	1 Jan 1958	(1902–1985)
Alvin D. Chandler	1 Jul 1951	1 Nov 1951	(1902–1987)
Ephraim R. McLean Jr.	1 Aug 1951	1 Mar 1959	(1903–1985)
Richard F. Stout	1 Aug 1951	1 Jul 1959	(1902–1982)
Marcel E. A. Gouin	1 Nov 1951	Aug 1954	(1900–1960)
Aurelius B. Vosseller	1 Nov 1951	1 Sep 1956	(1903–1981)
Henry C. Daniel	1 Jan 1952	1 Apr 1959	(1903–1987)
Thomas C. Ragan	1 Jan 1952	1 Apr 1959	(1904–1990)
John C. Daniel	1 Mar 1952	1 Oct 1959	(1899–1992)
Victor D. Long	1 Jul 1952	1 Oct 1959	(1904–2002)
Henry C. Crommelin	1 Jul 1952	1 Nov 1959	(1904–1971)
George C. Wright	1 Oct 1952	1 Mar 1958	(1902–1967)
Ira E. Hobbs	1 Feb 1953	1 Jun 1959	(1901–1977)
Charles F. Chillingworth Jr.	1 Jun 1953	1 Aug 1956	(1903–1976)
Chester C. Smith	1 Jul 1953	1 Jan 1959	(1905–1976)
Harold O. Larson	1 Sep 1953	1 Nov 1959	(1903–1997)
William G. Beecher Jr.	1 Oct 1953	1 Aug 1955	(1904–1973)
Albert E. Jarrell	1 Oct 1953	1 Oct 1959	(1901–1977)
Delbert S. Cornwell	1 Jun 1954	1 Jul 1957	(1900–1974)
William J. Marshall	1 Jul 1954	1 May 1959	(1903–1983)
James H. Ward	1 Jul 1954	1 Jul 1959	(1902–1971)
Robert H. Rice	1 Nov 1954	1 Aug 1957	(1903–1994)
Harry E. Sears	1 Jan 1956	1 Aug 1958	(1906–1998)
James H. Flatley Jr.	1 Dec 1957	2 Jun 1958	(1906–1958)
Apollo Soucek	18 Jun 1953	Jul 1955	(1897-1955)

==== Line (Reserve) ====
Name	Date appointed rear admiral	Date retired	Notes
Edward O. McDonnell	7 Dec 1942	Dec 1951	(1891–1960) Awarded Medal of Honor, 1914.
Paul F. Foster	21 Jan 1944	1 Dec 1946	(1889–1972) Awarded Medal of Honor, 1914.
Edward C. Holden Jr.	1 Apr 1952	1 Feb 1958	(1896–1970)
William A. Read	1 Apr 1952	1 Sep 1957	(1895–1976)
George M. Wauchope	1 Jul 1953	1 Nov 1959	(1899–1978)
George A. Parkinson	1 Jul 1954	1 Apr 1959	(1899–1983)
Ralph S. Moore	Jun 1955	1956	(1896–1958)
Roger W. Cutler	2 Nov 1945	1 Dec 1955	(1889–1963)

==== Medical Corps ====
Name	Date appointed rear admiral	Date retired	Notes
Middleton S. Elliott	2 Jun 1927	Nov 1936	(1872–1952) Awarded Medal of Honor, 1914.
Joel T. Boone	20 May 1942	1 Dec 1950	(1889–1974) Awarded Medal of Honor, 1918.
Morton D. Willcutts	15 Jul 1942	1 Apr 1951	(1889–1976)
Clarence J. Brown	15 Jul 1942	1 May 1954	(1895–1973)
Paul M. Albright	15 Jul 1942	1 May 1953	(1894–1967)
William Chambers	15 Sep 1942	1 Nov 1946	(1884–1951)
Carl A. Broaddus	1 Apr 1944	1 Aug 1952	(1894–1969)
Joseph B. Logue	1 Apr 1944	1 Feb 1954	(1895–1986)
Warwick T. Brown	1 Apr 1949	1 Apr 1952	(1890–1960)
Frederick C. Greaves	1 Apr 1949	1 Jul 1958	(1896–1973)
Robert M. Gillett	1 Apr 1949	1 Mar 1958	(1896–1987)
Ocie B. Morrison Jr.	1 Apr 1952	1 Dec 1958	(1896–1969)
French R. Moore	1 Apr 1952	1 Dec 1958	(1897–1983)
Thomas F. Cooper	1 Apr 1952	1 Jun 1959	(1899–1976)

==== Supply Corps ====
Name	Date appointed rear admiral	Date retired	Notes
Everett G. Morsell	15 Sep 1942	1 Aug 1946	(1884–1970)
Archie A. Antrim	11 Sep 1943	1 Apr 1956	(1894–1985)
Stephen R. Edson	17 Jan 1944	1 Sep 1957	(1895–1969)
Robert F. Batchelder	1 Jul 1949	1 Apr 1957	(1895–1973)

==== Chaplain Corps (Reserve) ====
Name	Date appointed rear admiral	Date retired	Notes
Maurice S. Sheehy	1954	1 May 1958	(1898–1972)

==== Civil Engineer Corps ====
Name	Date appointed rear admiral	Date retired	Notes
John J. Manning	15 Jul 1942	1 Dec 1949	(1894–1962)
William M. Angas	1 Jan 1943	1 May 1950	(1892–1960)
Andrew G. Bisset	1 Jan 1943	1 Jul 1950	(1893–1976)
Harold W. Johnson	16 Jun 1943	1 Jul 1956	(1894–1972)
William O. Hiltabidle Jr.	11 Sep 1943	1 Nov 1952	(1896–1986)
Wallace B. Short	1 Apr 1955	1 Nov 1959	(1903–2007)
Albert J. Fay	1 Jul 1956	1 Jul 1959	(1905–1998)

==== Civil Engineer Corps (Reserve) ====
Name	Date appointed rear admiral	Date retired	Notes
Robert C. Johnson	1 Apr 1952	1 Oct 1956	(1894–1969)
Roy M. Harris	1 Jul 1955	1 Mar 1958	(1901–1985)
Francis M. McCarthy	1 Jul 1955	1 Nov 1959	(1899–1971)

==== Dental Corps ====
Name	Date appointed rear admiral	Date retired	Notes
Alexander G. Lyle	10 Mar 1943	Aug 1948	(1889–1955) Awarded Medal of Honor, 1918.

=== Appointments Clause ===
The President can use his plenary power under the Appointments Clause of the United States Constitution to nominate any officer to be retired in a higher grade, subject to Senate confirmation. For example, John D. Bulkeley served as president of the Board of Inspection and Survey for 21 years, having been retired in 1974 but immediately recalled to active duty, and was advanced to vice admiral on the retired list under the Appointments Clause when he retired permanently in August 1988. Levering Smith served as technical director or program head of the Navy's submarine-launched ballistic missile program for 20 years, having also been retired and recalled to active duty in 1974, and was promoted to vice admiral when he finally stepped down in November 1977.

==== Line ====
Name	Date appointed rear admiral	Date retired permanently	Notes
Levering Smith	1 Apr 1963	15 Nov 1977	(1910–1993) Ordnance Engineering Duty Officer
John D. Bulkeley	1 Feb 1964	31 Aug 1988	(1911–1996) Awarded Medal of Honor, 1942.

== Legislative history ==
The following list of Congressional legislation concerns tombstone promotions to the grade of vice admiral in the United States Navy. Each entry lists an act of Congress, its citation in the United States Statutes at Large, and a summary of the act's relevance.

Legislation	Citation	Summary
Act of March 4, 1915	38 Stat. 1191	Authorized officers who served more than three years in Panama with the Isthmian Canal Commission to be advanced one grade in rank upon retirement.
Act of March 4, 1925	43 Stat. 1279	Authorized officers who were specially commended for performance of duty in actual combat during World War I, and who retired because of ineligibility for promotion due to age, to be placed on the retired list with the rank of the next higher grade and three-fourths of the active-duty pay of the grade in which serving at the time of retirement.
Act of June 23, 1938	52 Stat. 951	Authorized line officers who were specially commended for performance of duty in actual combat, to be placed on the retired list with the rank of the next higher grade and three-fourths of the active-duty pay of the grade in which serving at the time of retirement.
Act of June 25, 1938	52 Stat. 1183	Authorized Naval Reservists who were specially commended for performance of duty in actual combat, to be advanced to the next higher grade when placed on the honorary retired list, with no pay unless they were on active duty for ten of the eleven years preceding retirement, in which case they received 50 percent of the active-duty pay of the grade in which serving at the time of retirement.
Act of February 23, 1942	56 Stat. 120	Authorized officers who were specially commended for performance of duty in actual combat, and who retired before June 23, 1938, to be advanced on the retired list to the rank of the next higher grade and three-fourths of the active-duty pay of the grade in which serving at the time of retirement.; Authorized staff officers who were specially commended for performance of duty in actual combat, and who retired on or after June 23, 1938, to be advanced on the retired list to the rank but not the pay of the next higher grade.
Act of August 7, 1947 [Officer Personnel Act of 1947]	61 Stat. 874; 61 Stat. 875	Authorized officers who were specially commended for performance of duty in actual combat on or before December 31, 1946, to be placed on the retired list with (or advanced on the retired list to) the rank of the next higher grade and three-fourths of the active-duty pay of the grade in which serving at the time of retirement.; Repealed authorization for Naval Reservists who were specially commended for performance in duty in actual combat, to be advanced to the next higher grade when placed on the honorary retired list, if the duty was performed after December 31, 1946.
Act of October 12, 1949 [Career Compensation Act of 1949]	63 Stat. 835; 63 Stat. 836	Repealed authorization for officers who were specially commended for performance of duty in actual combat, to retire with three-fourths of the active-duty pay of the grade in which serving at the time of retirement.
Act of August 11, 1959	73 Stat. 337	Repealed authorization for officers who were specially commended for performance of duty in actual combat, to retire with the rank of the next higher grade, effective November 1, 1959.

== See also ==
- List of United States Navy tombstone admirals
- List of United States Navy vice admirals on active duty before 1960
- Vice admiral (United States)

== General and cited references ==
- U.S. Naval Officers, Vice Admiral and Above, 1864–1963, Washington, D.C.: Navy Office of Information, Internal Relations Division, 1963, OCLC 11685515
- Register of the Commissioned and Warrant Officers of the United States Navy and Marine Corps, Washington, D.C.: Government Printing Office, 1916–1960
- Modern Biographical Files, Navy Department Library
- VADM Civil Engineer Corps Officers List (PDF), U.S. Navy Seabee Museum, Naval History and Heritage Command
- Supply Corps Vice Admirals - A History, Navy Supply Corps Newsletter
