= Vice admiral (United States) =

Three-star commissioned naval officer

- Flag of the vice admiral of the Unrestricted Line, United States Navy

- The shoulder stars, shoulder boards, and sleeve stripes of a U.S. Navy vice admiral of the "line"
- Country: United States of America
- Service branch: United States Navy; United States Coast Guard; United States Public Health Service Commissioned Corps; NOAA Commissioned Officer Corps; US Maritime Service
- Abbreviation: VADM
- Rank group: Officer
- Rank: Three-star
- NATO rank code: OF-8
- Pay grade: O-9
- Formation: 1864; 162 years ago
- Next higher rank: Admiral
- Next lower rank: Rear admiral
- Equivalent ranks: Lieutenant general (uniformed services of the United States)

Vice admiral (abbreviated as VADM) is a three-star commissioned officer rank in the United States Navy, the United States Coast Guard, the United States Public Health Service Commissioned Corps, the National Oceanic and Atmospheric Administration Commissioned Officer Corps, and the United States Maritime Service, with the pay grade of O-9. Vice admiral ranks above rear admiral and below admiral. Vice admiral is equivalent to the rank of lieutenant general in the other uniformed services.

== Statutory limits ==
United States Code explicitly limits the total number of vice admirals that may be on active duty at any given time.

=== U.S. Navy ===
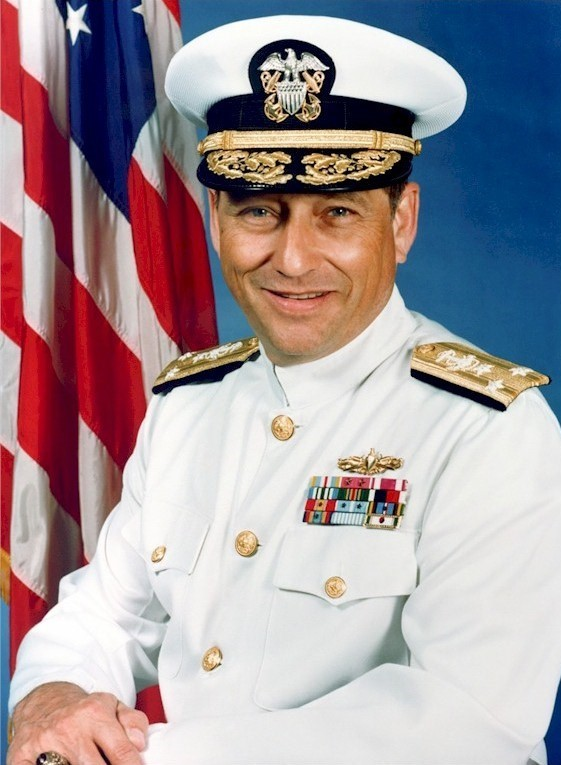
U.S. Navy Vice Admiral Thomas Kinnebrew with the Navy's three-star shoulder board insignia

The total number of active-duty flag officers is capped at 162 for the U.S. Navy. For the Navy, no more than 20% of the service's active-duty flag officers may have more than two stars. Some of these slots can be reserved by statute. Officers serving in certain Defense Agency Director positions such as the Director of the Defense Logistics Agency (DLA), when filled by a naval officer, are vice admirals. The Superintendent of the United States Naval Academy is usually a vice admiral, either upon nomination or shortly thereafter. The President may also add vice admirals to the Navy if they are offset by removing an equivalent number of three-star officers from other services. Finally, all statutory limits may be waived at the President's discretion during time of war or national emergency.

=== U.S. Coast Guard ===
By statute, no more than five vice admiral positions may exist in the Coast Guard and, if there are five, one must be the chief of staff of the Coast Guard.

=== U.S. Public Health Service Commissioned Corps ===
By statute, the only U.S. Public Health Service Commissioned Corps officer who holds the rank of vice admiral is the officer serving as the surgeon general of the United States.

=== NOAA Commissioned Officer Corps ===
Although the rank of vice admiral exists in the NOAA Corps, its use is rare. Only three officers of the NOAA Corps or its ancestor organizations have reached the rank of vice admiral.

=== U.S. Maritime Service ===
While the Maritime Service has not been structurally organized since 1954, remnants of the service still commission officers for federal uniformed service, under the authority of the secretary of transportation and the president, to serve as administrators and instructors at the U.S. Merchant Marine Academy. Occasionally, the superintendent of the academy is appointed to the rank vice admiral due to their longevity in the position, or for prior military experience. The superintendent also get a flag with the anchor and wreath in the canton (upper left) and three white stars across the bottom.

== Appointment and tour length ==
The three-star grade goes hand-in-hand with the position or office it is linked to, so the rank is temporary. Officers may only achieve three-star grade if they are appointed to positions that require the officer to hold such a rank. Their rank expires with the expiration of their term of office, which is usually set by statute. Vice admirals are nominated for appointment by the President from any eligible officers holding the rank of rear admiral (lower half) or above, who also meet the requirements for the position, under the advice or suggestion of the Secretary of Defense, the applicable service secretary, or the Chairman of the Joint Chiefs of Staff. The nominee must be confirmed via majority vote by the Senate before the appointee can take office and thus assume the rank. The standard tour length for most vice admiral positions is three years but some are set four or more years by statute.

Extensions of the standard tour length can be approved, within statutory limits, by their respective service secretaries, the Secretary of Defense, the President or Congress but these are rare, as they block other officers from being promoted. Some statutory limits under the U.S. Code can be waived in times of national emergency or war. Three-star ranks may also be given by act of Congress but this is extremely rare.

== Retirement ==
Other than voluntary retirement, statute sets a number of mandates for retirement. Three-star officers must retire after 38 years of service unless appointed for promotion or reappointed to grade to serve longer. Otherwise all flag officers must retire the month after their 64th birthday. The Secretary of Defense, however, can defer a three-star officer's retirement until the officer's 66th birthday and the president can defer it until the officer's 68th birthday.

Flag officers typically retire well in advance of the statutory age and service limits, so as not to impede the upward career mobility of their juniors. Since there is a finite number of three-star slots available to each service, typically one officer must leave office before another can be promoted. Maintaining a three-star rank is a game of musical chairs; once an officer vacates a position bearing that rank, the officer must be appointed or reappointed to a job of equal or higher importance within 60 days or involuntarily retires. Historically, officers leaving three-star positions were allowed to revert to their permanent two-star ranks to mark time in lesser jobs until statutory retirement, but now such officers are expected to retire immediately to avoid obstructing the promotion flow.

== Gallery ==
U.S. Navy, U.S. Coast Guard, U.S. Public Health Service, NOAA Corps, and U.S. Maritime Service shoulder insignia

The collar stars, shoulder boards, and sleeve stripes of a United States Coast Guard vice admiral

The collar stars, shoulder boards, and sleeve stripes of a United States Public Health Service Commissioned Corps vice admiral

The collar stars, shoulder boards, and sleeve stripes of a National Oceanic and Atmospheric Administration Commissioned Officer Corps vice admiral

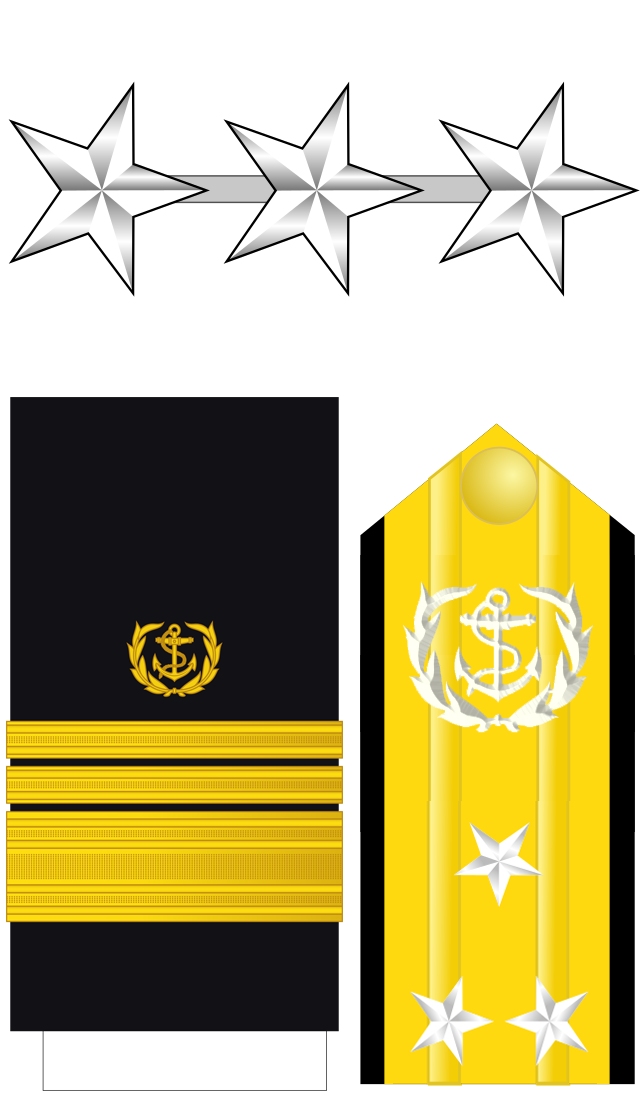
The collar stars, shoulder boards, and sleeve stripes of a United States Maritime Service vice admiral
Rank flag of a U.S. Coast Guard vice admiral (unrestricted line officer)

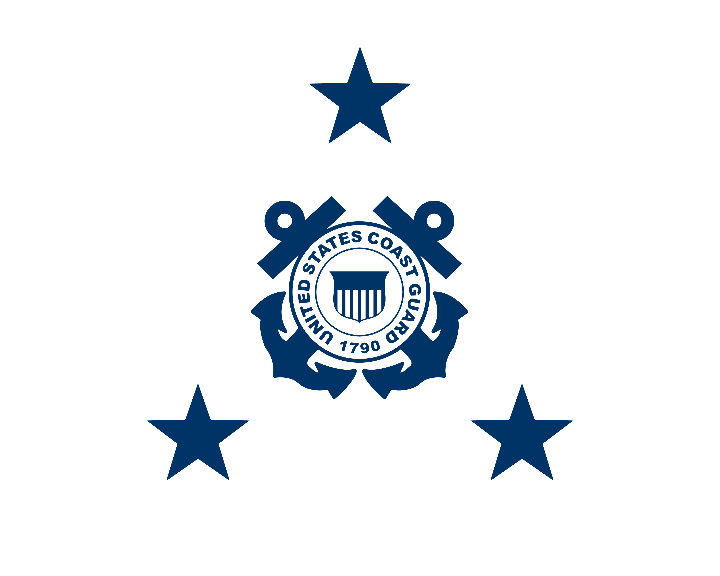
Flag of a US Coast Guard Restricted Line Officer / Staff Officer Vice Admiral

Rank flag of a U.S. Public Health Service Commissioned Corps vice admiral (serves as Surgeon General of the United States)

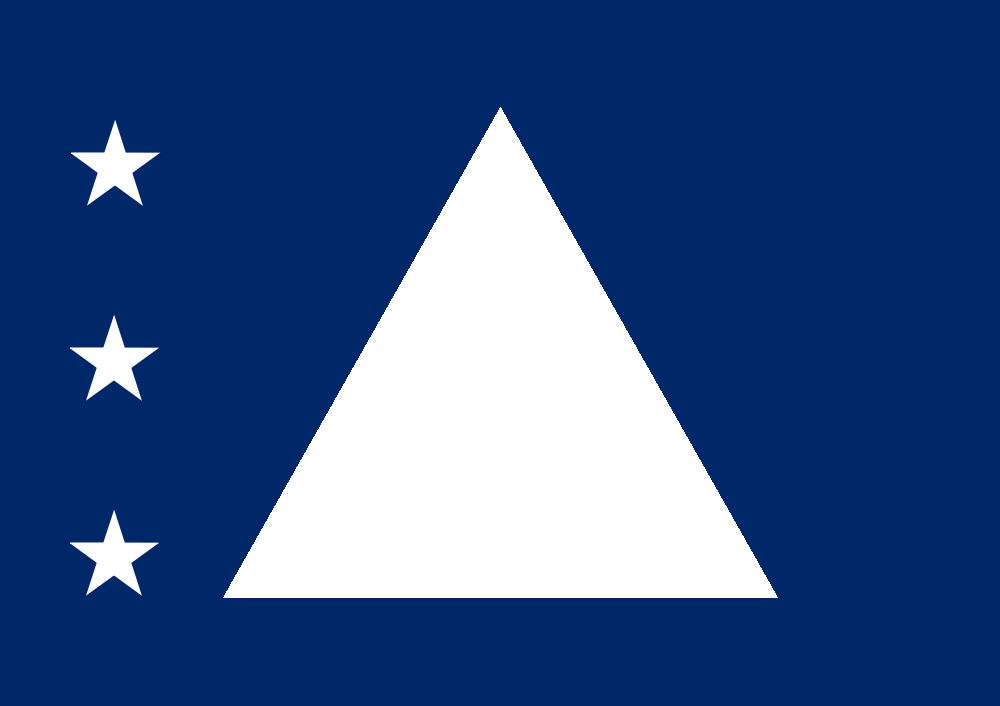
Rank flag of a NOAA Commissioned Officer Corps vice admiral

Flag of a US Navy Restricted Line Officer / Staff Officer Vice Admiral

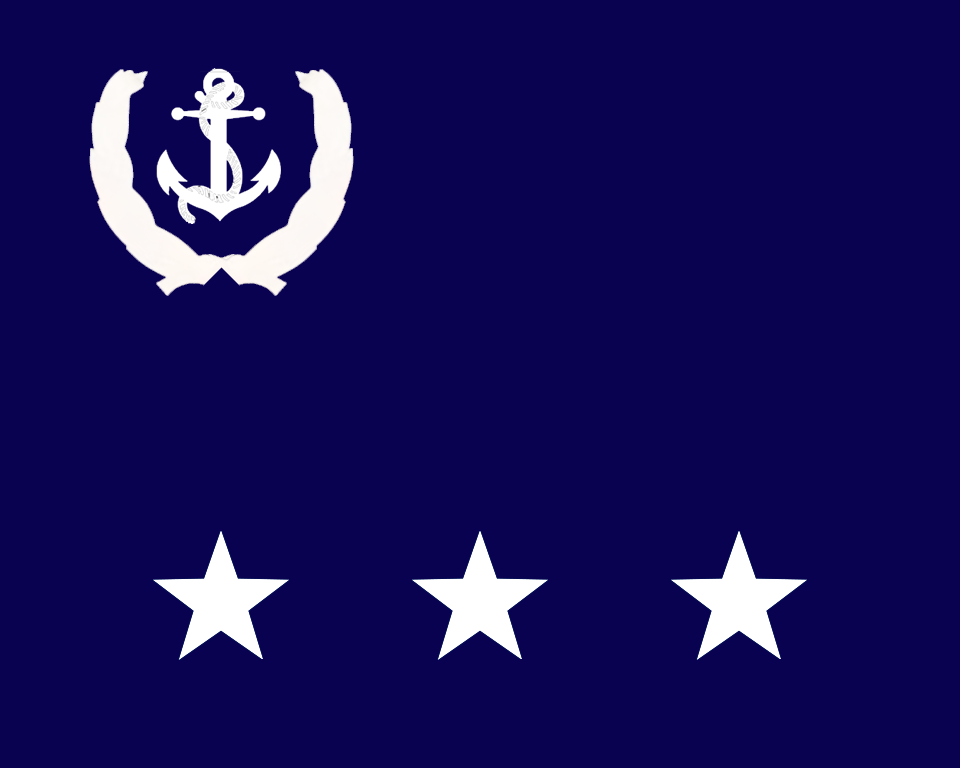
Flag of USMS Vice Admiral (Superintendent of USMMA)

== See also ==
- List of active duty United States three-star officers
- List of United States Navy vice admirals on active duty before 1960
- List of United States Navy vice admirals from 2000 to 2009
- List of United States Navy vice admirals from 2010 to 2019
- List of United States Navy vice admirals since 2020
- List of United States Navy tombstone vice admirals
- List of United States Coast Guard vice admirals
- List of United States Coast Guard tombstone vice admirals
- U.S. Navy officer rank insignia
