= Erroll M. Brown =

US Coast Guard officer

Errol M. Brown
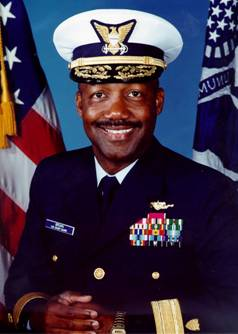
- Official United States Coast Guard portrait.
- Born: 1950 (age 75–76); Ocklawaha, Florida
- Education: University of Michigan
- Military career
- Allegiance: United States of America
- Branch: United States Coast Guard
- Service years: 1967–2005
- Rank: Rear Admiral
- Commands: Commander, 13th Coast Guard District Commander, Integrated Support Command, Portsmouth, VA Commander, Maintenance and Logistics Command, Atlantic
- Awards: Legion of Merit; Meritorious Service Medal (2); Secretary of Transportation Outstanding Achievement Medal; Coast Guard Commendation Medal (2); Secretary of Transportation Outstanding Unit Award; Coast Guard Unit Commendation

Erroll Mingo Brown is a retired rear admiral in the United States Coast Guard. Brown was the first African-American promoted to flag rank in the Coast Guard.

== Education ==
After graduating from Dixie M. Hollins High School in St. Petersburg, Florida, in 1968, Brown enrolled in the U.S. Coast Guard Academy. In 1972, Brown graduated from the U.S. Coast Guard Academy, majoring in Marine Engineering. He also earned a master's degree in naval architect and marine engineering and a second master's in industrial and operations engineering at the University of Michigan. In 1986, Brown received the Master of Business Administration degree from the Rensselaer Polytechnic Institute. He then received a master's degree in national security and strategic studies when he graduated from the Naval War College in 1994.

== Service years ==
Brown served in ships including the Coast Guard icebreaker Burton Island (WAGB-283), Cutter Jarvis (WHEC-725), and Cutter Rush (WHEC-723). He has held positions on board ships including damage control assistant, assistant engineer officer, and maintenance type deck officer. He has also served in the Small Boat Branch as the supervisor for two inspection officers instructors in the Marine Engineering Department at the U. S. Coast Guard Academy, and served as executive officer. He has been a program reviewer in the Office of the Chief of Staff, Programs Division in Coast Guard Headquarters, and has served as the military assistant to the Secretary of Transportation. He was also assigned as chief of the Budget Division in the Office of the Chief of Staff in Coast Guard Headquarters. In 1998, Brown was promoted to rear admiral. Recently, he was the commanding officer of the USCG Integrated Support Command in Portsmouth, VA. Before he retired, he was the Commander of the Maintenance and Logistics Command Atlantic in Norfolk, Virginia.

He retired after 33 years of service. He currently serves as the program evaluator for the Accreditation Board for Engineering and Technology.

He coauthored with Harry Benford of the University of Michigan a book entitled Ship Replacement and Prediction of Economic Life. He presented this to the 25th Annual Colloquium of Shipbuilders in Hamburg, Germany at the University of Hamburg.

== Awards and decorations ==

1st row	Secretary of Transportation Outstanding Achievement Medal	Legion of Merit	
2nd row	Meritorious Service Medal (with two gold award stars)	Coast Guard Commendation Medal (with two gold award stars)	Secretary of Transportation Outstanding Unit Award
3rd row	Coast Guard Unit Commendation	Meritorious Unit Commendation	Coast Guard Bicentennial Unit Commendation
4th row	National Defense Service Medal (with two bronze service stars)	Antarctica Service Medal	Coast Guard Arctic Service Medal
5th row	Global War on Terrorism Service Medal	Humanitarian Service Medal	Special Operations Service Ribbon (with three bronze service stars)
6th row	Coast Guard Sea Service Ribbon	Coast Guard Expert Rifle Medal	Coast Guard Expert Pistol Medal
