= Winbeck =

Winbeck is a surname. Notable people with the surname include:

- Allen Winbeck (1905–1990), United States Coast Guard rear admiral
- Heinz Winbeck (1946–2019), German composer, conductor, and academic teacher
