= Owen W. Siler =

U.S. Coast Guard admiral (1922–2007)

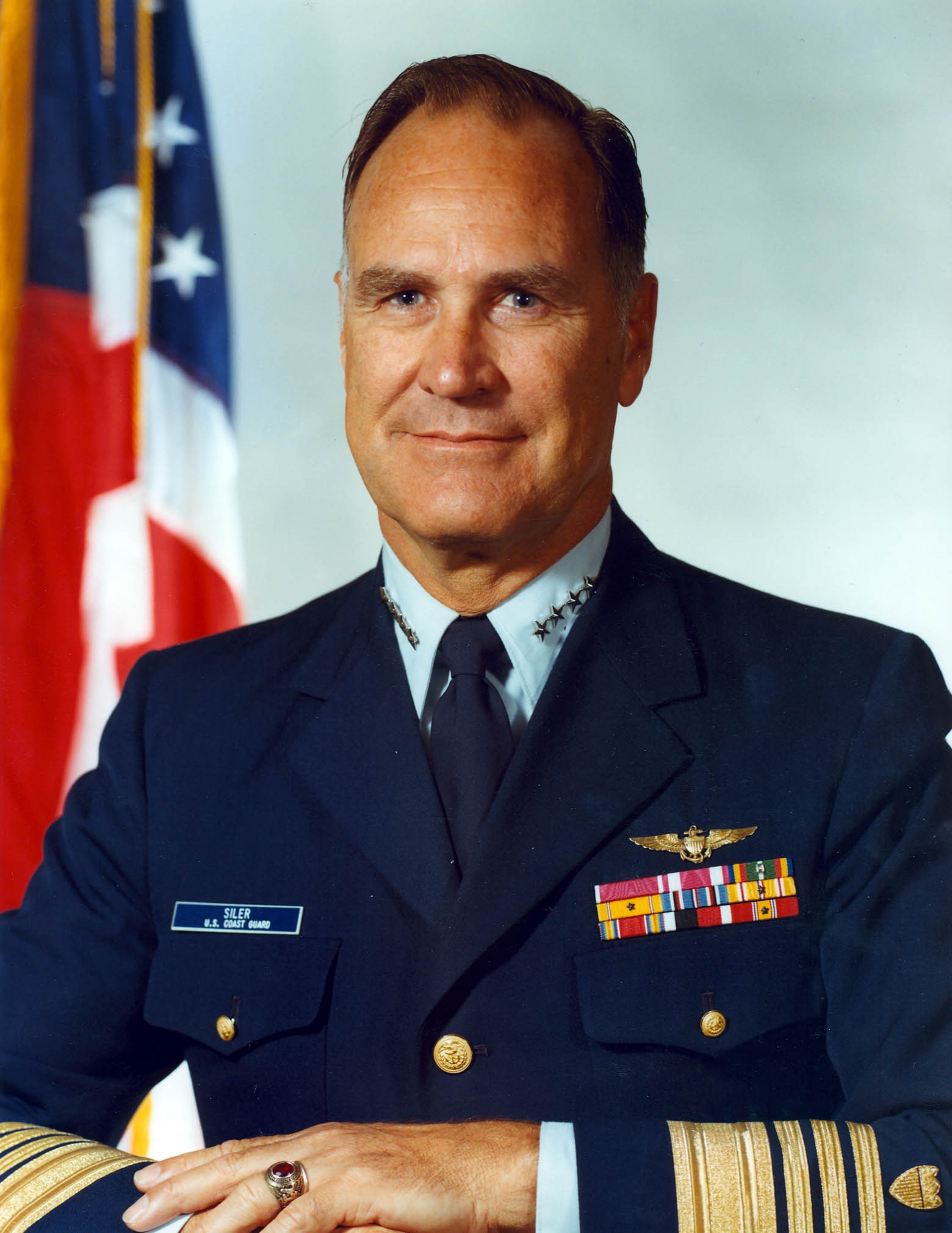
- Born: Owen Wesley Siler; January 10, 1922; Seattle, Washington, U.S.
- Died: July 17, 2007 (aged 85); Atlanta, Georgia, U.S.
- Burial place: Savannah, Georgia, U.S.
- Military career
- Allegiance: United States
- Branch: United States Coast Guard
- Service years: 1943-1978
- Rank: Admiral
- Unit: USCGC Taney
- Commands: Commandant of the Coast Guard
- Conflicts: World War II: Bougainville campaign; Occupation of Japan; Cuban refugee crisis of 1965
- Awards: Legion of Merit; Meritorious Service Medal; Coast Guard Unit Commendation; American Defense Service Medal; American Campaign Medal; Asiatic-Pacific Campaign Medal; World War II Victory Medal; Navy Occupation Service Medal; National Defense Service Medal
- Website: https://www.history.uscg.mil/

Owen Wesley Siler (January 10, 1922 – July 17, 2007) was a United States Coast Guard admiral who served as the 15th commandant from 1974 to 1978.

== Early life and education ==
Siler was born in Seattle, Washington and grew up in Santa Maria, California where he attended Santa Maria High School. He graduated from Santa Maria Junior College (now Allan Hancock College) in 1940, and transferred to the United States Coast Guard Academy in New London, Connecticut, graduating a year early due to World War II. Upon graduation, he was assigned to the assault troop transport ship, USS Hunter Liggett, and participated in the invasion of Bougainville. Siler received a Master of Science degree in international affairs from George Washington University's Elliott School of International Affairs in 1968.

== Career ==
During World War II, Siler quickly advanced through the ranks, serving as a gunnery officer, assistant navigator, and deck watch officer. In the immediate aftermath of the war, he participated in the U.S. occupation of Northern Honshū, Japan.

Upon returning to the United States in April 1946, he briefly served as a personnel officer at the U.S. Coast Guard Training Center in Alameda, California, before his assignment as navigator of USCGC Taney.

His career with the U.S. Coast Guard included serving as a deck officer afloat, as an aviator performing search and rescue patrols, and ashore in the law enforcement, marine safety and environmental protection fields. Other assignments included chief of the search and rescue branch in Juneau, Alaska, deputy chief of staff in Washington, and commanding officer at Air Station Miami, where the station received a Coast Guard unit commendation for Cuban exodus operations during October and November 1965.

From 1971 until his appointment as commandant, he served as commander of the St. Louis-based 2nd Coast Guard District.

During Siler's tenure as commandant he instituted a minority recruiting program and was instrumental in having women admitted to the U.S. Coast Guard Academy, making it the first of the military service academies to do so. He also oversaw the expansion of the U.S. Coast Guard's marine environmental protection program, with the passage of the Fisheries Conservation and Management Act of 1976, which included an increase of the service's jurisdiction along the U.S. coastline to more than two million square miles.

Siler was the last World War II veteran to serve as commandant.

== Dates of rank ==
Ensign	Lieutenant, Junior Grade	Lieutenant	Lieutenant Commander	Commander	Captain
O-1	O-2	O-3	O-4	O-5	O-6
June 9, 1943	April 1, 1944	November 1, 1945	August 26, 1952	July 1, 1959	July 1, 1965

Commodore	Rear Admiral	Vice Admiral	Admiral
O-7	O-8	O-9	O-10
Never held	July 1, 1971	Never held	June 1, 1974

== Awards and decorations ==

Badge	Naval Aviator insignia		
1st row	Coast Guard Distinguished Service Medal	Secretary of Transportation Outstanding Achievement Medal	
2nd row	Legion of Merit	Meritorious Service Medal with "O" device	Coast Guard Unit Commendation with "O" device
3rd row	American Defense Service Medal with one service star	American Campaign Medal	Asiatic-Pacific Campaign Medal with service star
4th row	World War II Victory Medal	Navy Occupation Service Medal	National Defense Service Medal with service star
5th row	Rifle Marksmanship Ribbon with silver sharpshooter device	Expert Pistol Marksmanship Medal	Order of St. Olav, Commander (Norway)

== Later life and death ==
Following his retirement from the U.S. Coast Guard, Siler moved to Savannah, Georgia, where he died from complications of heart failure on July 17, 2007, at the age of 85, and is buried in Arlington National Cemetery.

Military offices
Preceded by Chester R. Bender	Commandant of the U.S. Coast Guard; 1974—1978	Succeeded by John B. Hayes
