= Larry L. Hereth =

Rear Admiral Larry L. Hereth
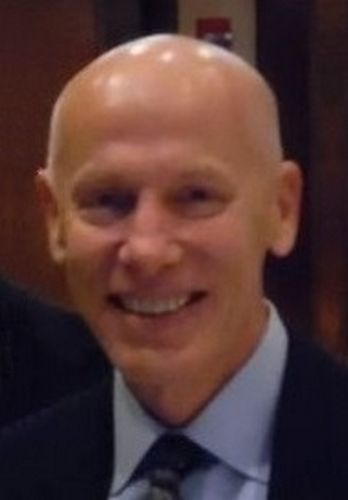
- RADM (Retired) Larry Hereth in 2016
- Allegiance: United States of America
- Branch: United States Coast Guard
- Service years: 1973–2007
- Rank: Rear Admiral
- Commands: Fifth Coast Guard District
- Awards: Department of Transportation Gold Medal; Legion of Merit; and Transportation 9-11 Medal

Rear Admiral Larry L. Hereth is a former admiral who was the Commander of the Fifth Coast Guard District of the United States Coast Guard. He has also acted as director of port security and Assistant Commandant for Marine Safety, Security and Environmental Protection. He retired in 2007, after 34 years of service.

Rear Admiral Hereth is a 1973 graduate of the United States Coast Guard Academy. He also earned an MBA in 1992 from Florida Institute of Technology. In his 32 years of service, he has seen a broad-based career with an emphasis on field operations. His wide-ranging assignments have taken him throughout the United States with multiple tours at east, gulf and west coast ports. The Fifth Coast Guard District was his fourth command assignment. In 2005 he served as the Principal Federal Official for Hurricane Rita Recovery operations reporting directly to DHS Secretary Michael Chertoff.

He has received numerous personal awards throughout his career, including the Department of Transportation Secretary's Gold Medal Award, the Legion of Merit, the 9-11 Medal and the Meritorious Service Medal with the Operational Distinguishing Device.

After retiring from the Coast Guard, Hereth settled in Lawrenceburg, Indiana where he became a certified financial planner. He was elected to the board of directors of the Military Officers Association of America in 2012, serving on the board's print and digital media committee.

== See also ==
- Organization of the United States Coast Guard
