= Sice =

Sice may refer to:

== People ==
- Sice, singer with UK alternative rock band The Boo Radleys
- Gary Sice (born 1984), Gaelic footballer
- James C. Van Sice, Rear Admiral Upper Half of the United States Coast Guard
- Robert van Sice, American percussionist

== Other uses ==
- Sarajevo International Culture Exchange, an international art project
- Southern Idaho College of Education in Albion, Idaho; closed in 1951
