= William Ecker (disambiguation) =

William Ecker was a naval officer.

William Ecker may also refer to:

- William J. Ecker, rear admiral in the United States Coast Guard
- William Ecker (assemblyman) in 50th New York State Legislature
