= John B. Hayes =

Commandant of the United States Coast Guard (1924–2001)

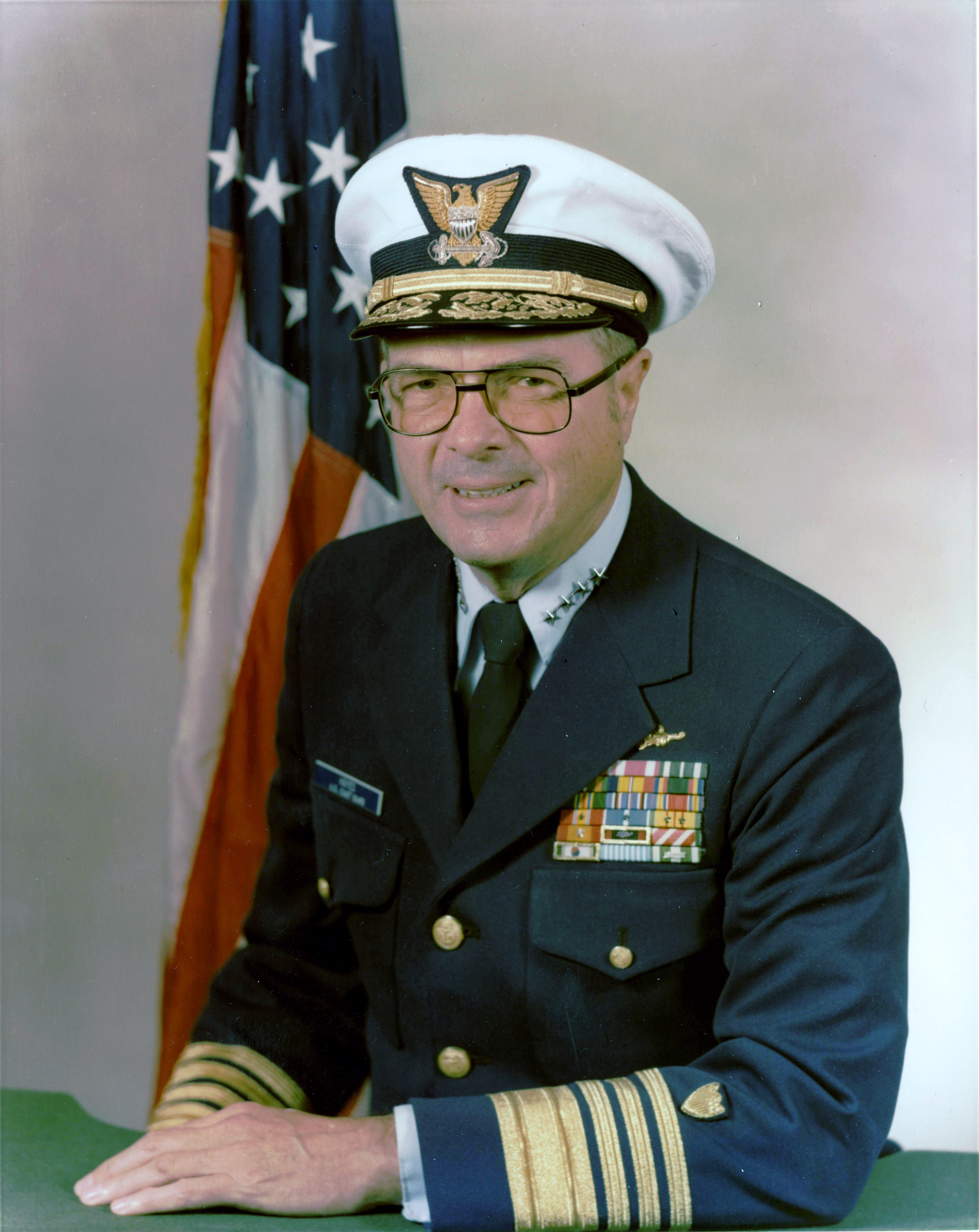
- Born: 30 August 1924; Jamestown, New York, U.S.
- Died: 17 January 2001 (aged 76); Florida Keys, Florida, U.S.
- Burial place: Arlington National Cemetery, Arlington County, Virginia, U.S.
- Military career
- Branch: United States Coast Guard
- Service years: 1946–1982
- Rank: Admiral
- Commands: Commandant of the U.S. Coast Guard; Commander of the 17th Coast Guard District
- Awards: Coast Guard Distinguished Service Medal; Legion of Merit; Defense Meritorious Service Medal; Joint Service Commendation Medal; Coast Guard Commendation Medal

John Briggs Hayes (30 August 1924 – 17 January 2001) was an admiral of the United States Coast Guard who served as the 16th commandant from 1978 to 1982.

== Early life and education ==
Hayes was born in Jamestown, New York, and grew up in Bradford, Pennsylvania. He graduated from the United States Coast Guard Academy in New London, Connecticut in 1946, although Academy records list him in the Class of 1947. His first command assignment was at the LORAN Transmitting Station in Matsumae, Hokkaidō, Japan. After a series of Coast Guard cutter command assignments, he attended the Naval War College in Newport, Rhode Island. Following graduation from the Naval War College, he was stationed in Washington, D.C., where he graduated from George Washington University's Elliott School of International Affairs, earning an M.A. in international affairs.

== Career ==
From 1966 to 1968, Hayes assumed a command post, stationed in Vietnam, during the war. Returning to Washington, he was promoted to captain and assigned to the U.S. Coast Guard's Office of Boating Safety, followed by his service as Commandant of cadets at the United States Coast Guard Academy. From 1975, until his appointment as Coast Guard Commandant, he served as commander of the Juneau, Alaska-based 17th Coast Guard District.

Under Hayes' leadership, the Coast Guard accomplished a number of firsts for women in the military, including the assignment of Lieutenant (junior grade) Beverly Kelley, as the first female commanding officer of a U.S. military vessel, and Lieutenant Kay Hartzell, as the first female to command an isolated U.S. military unit.

== Dates of rank ==
Ensign	Lieutenant, Junior Grade	Lieutenant	Lieutenant Commander	Commander	Captain
O-1	O-2	O-3	O-4	O-5	O-6
5 June 1946	15 September 1948	29 October 1951	1 July 1958	1 July 1964	1 October 1968

Commodore	Rear Admiral	Vice Admiral	Admiral
O-7	O-8	O-9	O-10
Never held	1 August 1973	Never held	1 June 1978

== Later life and death ==
Following his retirement from the Coast Guard, Hayes moved to Boothbay, Maine. He died while vacationing in the Florida Keys after being struck by a car at the age of 76. He is buried in Arlington National Cemetery.

== Personal life ==
Hayes was an Eagle Scout and a recipient of the Distinguished Eagle Scout Award.

Military offices
Preceded by Owen W. Siler	Commandant of the Coast Guard; 1978-1982	Succeeded by James S. Gracey
