= Reserve Forces Policy Board =

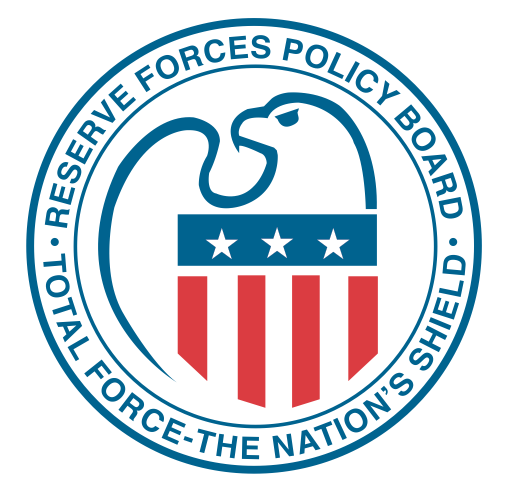
Seal of the Reserve Forces Policy Board

The Reserve Forces Policy Board (RFPB) is a federal advisory committee established by statute within the Office of the Secretary of Defense. Its purpose is to "serve as an independent adviser to the Secretary of Defense to provide advice and recommendations to the Secretary on strategies, policies, and practices designed to improve and enhance the capabilities, efficiency, and effectiveness of the reserve components". By law, the secretary of defense transmits annually to the president and Congress a separate annual report from the RFPB on reserve component matters the board considers appropriate to include in the report.

== Membership and staff ==
The board consists of 20 members; a civilian chairman, a current or former member of each of the seven reserve components, a two-star military executive, a senior enlisted advisor, plus ten other U.S. citizens, who may or may not be government employees, with significant knowledge of and experience in policy matters relevant to national security and reserve component matters.

The board is supported by a staff consisting of a colonel or Navy captain from each of the six DoD reserve components. These officers also serve as liaisons between their respective components and the board. The law requires them “to perform their staff and liaison duties under the supervision of the military executive officer of the board in an independent manner reflecting the independent nature of the board".

The board is organized into four subcommittees:

- Sustainment, Readiness, and Availability of the Operational Reserve
- Continuum of Service and Personnel Policies
- Homeland Operations
- Support for Service Members, Families, and Employers Subcommittees meet as required. The full board meets quarterly.

=== Board Chairs ===
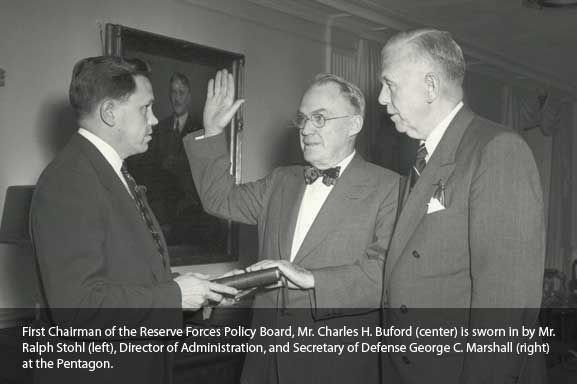
First Chairman of the Reserve Forces Policy Board with Defense Secretary George C. Marshall in 1952

| Name | Tenure |
|---|---|
| Charles H. Buford | 1952–53 |
| Arthur S. Adams | 1953–55 |
| Milton S. Baker | 1955–57 |
| John Slezak | 1957–77 |
| Louis J. Conti | 1977–85 |
| William Hill Tankersly | 1985–89 |
| John O. Marsh, Jr. | 1989–94 |
| Terrence M. O'Connell | 1994–2001 |
| Albert C. Zapanta | 2002–04 |
| William A. Navas, Jr. | 2005–06 |
| G. Kim Wincup | 2006–09 |
| William S. Greenberg | 2009–11 |
| Arnold L. Punaro | 2011–23 |
| Lisa S. Disbrow | 2023-25 |

=== Notable members ===
- Marcia Anderson
- Dennis C. Blair (1996–)
- Dirk J. Debbink (2006–08)
- Sharon K.G. Dunbar (2010–11)
- Michael E. Dunlavey (1997–)
- Martin H. Foery (1968–71)
- John W. Handy
- Grier Martin
- Willard W. Millikan
- John Nagl
- Martha Rainville
- Gene Taylor (2011–present)
- Jeffrey W. Talley (2009–12)
- James C. Van Sice

== History ==
The board is one of the oldest advisory committees in the Department of Defense. In September 1949, in response to inadequate recruitment and strength in the reserve program of the armed services, Secretary of Defense Louis A. Johnson established a Civilian Components Policy Board. Under the leadership of William T. Faricy, president of the Association of American Railroads, the board ranked directly under the secretary, was on a level with the Joint Chiefs of Staff, and was empowered to give instructions to the reserves of all of the services.

On June 13, 1951, Secretary of Defense George Marshall re-designated the Civilian Components Policy Board as the Reserve Forces Policy Board. In July 1952, the U.S. Congress passed the Armed Forces Act of 1952. This act established the Reserve Forces Policy Board as "the principal policy advisor to the Secretary of Defense on matters relating to the Reserve components". Passage of the Reserve Officer Personnel Act of 1954 and the Reserve Bill of Rights and Revitalization Act of 1967 underscored the board's role and expanded its authority, responsibility, and membership. In 1995, a member of the staff of the Joint Chiefs of Staff was added to the board's membership.

=== 2011 restructuring ===
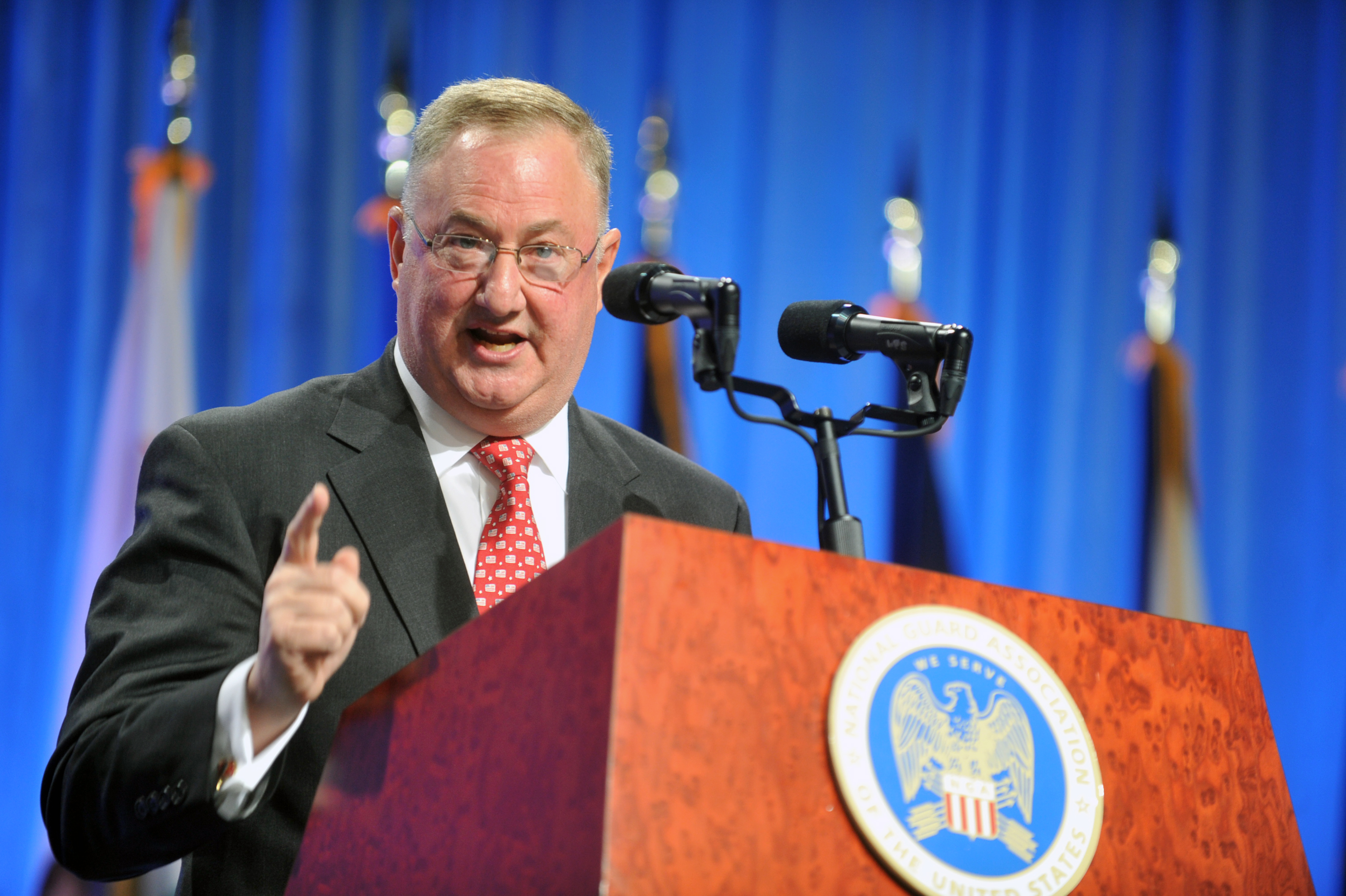
Retired Marine Maj. Gen. Arnold Punaro, chair of the RFPB, addresses the 134th National Guard Association of the United States General Conference in 2012

In 2008, the Commission on the National Guard and Reserves recommended that the RFPB's governing statute (10 USC 10301) be amended because the board was not structured to obtain and provide directly to the secretary of defense a wide range of independent advice on National Guard and Reserve matters due to the nature of its membership and its subordination to other offices within DoD. Other than the chairman, the board included only DoD officials and made recommendations through the assistant secretary of defense for Reserve affairs.

In the National Defense Authorization Act of 2011, Congress significantly revised the operating framework and membership of the RFPB. The revised law took effect on July 1, 2011.

On September 12, 2011, retired Marine Corps Major General Arnold Punaro was sworn in as the first chairman of the board under the revised structure. Other new members were sworn in at an organizational meeting on October 13.

In October 2011, Chairman Arnold L. Punaro stated that, under its new authority, the board will be much more independent, and objective, and will bring the talent of outside experts to provide timely advice and recommendations directly to the secretary of defense.

=== 2012 rebalancing of forces ===
In 2013 the board released a report that faulted the USAF's effort to reduce its reserve components on a cost basis, by pointing to the "unsustainable" costs of active duty forces as compared to reserve units.

== Subordinate Boards ==
Chapter 1009 of RFPB's governing statute (Title 10 or 10 USC) also calls for the establishment of four subordinate reserve policy boards/committees:

- Army Reserve Forces Policy Committee (10 USC 10302)
- Navy Reserve Policy Board (10 USC 10303)
- Marine Corps Reserve Policy Board (10 USC 10304)
- Air Force Reserve Forces Policy Committee (10 USC 10305)
