= Black cadets at the United States Coast Guard Academy =

United States Coast Guard Academy
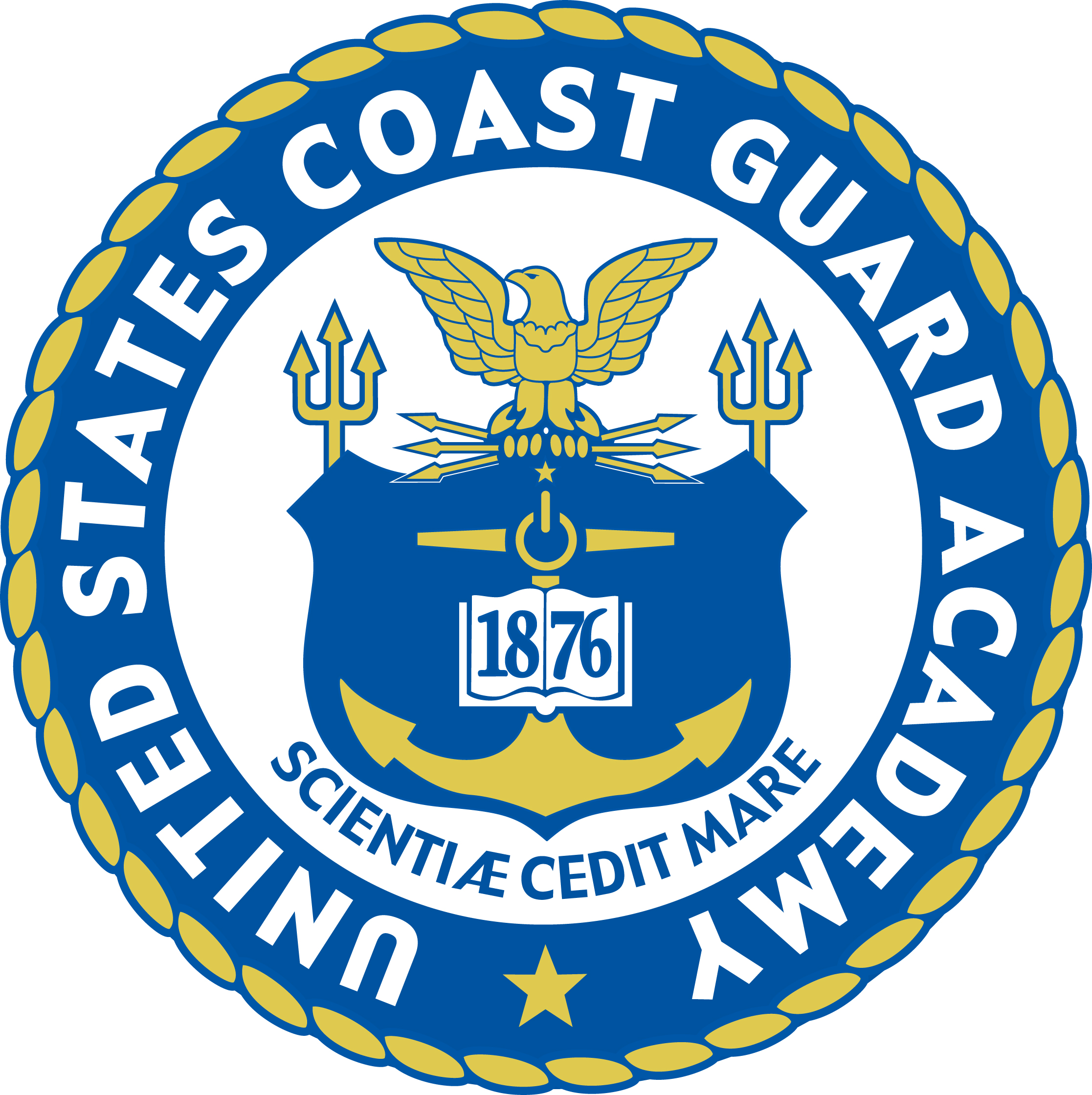
- Former name: Revenue Cutter Service School of Instruction (1876)
- Motto: Scientiæ Cedit Mare (Latin)
- Motto in English: The sea yields to knowledge
- Type: U.S. Service Academy
- Established: 1876
- Superintendent: Rear Admiral William G. Kelley (USCGA 1987)
- Dean: Capt. (ret.) Kurt J. Colella
- Commandant: Capt. Rick Wester (USCGA 1993)
- Faculty: 130
- Students: 1045 cadets (as of September 2019)
- Location: New London, Connecticut, U.S. 41°22′22″N 72°06′06″W
- Campus: Suburban - 110 acres (44.5 ha)
- Fight song: "Semper Paratus"
- Colors: Blue & orange
- Nickname: Bears
- Sporting affiliations: NCAA Division III - NEWMAC NEFC
- Mascot: Objee the Bear
- Website: www.uscga.edu

Founded in 1876 as the U.S. Revenue Cutter Service School of Instruction, the United States Coast Guard Academy graduated their first African-American Cadet, Merle Smith, in 1966. Prior to 1962, there was one African-American Cadet, Javis Wright, admitted.

== First African-American appointment ==
President John F. Kennedy’s new frontier was to push the envelope in areas of national life that had not been reached during the terms of President Harry S. Truman or President Dwight D. Eisenhower. A Presidential Executive Order 9981 issued by Truman had desegregated the armed forces on July 26, 1948, but the service academies were lagging in officer recruiting. As a precursor to President Lyndon B. Johnson's Great Society programs (Head Start, Civil Rights Act, Voting Rights Act, Medicare, and the appointment of Thurgood Marshall as the first Black Supreme Court Justice) President Kennedy challenged the U. S. Coast Guard Academy to tender appointments to black high school students soon after his inauguration.

== First African-American cadets ==
The Coast Guard Academy admitted Javis Leon Wright, Jr. into the Corps of Cadets in 1955. For two years, Wright competed with the academy's track and cross-country teams and was well liked by his fellow cadets. In 1957 he developed serious health problems and had to resign his appointment. Academy superintendent, Rear Admiral Frank Leamy had to accept the resignation, stating, “I regret that Cadet Wright must be separated from the Coast Guard. He has demonstrated the qualities of character, intelligence and interest that are desired in prospective Commissioned Officers of the Coast Guard."

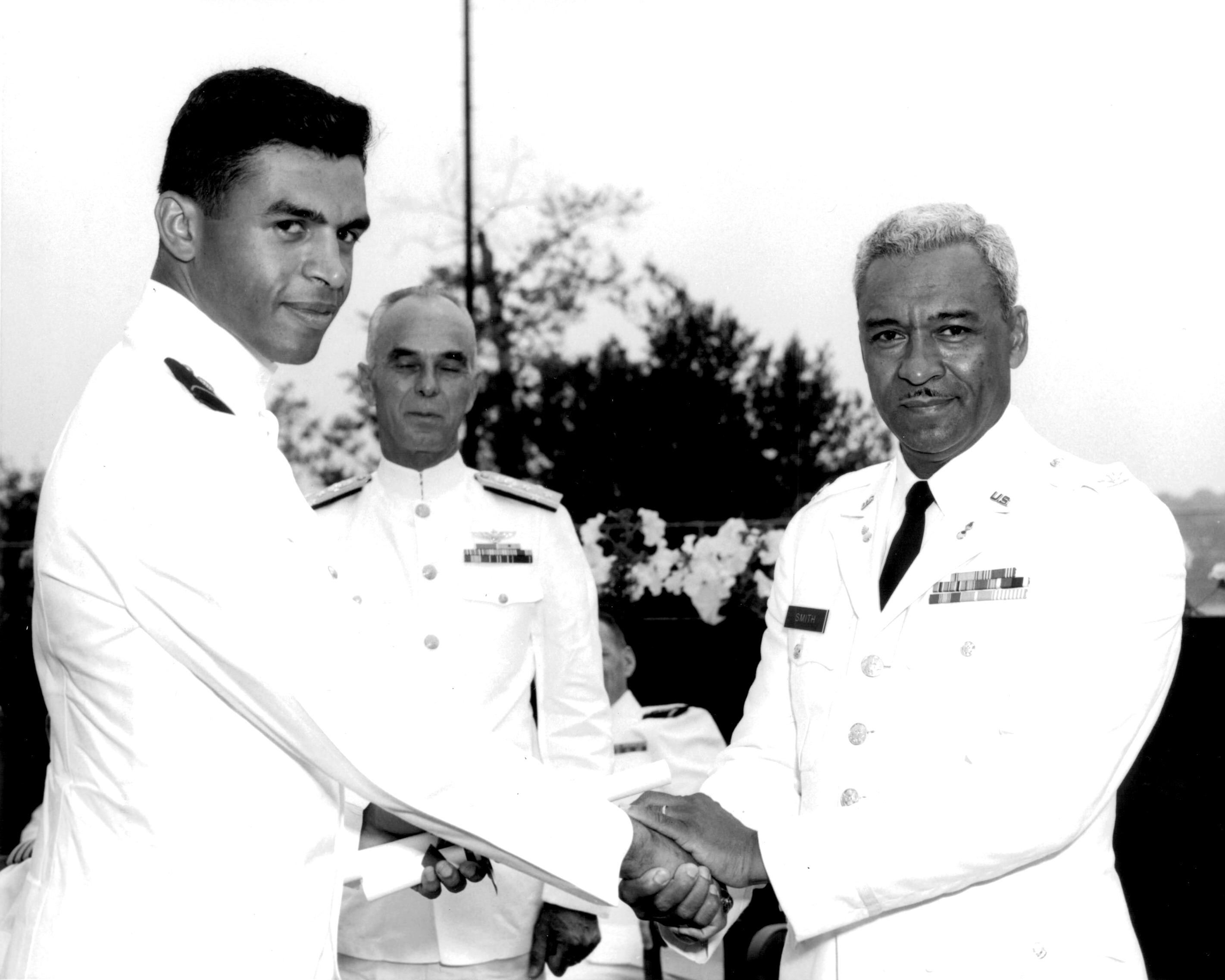
Ensign Merle J. Smith Jr. (left) is congratulated by his father, Colonel Merle J. Smith Sr., AUS (right) upon his graduation from the Coast Guard Academy in 1966. Admiral Willard J. Smith, Commandant, is in background. Ensign Smith was the first African-American graduate of the U.S. Coast Guard Academy.

In June 1962, Merle James Smith, Jr. was admitted to the Coast Guard Academy. In June 1966 he became the first African American to graduate.

== Coast Guard Integration ==
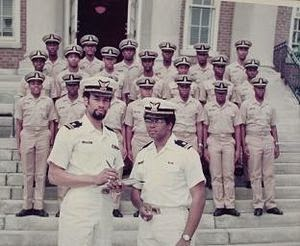
LT Steverson '68 and LT(jg) Robert Thornton '72 with USCGA Class of 1978 minority cadets, 1974

As the Chief of the Minority Recruiting Section Lieutenant London Steverson desegregated the all-white United States Coast Guard Academy by recruiting more than 50 minority cadets in a two-year period from 1973 to 1974.

== Historical Accomplishments ==
There have been many historic firsts accomplished by African-American Coast Guard Academy graduates.

- 1966 - Merle James Smith became the first African-American to graduate from the academy.
- 1988 - Commander Merle Smith USCGA '66 and Lieutenant Commander London Steverson USCGA '68 became the first African-American Coast Guard Academy graduates to retire from the Coast Guard. Smith was the first African American graduate of the Coast Guard Academy while Steverson was the second African-American graduate of the academy.
- 2000 - Jacqueline P. James was the first black female engineering graduate from the United States Coast Guard Academy with a Bachelor of Science in Civil Engineering.
- 2001 - Ensign Andrea Parker became the first African-American woman to graduate with an engineering degree from the Coast Guard Academy.
- 2005 - Lieutenant (Junior Grade) Jeanine McIntosh, was awarded her wings at a ceremony at Naval Air Station Corpus Christi, after completing her flight training there. She is the first black female Coast Guard aviator.

== Programs targeting African-American prospective students ==
=== Eclipse Diversity Weekend ===
High school sophomores, juniors, and seniors with appointment offers for almost half a century joined Academy graduates and cadets for this annual celebration of diversity. This two-day event brought African-American alumni home to renew friendships and professional ties, and to mentor current and future cadets. Eclipse kicked off Friday afternoon with a cadet parade and ended Saturday afternoon with a talent show. Guests were paired with cadet escorts and stayed overnight in the cadet barracks. The Trump administration ended this tradition with its wholesale cancelation of all "DEI" events in early 2025.

== Notes ==
Citations

References used

- "Academy at a Glance". United States Coast Guard Academy. U.S. Coast Guard. Archived from the original on 5 September 2015.
- "A Historical Chronology". African-Americans in Coast Guard History. U.S. Coast Guard Historian's Office.
- "A Historic Photo Gallery". African-Americans in the U.S. Coast Guard. U.S. Coast Guard Historian's Office.
- "Eagle, 1946". Cutters, Craft & U.S. Coast Guard Manned Army & Navy Vessels. U.S. Coast Guard Historian's Office.
- "Eclipse Week 2015". Cadet Life. U.S. Coast Guard Academy.
- "Genesis Council". Campus Life. U.S. Coast Guard Academy. Archived from the original on 12 September 2015.
- "Vice Admiral Manson Brown of the U.S. Coast Guard". Diversity/Careers in Engineering and Information Technology. Diversity/Careers. Archived from the original on 2 August 2014.
- "Women In UM History Project" (PDF). University Of Miami Women's Commission. University of Miami (Florida). Archived from the original (PDF) on 4 March 2016.
- Thiesen, William H. "Pioneers of Ethnic Diversity in the American Sea Services" (PDF). The Bulletin; The Foundation for Coast Guard History. U.S. Coast Guard Historian's Office.
