= Arnold L. Punaro =

United States Marine Corps general

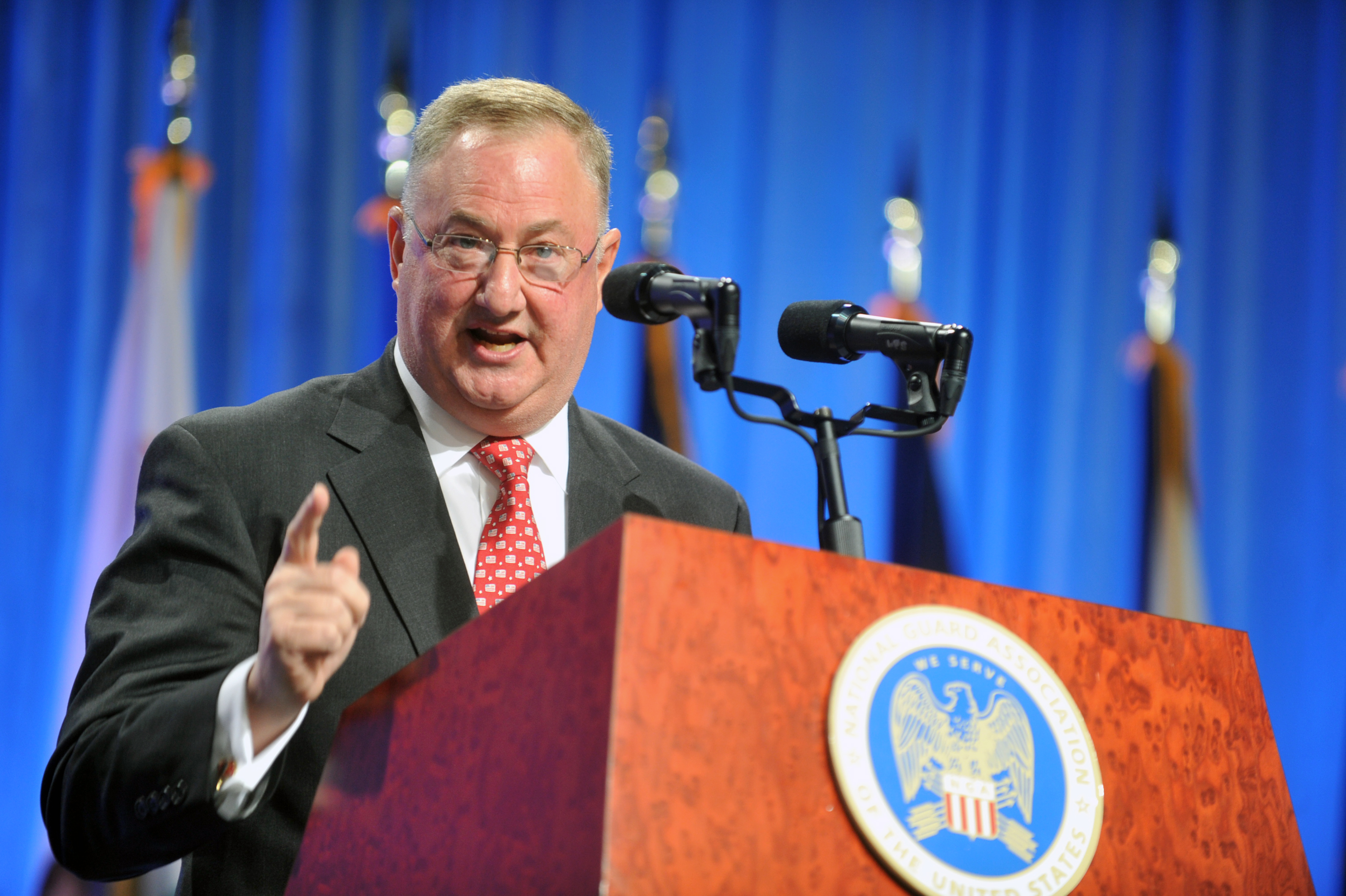
- Punaro addressing the National Guard Association of the United States General Conference, September 11, 2012
- Born: August 10, 1946 (age 80); Augusta, Georgia, U.S.
- Military career
- Allegiance: United States of America
- Branch: United States Marine Corps
- Service years: 1968–2003
- Rank: Major General
- Wars: Vietnam War
- Awards: Bronze Star; Purple Heart

Arnold L. Punaro (born August 10, 1946) is a retired United States Marine Corps Major General and CEO of The Punaro Group. He was formerly Chairman of the Secretary of Defense's Reserve Forces Policy Board for 12 years, two-time Chairman of the National Defense Industrial Association, and a founding member of the Defense Business Board. He was an executive vice president at Science Applications International Corporation (SAIC) in McLean, Virginia from 1997 to 2010. Punaro held several positions with the United States Senate (from 1973 to 1997) including Staff Director of the Senate Armed Services Committee. He is recognized by Defense News as one of the 100 Most Influential Individuals in U.S. Defense.

== Early life and education ==
Punaro was born in Augusta, Georgia on August 10, 1946. He is the son of Maria Annina (née Benedetto) and Angelo Joseph Punaro, a decorated Army veteran for his service during World War II. His father and mother were 2nd generation Americans whose parents immigrated from Italy.

Punaro was raised in Macon, Georgia. He attended St. Joseph's Grammar School from first grade through eighth grade. He graduated from Mount De Sales Catholic High School in 1964.

Punaro attended Spring Hill College in Mobile, Alabama where he obtained his undergraduate degree in English in 1968. He earned his Master of Arts degree in journalism from the University of Georgia in 1976 and Master of Arts degree in National Security Studies from Georgetown University in 1979. Punaro later served as an adjunct professor at the Walsh School of Foreign Service at Georgetown University for ten years (from 1990 to 2000) where he taught an annual graduate-level course entitled "National Security Decision Making.” He is currently a Senior Visiting Scholar at the University of Georgia, teaching a course in the School of Public and International Affairs.

In 2011 Punaro was inducted as a Grady College Fellow of the Grady College of Journalism and Mass Communication at the University of Georgia. He currently serves as chairman on the SPIA Board of Visitors for the University of Georgia and serves on the Nunn School Advisory Board at Georgia Tech. He formerly served on Syracuse University's Maxwell School Advisory Board.

== Military career ==
After graduating from Spring Hill College in 1968, Punaro volunteered for military service in the United States Marine Corps during the peak of the Vietnam War. In January 1969, he was commissioned a second lieutenant. He served on active duty as an infantry platoon commander in Vietnam from August 1969 to January 1970 where he was awarded the Bronze Star for Valor and the Purple Heart. Upon returning from Vietnam, he served on the staff at The Marine Corps Basic School (TBS) in Quantico, Virginia. Punaro completed his active duty obligation in 1972 and subsequently joined the Marine Corps Reserve where he served until October 1, 2003.

In December 1990, he was mobilized for Operation Desert Shield. In December 1993, he completed a tour of active duty as Commander of Joint Task Force Provide Promise (Forward) in the former Yugoslavia. He was then promoted to the rank of Brigadier General, and his first assignment was Deputy Commander of the U.S. Marine Reserve Forces, today known as the U.S. Marine Corps Forces Reserve (MARFORRES or MFR). His next assignment was Commanding General of the Marine Corps Mobilization Command (MCRSC) from 1995 to 1997. In this position, he designed what would later become the Marine for Life Program, a program that connects transitioning Marines and their family members to education resources, employment opportunities, and other veteran services.

From August 1997 until August 2000, Punaro served as Commanding General of the 4th Marine Division. Under his command, the 4th Division achieved the highest level of combat readiness – a significant accomplishment for a reserve division. Following the division command, he served as the Deputy Commanding General (Mobilization) of the Marine Corps Combat Development Command (in 2000). In 2001, Punaro assumed a 2-star active-duty billet at Headquarters Marine Corps as director of Reserve Affairs. In this capacity, post 9–11, he was involved in the largest mobilization of the Marine Corps Reserve in its history. Punaro was mobilized in May 2003 in support of Operation Enduring Freedom and Operation Iraqi Freedom. Punaro retired as a Major General in October 2003 after 35 years of military service. He sits on the board of directors for the Marine Corps Heritage Foundation.

== Senate career ==
From 1973 to 1997, Punaro worked for Senator Sam Nunn (D-GA) on national security matters. He served as his director of National Security Affairs and then as Staff Director of the Senate Armed Services Committee (1987–95) and Staff Director for the Minority (1983–87, 1995–97). In his work with Senator Nunn and the Senate Armed Services Committee, he was involved in the formulation of all major defense and intelligence legislation including the beginnings of the All- Volunteer Force, the Goldwater-Nichols Defense Reorganization, the Packard Commission Acquisition Reforms, the creation of the Special Operations Command, the draw-down after the Cold War, the first Gulf War, and expanding billets for women. He was directly involved with the confirmation process for secretaries of defense, chairmen of the Joint Chiefs of Staff and service chiefs, hundreds of civilian nominations, and tens of thousands of military nominations. Punaro was consistently named by Roll Call as One of the Top 50 Staffers in the Congress.

== Business ==
Punaro served as a Senior Vice President and then Executive Vice President at Science Applications International Corporation (SAIC) from 1997 to May 2010, at that time a 10 billion dollar defense and aerospace company. He served as a Sector Manager, Deputy President of the Federal Business Segment and led SAIC's Corporate Business Development Organization. He was the Senior Corporate Official responsible for SAIC's government affairs, worldwide communications and support operations, as well as General Manager of their Washington Operations and Supervisor of SAIC's Corporate Small and Disadvantaged Business Office. Punaro was part of the team that took SAIC public in October 2006. Punaro was recognized for his leadership and accomplishments at SAIC with the Founder's Award and two special CEO awards. He also served an eight-year tenure as a member of the board of directors for Sourcefire, a cyber-security company that he helped take public. Sourcefire was sold to Cisco Systems for 2.7 billion dollars in 2013.

Punaro retired from SAIC in 2010 to start his own consulting business, The Punaro Group (TPG), a Washington-based firm that specializes in federal budget and market analysis, business strategy and capture, acquisition due diligence, government relations, communications, sensitive operations, business risk analysis and compliance, and crisis management. In 2013 Punaro and his oldest son formed IronArch Technology, a firm providing next generation IT and business transformation solutions as well as consulting and advisory services. The Washington Business Journal named IronArch “One of the Best Places to Work” in 2016. In 2014 Punaro was named to Wash100, the premier group of leaders who create value and execute strategic vision at the intersection of the public and private sector.

== Media ==
Punaro has appeared frequently as a defense policy expert on radio and television programs, including Hardball, Bloomberg's Balance of Power, CNN, C-SPAN, NPR, Major Network News, Fox Business, and Federal News Radio. His commentary has also appeared in leading print outlets, such as The Wall Street Journal, where his opinion piece titled "America Repeated Vietnam's Mistakes in Afghanistan" appeared in 2021. He is quoted in print media and is the subject of articles discussing defense.

Punaro is the author of the three books: On War and Politics: The Battlefield Inside Washington's Beltway, that was published by the Naval Institute Press in October 2016; The Ever-Shrinking Fighting Force (2021); and IF CONFIRMED: An Insider's View of the National Security Confirmation Process (2024).
