= Arthur E. Henn =

U.S. Coast Guard admiral (1940–2001)

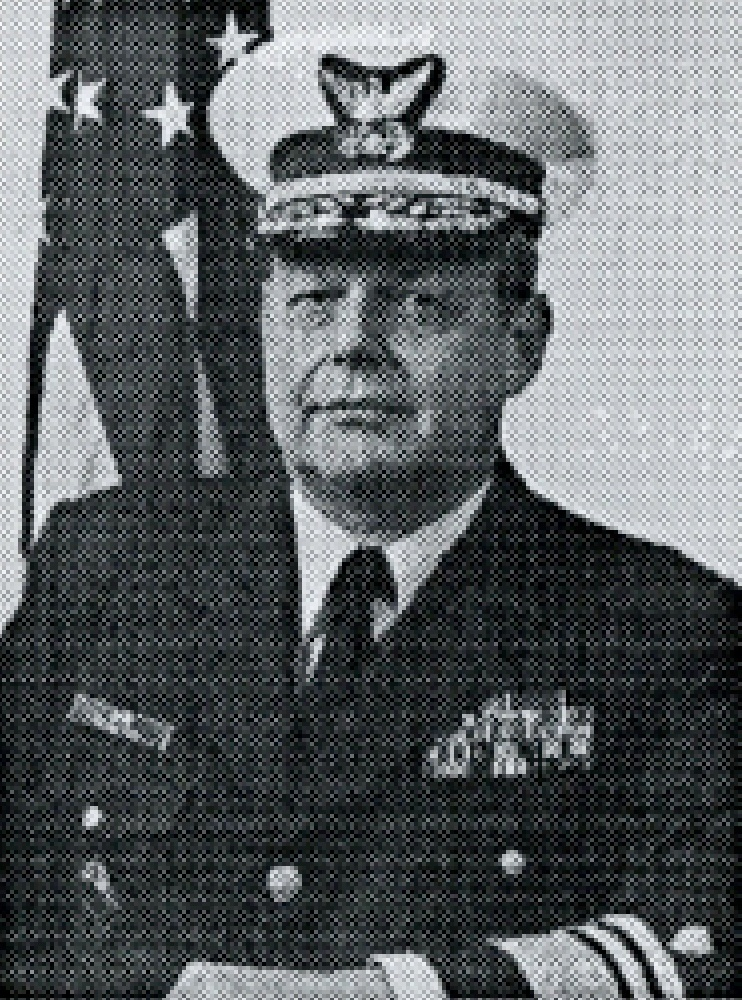
- Born: June 5, 1940; Cincinnati, Ohio, U.S.
- Died: March 28, 2001 (aged 60); Tampa, Florida, U.S.
- Burial place: Arlington National Cemetery
- Education: University of Michigan
- Military career
- Allegiance: United States
- Branch: United States Coast Guard
- Service years: c. 1962–1996
- Rank: Vice admiral
- Commands: Vice Commandant of the United States Coast Guard

Arthur Eugene (Gene) Henn (June 5, 1940 – March 28, 2001) was a vice admiral in the United States Coast Guard who served as the 19th Vice Commandant from 1994 to 1996. He was previously Chief, Office of Marine Safety, Security and Environmental Protection. He graduated from the United States Coast Guard Academy in 1962 and also attended the University of Michigan (combined master of science degrees in naval architecture, marine engineering and metallurgical engineering) and United States Army War College.

Henn was married to Susan Frances Pedretti of Cincinnati, Ohio and had two children. His awards include the Distinguished Service Medal, Legion of Merit, two Meritorious Service Medals, four Coast Guard Commendation Medals, the Coast Guard Achievement Medal, Coast Guard Unit Commendations, the Coast Guard Meritorious Unit Commendation, and two Coast Guard Commandant's Letter of Commendation Ribbons. Henn died in 2001 at the age of 60 and is buried at Arlington National Cemetery.

Military offices
Preceded by Robert T. Nelson	Vice Commandant of the United States Coast Guard; 1992–1994	Succeeded by Richard D. Herr
