= Swab Summer =

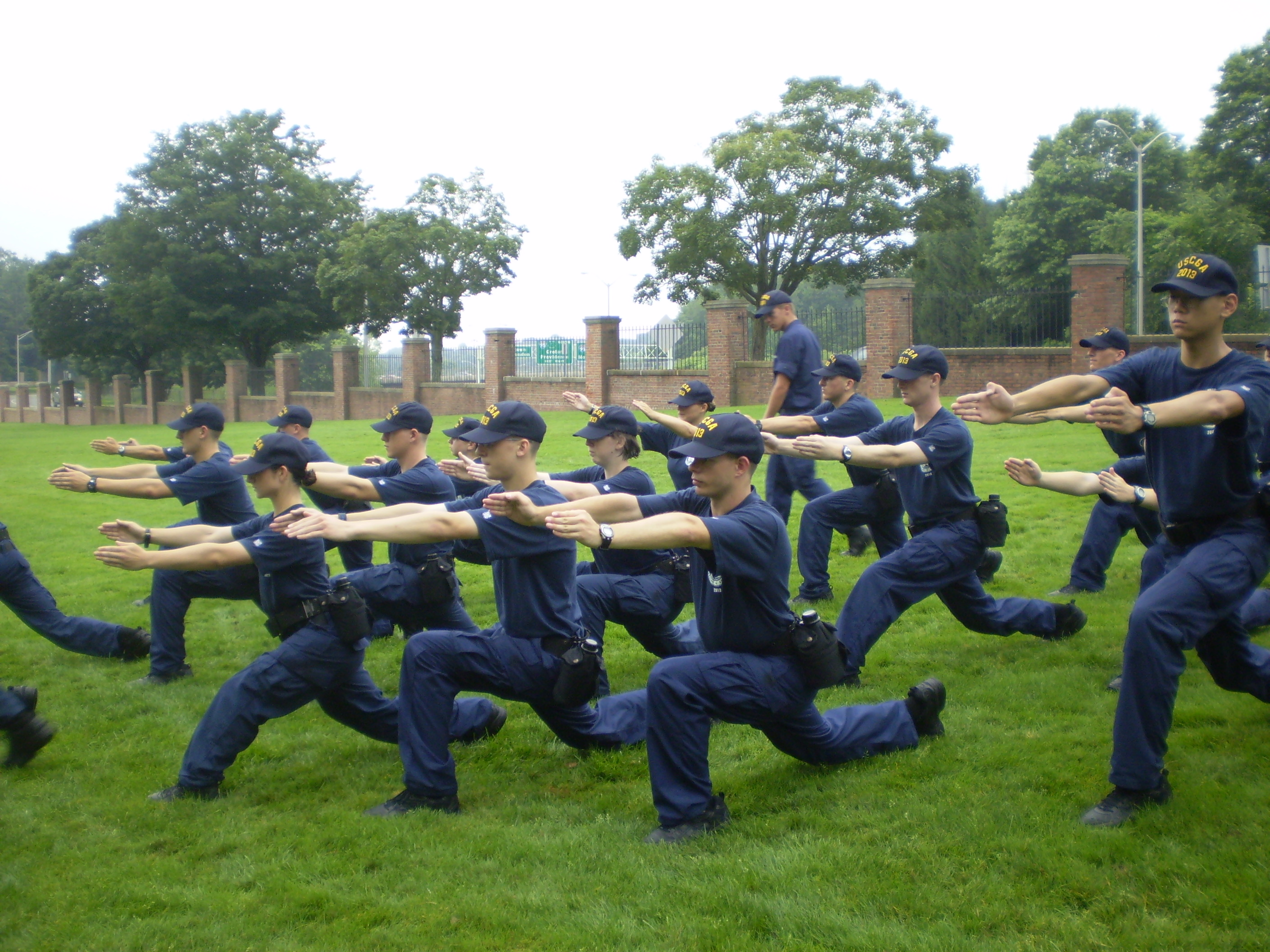
Swab Summer IT Intensive training

The United States Coast Guard Academy's Swab Summer is a seven-week initiation through which all cadets are required to pass. It is the academy's boot camp. Swab Summer is a unique nickname for the program at the Coast Guard comparable to Cadet Basic Training (Beast Barracks) at the United States Military Academy and Plebe Summer at the United States Naval Academy.

The program is intended to emphasize the principles of fellowship, teamwork, seamanship, and military life and introduce cadets to the Coast Guard core values of honor, respect, and devotion to duty. During the summer, Swabs are both physically and mentally tested. They will run obstacle courses, complete team ropes course challenges, learn basic sailing at the Jacobs Rock Seamanship and Sailing center, and do daily calisthenics, while also learning Coast Guard History, their chain of command, and other information (collectively known as "indoc"). Over the course of the summer, the Swabs are tested repeatedly on indoc through written and oral tests to prepare them for the Boards Indoctrination Exam the following spring, the final test of all the indoc learned over the whole year.

Swab Summer is run by the 'cadre', rising 2nd Class (2/c) cadets (cadets entering their Junior year) who experienced themselves Swab Summer two years prior. These cadre are personally trained by Coast Guard Cape May Company Commanders during the Mid-Grade Cadet Transition Program ("100th Week") before training the incoming Swabs. A select group of rising 1st Class (1/c) cadets, known as Battalion Staff, are the cadre's supervisors and the organizers of the logistics necessary for the summer training period.

The Summer Battalion of cadets is divided into 4 companies with 2 platoons in each company (Alfa and Bravo in First Company, Charlie and Delta in Second Company, Echo and Foxtrot in Third Company, Golf and Hotel in Fourth Company). Each company is commanded by a 1/c Company Commander. Each platoon is commanded by a 2/c Platoon Commander with a 2/c Platoon Executive Officer as well as around 8 2/c cadre and 30 Swabs. Halfway through the summer, the 2/c cadre switch out to continue their summer training in other programs, and other 2/c take their place. The Swabs remain with their fellow platoon members throughout the summer and the following school year, after which they are “shotgunned” into different companies.

A day during Swab Summer starts at 0530 with Reveille and morning calisthenics Mon-Sat and 0600 on Sundays with Reveille. The Swabs then clean up their "wing area" (the section of the barracks where the platoon sleeps) and go to breakfast. The rest of the day is filled with trainings, including math review sessions, drill practice, ethics/honor seminars, presentations from officers and senior enlisted members, and various athletic activities such as Inter-Company sports and platoon workouts. Everything the Swabs do is scheduled out in blocks, including 'cadre time', during which the 2/c cadre have the swabs clean, work out, practice drill, or study indoc. The day ends with 'hygiene hour', when the Swabs are given time to clean up and prepare for the next day, which ends at 2200 with Taps and lights out. Swabs are required to continuously “sound off” throughout the course of each day, square corners, and square meals, among other things.

During their seven-week program, each platoon of incoming Swabs spends a week sailing aboard the academy's training ship USCGC Eagle, the only tall ship in America's active forces.

Swab Summer ends with Sea Trials, the 12-13 hour long final test of the Swabs' abilities, teamwork, and perseverance. Intended to simulate the process of surviving a shipwreck, Sea Trials begins around 0330 in the morning when the Swabs are awoken to red emergency lighting, alarms, and shouting. The Swabs pack their sea bags full of various possessions per the cadre's instructions, then run to the football field for an hour-long session of intense calisthenics. The Swabs then spend the rest of the day completing different tasks on and off the academy campus such as a run, a road march, paddling rafts down the Thames River, carrying a log around the campus, and a platoon drill competition. After the conclusion of Sea Trials, the Swabs receive their cadet shoulder boards from their cadre and join the Corps of Cadets for the school year.
