= James C. Van Sice =

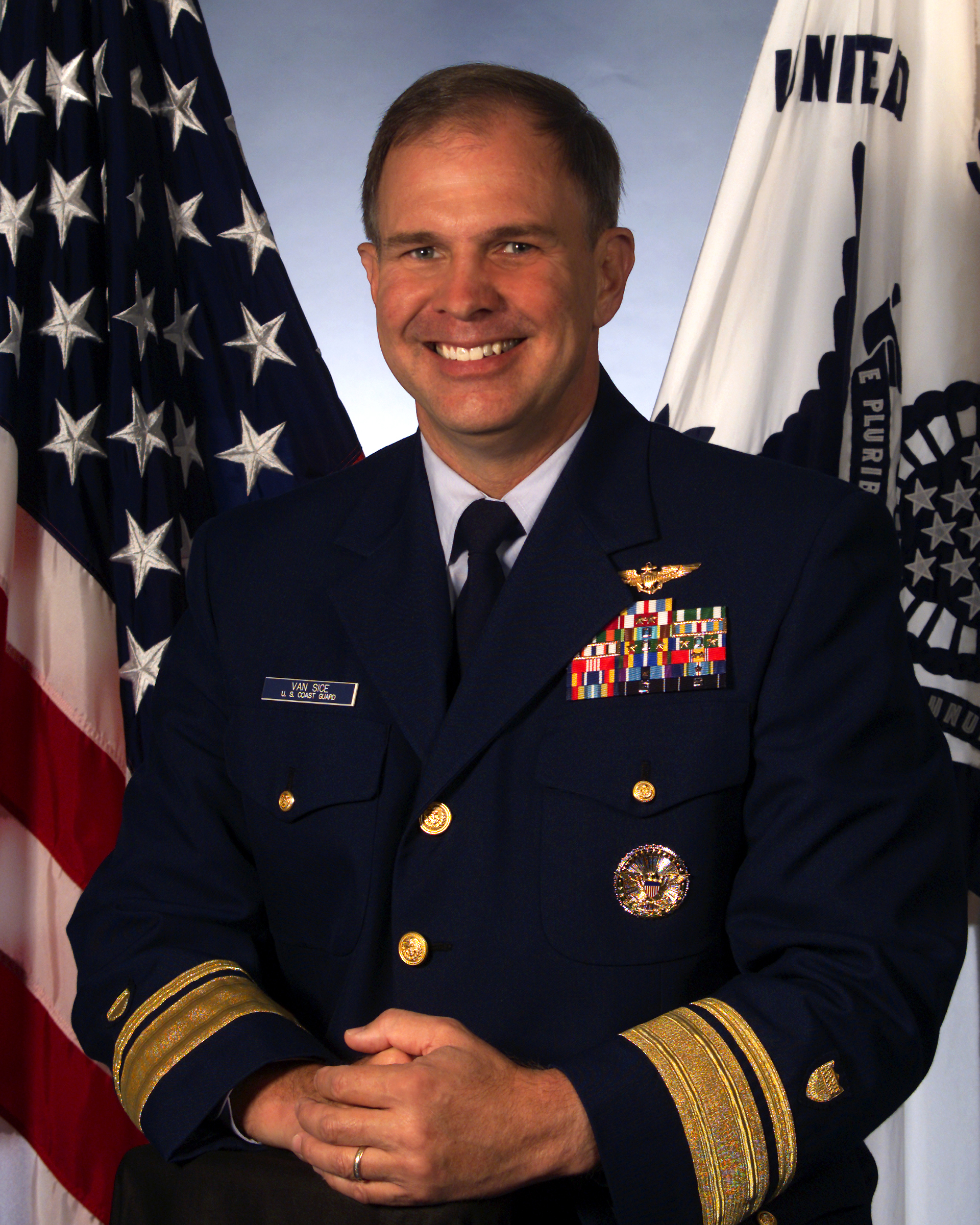
- Van Sice in 2005

38th Superintendent of the United States Coast Guard Academy
- In office May 27, 2005 – January 2007
- President: George W. Bush
- Preceded by: Robert C. Olsen
- Succeeded by: J. Scott Burhoe
- Military career
- Allegiance: United States
- Branch: United States Coast Guard
- Service years: 1970–2007
- Rank: Rear Admiral Upper Half
- Commands: United States Coast Guard Academy; Coast Guard Air Station Borinquen
- Conflicts: Cold War
- Awards: Defense Superior Service Medal; Meritorious Service Medal; Coast Guard Commendation Medal

James C. Van Sice is a retired Rear Admiral (upper half) in the United States Coast Guard. He was the 38th Superintendent of the United States Coast Guard Academy in New London, Connecticut, succeeding Rear Admiral Robert C. Olsen. He was succeeded by Rear Admiral J. Scott Burhoe. Rear Admiral Van Sice retired from the Coast Guard in 2007. .

== Retirement ==
In 2006 Van Sice requested retirement following an investigation.. Cmdr. Jeff Carter, spokesman for the service, said information about Van Sice arose during the task force's review of the academy. Members of the task force decided the information was 'beyond the scope of their charter,' so they forwarded the matter to the Coast Guard chief of staff, Vice Adm. Robert Papp, who had formed the task force.

Papp assigned another rear admiral, Larry L. Hereth, to conduct an 'administrative investigation' into the matter. Carter said the administrative review didn't play into the job switch for Van Sice and that Van Sice's new job as director of personnel management shows that his superiors still have 'confidence he can effectively serve.' Van Sice's new job puts him in charge of pay, recruiting, housing and personnel policy for the entire 56,000 member Coast Guard. By the second week in January, Burhoe, who leaves a job as Assistant Commandant for governmental and public affairs in Washington, will be in charge of the school as it deals with the fallout from two recent sexual assault cases involving cadets. The timing of the job switch, according to a statement from Papp, is based on the expected release of the task force's findings next month. Burhoe will lend a 'fresh perspective' to act on the task force's recommendations for the school. Carter said Burhoe is somebody 'who has not been involved in any of the issues the task force is looking at.' It was after Van Sice took command of the 130-year-old school that an internal investigation resulted in sexual assault charges being brought against a cadet, Webster Smith.

== Education ==
Van Sice graduated in 1974 from the United States Coast Guard Academy. He later earned a Master of Science in Engineering from Purdue University and a Master of Arts degree in business from Webster College.

== Coast Guard assignments ==
Rear Admiral Van Sice's first duty assignment was aboard the Coast Guard Cutter Munro (WHEC 724) where he served as Anti-Submarine Warfare Officer and Deck Watch Officer. In 1976 he graduated from Naval Flight Training in Pensacola, Florida. An aircraft commander and instructor pilot in the C-131 Convair and HU-25 Falcon aircraft, Rear Admiral Van Sice has approximately 5,000 total hours in fixed and rotary wing aircraft.

Van Sice has served in a variety of command and staff assignments including Chief of Operations and Chief of Staff for the Eighth Coast Guard District in New Orleans, Louisiana, Commander of Coast Guard Air Station Borinquen, Puerto Rico, and operational command experience on the Gulf of Mexico and in the Pacific Northwest.

He served as the first Deputy Director of Operations, United States Northern Command, Peterson Air Force Base, Colorado. In this position, he advised the Commander on operations to deter, prevent, defeat, and mitigate threats and aggression aimed at the United States, its territories and interests. He ensured effective air, land, and maritime defense throughout the assigned area of responsibility to include military assistance to civil authorities.

Prior to assuming the position of Superintendent at the Coast Guard Academy, Van Sice was the Director of Reserve and Training for the U.S. Coast Guard where he served as a member of the Reserve Forces Policy Board, which advises the Secretary of Defense on Reserve matters.

== Military awards ==

Coast Guard Aviator Badge
Defense Distinguished Service Medal
Legion of Merit	Meritorious Service Medal w/ 2 award stars	Coast Guard Commendation Medal
Coast Guard Achievement Medal	Commandant's Letter of Commendation Ribbon w/Operational Distinguishing Device	Joint Meritorious Unit Award
Secretary of Transportation Outstanding Unit Award	Coast Guard Unit Commendation	Coast Guard Meritorious Unit Commendation w/ 2 award stars
Meritorious Team Commendation	Coast Guard Bicentennial Unit Commendation	National Defense Service Medal w/ 2 service star
Global War on Terrorism Service Medal	Humanitarian Service Medal w/ 1 service star	Special Operations Service Ribbon w/ 1 service star
Coast Guard Sea Service Ribbon	Expert Rifle Medal	Expert Pistol Medal
Office of the Secretary of Defense Identification Badge

== Personal data ==
Van Sice is a native of Wilmington, Delaware. He is married to the former Clarke Hutchinson of Wilmington, Delaware. Rear Admiral and Mrs. Van Sice have two children.
