= Martin H. Daniell =

United States Coast Guard vice admiral (born 1935)

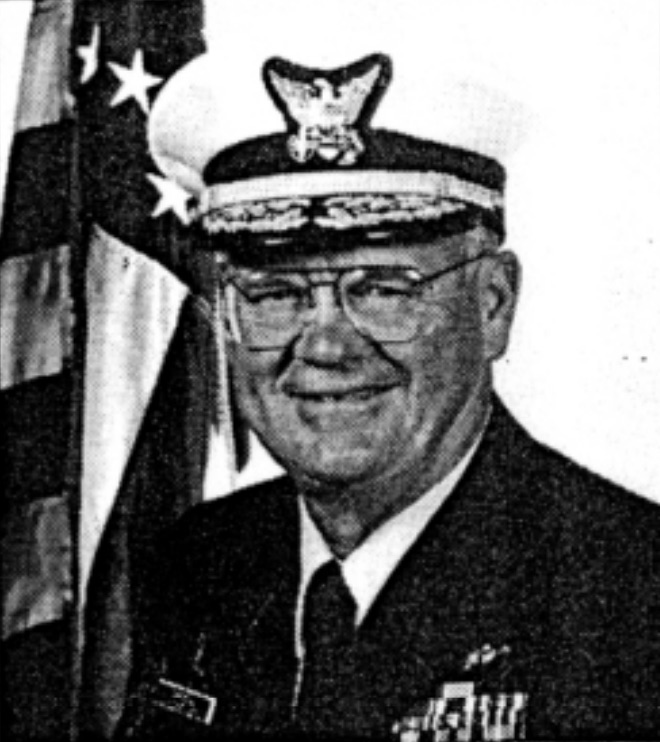
- Born: June 10, 1935 (age 91); Guanica, Puerto Rico, U.S.
- Military career
- Allegiance: United States
- Branch: United States Coast Guard
- Service years: ?–1994
- Rank: Vice admiral
- Commands: Vice Commandant of the United States Coast Guard

Martin Haynes Daniell, Jr. (born June 10, 1935) is a retired vice admiral in the United States Coast Guard who served as vice commandant from 1990 to 1992. He is the son of Martin H. and Winifred (née Marvin) Daniell. Prior to serving as vice commandant, he was commander of the Seventh Coast Guard District. During that time he also headed a drug task force in Southern Florida and in the Southeast Region of the National Narcotics Border Interdiction System. He had also been stationed at the Coast Guard headquarters, where he was chief, operational law enforcement division; deputy chief, office of operations; deputy chief of staff of the Coast Guard; and chief of the office of navigation. Daniell received a Bachelor of Arts degree in economics from Dartmouth College, Hanover, Hew Hampshire, in 1957 and earned Master of Science degree in management from the Naval Postgraduate School, Monterey, California. Daniell was born in Ensenada, Guanica, Puerto Rico. He is married to Carolyn Betancourt and has three children Abby, Jennifer and LTJG Martin H. Daniell, III, U.S.N.

His awards include the Coast Guard Distinguished Service Medal, Legion of Merit with gold star, the Meritorious Service Medal with gold star, and three Coast Guard Commendation Medals with operational distinguishing device.

Military offices
Preceded by Clyde T. Lusk	Vice Commandant of the United States Coast Guard; 1990–1992	Succeeded by Robert T. Nelson
