= J. Scott Burhoe =

United States Coast Guard admiral

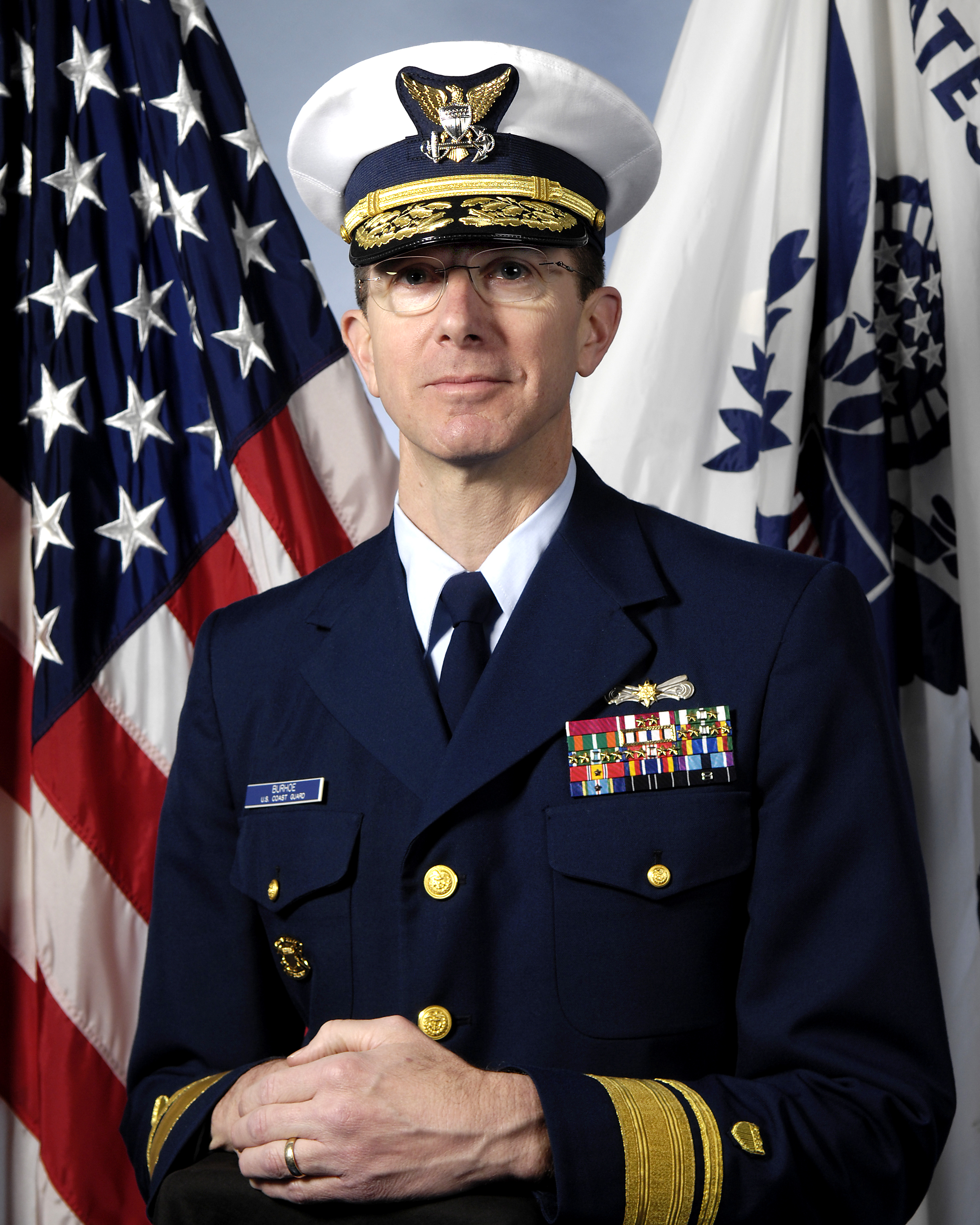
- Burhoe in 2008

39th Superintendent of the United States Coast Guard Academy
- In office January 2007 – June 3, 2011
- President: George W. Bush; Barack Obama
- Preceded by: James C. Van Sice
- Succeeded by: Sandra L. Stosz

Personal details
- Born: John Scott Burhoe; September 12, 1954 (age 72)
- Military career
- Allegiance: United States of America
- Branch: United States Coast Guard
- Service years: 1977–2011
- Rank: Rear Admiral
- Unit: United States Coast Guard Academy
- Awards: Legion of Merit, Coast Guard Meritorious Service Medal (3), Coast Guard Commendation Medal (3) Flag of Rear Admiral, USCG

Rear Admiral John Scott Burhoe (born September 12, 1954) was the 39th Superintendent of the United States Coast Guard Academy in New London, Connecticut from 2007 to 2011. His previous position was Assistant Commandant for Governmental and Public Affairs at Coast Guard Headquarters in Washington, D.C. He earned his commission after graduating from Officer Candidate School in 1977. He is the first non-Academy graduate to lead the school in at least one hundred years.

His first assignment out of OCS was to lead the USCG Ceremonial Honor Guard in Washington, D.C. In his 30 years of public service, he has served in a variety of operational and staff assignments including Executive Officer and Alternate Captain of the Port, Coast Guard Station New London, Connecticut, Commanding Officer, Station Fort Lauderdale, Florida, and Group Commander, Group Sandy Hook, New Jersey.

Burhoe's staff assignments have been focused primarily in the human resource specialty at Training Center Cape May, the USCG Academy with the Leadership Development Center, Training Center Yorktown, Virginia, Coast Guard Headquarters, and as the Chief of the Officer Personnel Management Division at the Coast Guard Personnel Command.

He graduated from Virginia Polytechnic Institute and State University (better known as Virginia Tech) with a Bachelor of Science degree in sociology. He was a member of Theta Chi fraternity. He later earned a Master of Public Administration degree from The American University in Washington, D.C.

He and his wife Betsy have two grown children, Aaron and Amy.

On June 3, 2011, Rear Admiral Burhoe retired from the U.S. Coast Guard after 34 years service. RADM Burhoe became the 10th President of Fork Union on July 18, 2011, assuming command from Lieutenant General John E. Jackson, United States Air Force (Ret.), who retired on July 1, 2011, after 17 years as the 9th President of Fork Union Military Academy of Fork Union, Virginia. RADM Burhoe retired as Superintendent of FUMA on July 1, 2018.

Rear Admiral Burhoe resided in Careby Hall, an 1895 Victorian house which was the home of the school's founder, Dr. William Hatcher.

== Awards and honors ==
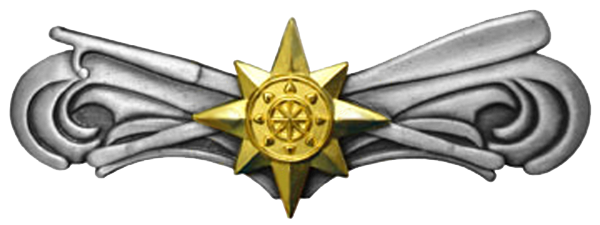
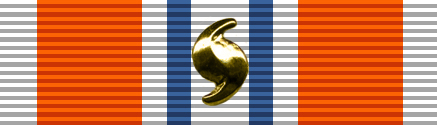
| USCG Boat Force Operations Advanced BW CG Honor Guard Badge |
| Legion of Merit |
| Meritorious Service Medal with two gold award stars |
| Coast Guard Commendation Medal with two gold award stars and "O" device |
| Coast Guard Achievement Medal |
| Coast Guard Presidential Unit Citation with "hurricane symbol" |
| Secretary of Transportation Outstanding Unit Award |
| Coast Guard Unit Commendation with 4 award stars and "O" device |
| Coast Guard Meritorious Unit Commendation with 4 award stars and "O" device |
| Navy Meritorious Unit Commendation Ribbon |
| Meritorious Team Commendation with 4 award gold stars and "O" device |
| Coast Guard Bicentennial Unit Commendation |
| National Defense Service Medal with 1 bronze service star |
| Humanitarian Service Medal |
| Special Operations Service Ribbon with 1 bronze star service star |
| Rifle Marksmanship Medal |
| Pistol Marksmanship Ribbon with silver sharpshooter |
