= Chester R. Bender =

United States Coast Guard admiral (1914–1966)

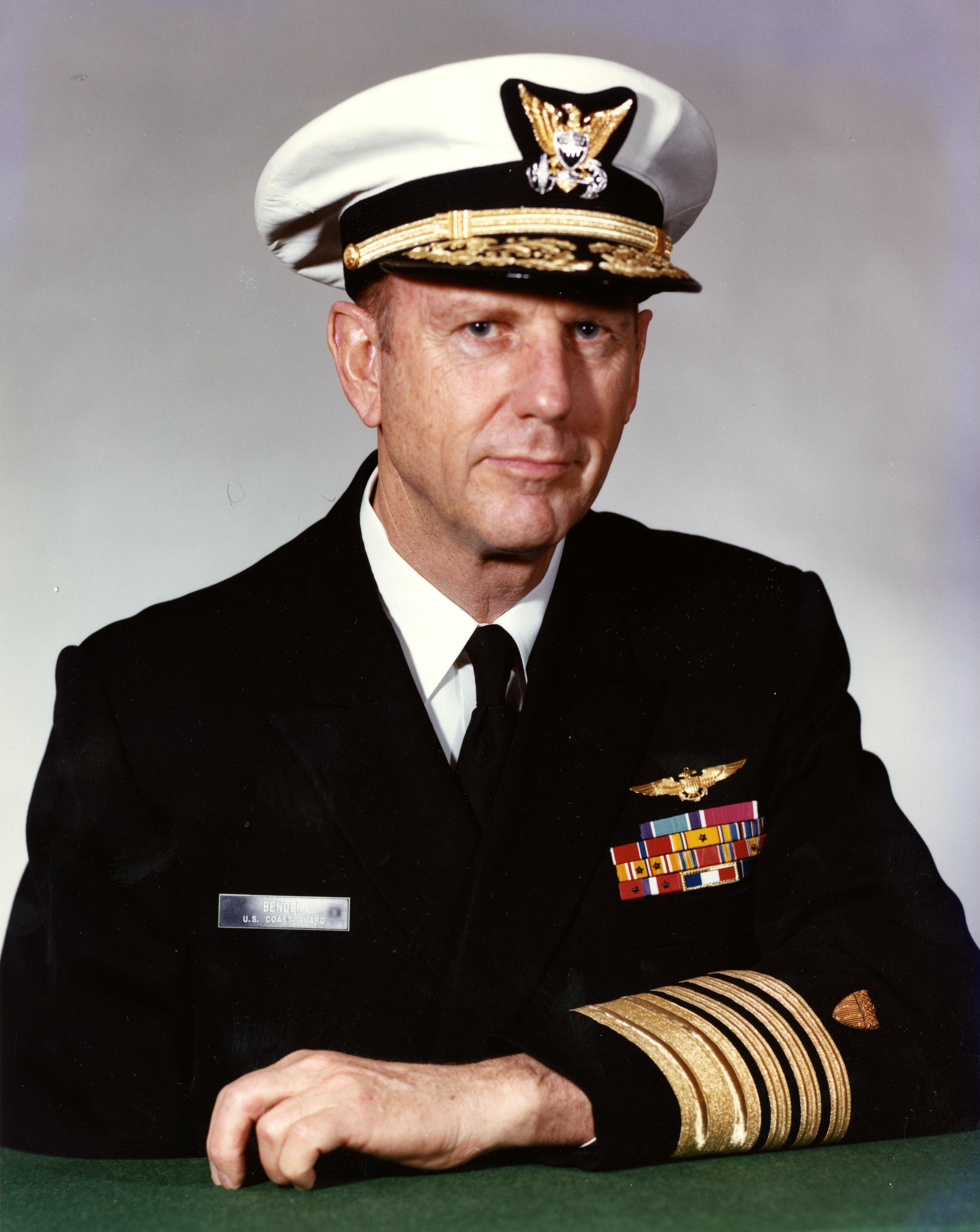
- Born: 14 March 1914; Burnsville, West Virginia, U.S.
- Died: 20 July 1996 (aged 82); Moraga, California, U.S.
- Burial place: Arlington National Cemetery, Arlington County, Virginia, U.S.
- Military career
- Allegiance: United States
- Branch: United States Coast Guard
- Rank: Admiral
- Commands: Commandant
- Conflicts: World War II Asiatic-Pacific Campaign
- Awards: Distinguished Service Medal

Chester R. Bender (March 14, 1914 – July 20, 1996) served as the fourteenth Commandant of the United States Coast Guard from 1970 to 1974. He also served as Superintendent of the United States Coast Guard Academy from 1965 to 1967.

== Early life and education ==
Bender was born in Burnsville, West Virginia, on March 14, 1914, and later moved with his parents John I. Bender and Inez Harbert Bender, to Plant City, Florida in 1925. In 1932, he was appointed as a cadet at the United States Coast Guard Academy at New London, Connecticut. During his time at the academy, he served two years on the boxing squad and as humor editor of Tide Rips, the academy yearbook. He served as gun captain during his senior year. He graduated from the academy on June 8, 1936 and received a bachelor of science degree and a commission as a Coast Guard ensign. He was the first Floridian to graduate from the academy.

== Career ==
=== Early assignments ===
Upon graduation from the academy, Bender's initial assignment was as a line officer aboard Coast Guard cutters Mendota and Bibb, on patrol in the Atlantic Ocean. In 1938, he was transferred to Ossipee, on duty in the Great Lakes region. During this tour of duty, he met and married Annamarie Ransom of Sault Sainte Marie, Michigan on September 1, 1939. Their marriage lasted until her death in 1992. They had one son, Mark A. Bender. That same year, he was selected for flight training and reported for duty at Naval Air Station Pensacola, Florida. A year later, he earned his aviator wings and was assigned to Coast Guard Air Station Elizabeth City.

=== World War II ===
During World War II, he flew anti-submarine patrols out of Elizabeth City, North Carolina. From June 1943 to December 1944, he commanded an air-rescue squadron based out of San Diego, California. During the last few months of the war, he served as air-sea rescue advisor and liaison officer for the Far East Air Force Headquarters, in the Philippines, earning the Bronze Star for his service.

=== Mid-career assignments ===
In December 1945, he was assigned to U.S. Coast Guard headquarters, as the executive officer of the Air-Sea Rescue Agency. From 1946 to 1950, he served as personal aide and pilot to U.S. Coast Guard Commandant Joseph F. Farley. In 1950, Bender was transferred to Coast Guard Air Station St. Petersburg, Florida, where he served as executive officer. In 1953 he assumed command of the Coast Guard Air Station Traverse City, Michigan. In 1955, he returned to Coast Guard headquarters, assuming command of the War Plans Division. Three years later in 1958, he was promoted to captain and given command of the Coast Guard Air Station Barbers Point, Hawaii.

In 1959, after two decades of aviation duty, he assumed command of Bering Strait, based in Honolulu, Hawaii. From 1961 to 1964, he served as mobilization and readiness officer for the San Francisco, California-based Western Area Command. On July 1, 1964 Bender was promoted to the rank of rear admiral and assumed command of the Cleveland, Ohio-based Ninth Coast Guard District. From 1965 to 1967, he served as superintendent of the United States Coast Guard Academy. During his tenure, he established the U.S. Coast Guard Museum in order to preserve and display artifacts from early Coast Guard history. From 1967 to 1970, he served as commander of the San Francisco-based Twelfth Coast Guard District, where he was responsible for most Coast Guard operations in the Pacific Ocean, Northern California, and most of Nevada and Utah.

=== Commandant of the U.S. Coast Guard ===
On April 16, 1970, Bender was nominated by U.S. President Richard Nixon to replace Admiral Willard J. Smith as commandant. Following Senate confirmation, he took office on June 1, 1970. During his tenure, he implemented the distinctive "Bender Blues" uniforms, designed to distinguish the U.S. Coast Guard from the U.S. Navy. In 1972, he was awarded the Coast Guard Distinguished Service Medal. As commandant, Bender was known for his support of environmental protection and was recognized for his management of the U.S. Coast Guard's programs relating to new environmental responsibilities. In 1973, he served as delegate and alternate chairman of the American delegation to the Marine Pollution Conference of the International Maritime Organization in 1973.

== Later life and death ==
Following his retirement from the U.S. Coast Guard in 1974, Bender moved to Moraga, California. He died there on July 20, 1996 after a long illness and is buried at Arlington National Cemetery.

== Awards ==
- Distinguished Service Medal with gold star (two awards)
- Legion of Merit
- Bronze Star Medal
- American Defense Service Medal with star
- American Campaign Medal
- Asiatic-Pacific Campaign Medal with two bronze battle stars
- World War II Victory Medal
- National Defense Service Medal with star
- Philippine Presidential Unit Citation
- Philippine Liberation Medal with two bronze stars
- US Coast Guard Marksmanship Ribbon

== Dates of rank ==
Ensign	Lieutenant, Junior Grade	Lieutenant	Lieutenant Commander	Commander	Captain
O-1	O-2	O-3	O-4	O-5	O-6
June 8, 1936	~1938	~1940	~1943	~1944	~1955

Commodore	Rear Admiral	Vice Admiral	Admiral
O-7	O-8	O-9	O-10
Never held	July 1, 1964	June 1967	June 1, 1970

== Citations ==
Military offices
Preceded by Willard J. Smith	Commandant of the Coast Guard; 1970–1974	Succeeded by Owen W. Siler
