= Robert T. Nelson =

United States Coast Guard vice admiral (1936–2023)

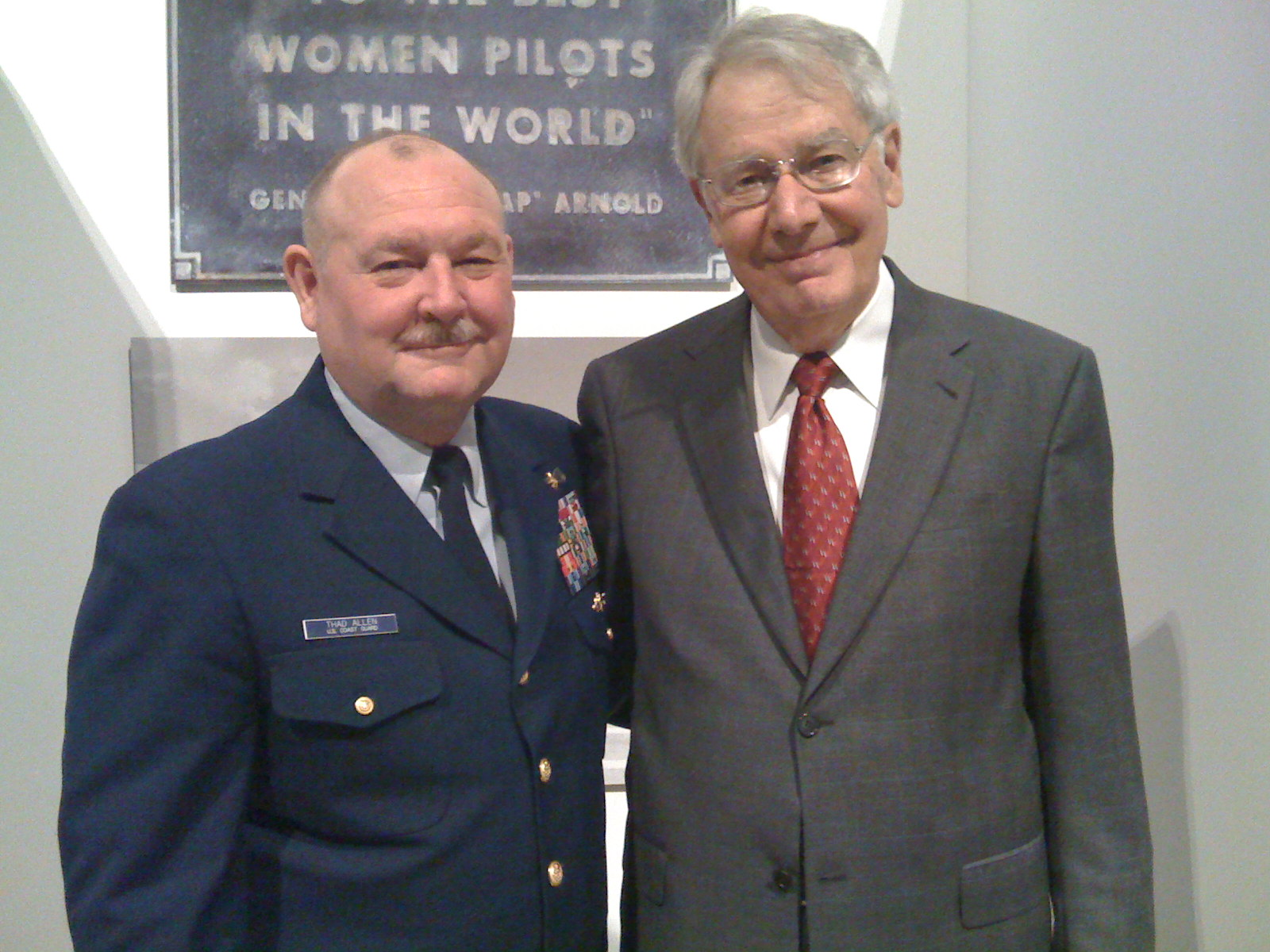
- Nelson (right) with Thad Allen in 2008
- Born: March 6, 1936; East Liverpool, Ohio, U.S.
- Died: June 4, 2023 (aged 87); Fairfax Station, Virginia, U.S.
- Burial place: Arlington National Cemetery
- Military career
- Allegiance: United States
- Branch: United States Coast Guard
- Service years: c. 1958 – 1994
- Rank: Vice admiral
- Commands: Vice Commandant of the United States Coast Guard

Robert Theodore Nelson (March 6, 1936 – June 4, 2023) was a vice admiral in the United States Coast Guard who served as the 18th Vice Commandant from 1992 to 1994. He was previously Chief of Staff of the United States Coast Guard, Commanding Officer at Coast Guard Headquarters, Washington, D.C., Commander of the Second Coast Guard District, and Chief of the Office of Navigation Safety and Waterway Services at Coast Guard Headquarters. He graduated from the United States Coast Guard Academy in 1958. He also was an alumnus of George Washington University.

His awards included the Distinguished Service Medal, two Legions of Merit, the Bronze Star with Combat Device, two Meritorious Service Medals, Coast Guard Commendation and Achievement Medals with Operational Distinguishing Device. He was also authorized to wear the Cutterman's Insignia. Born in East Liverpool, Ohio in 1936, Nelson was married to Patricia May Bennett, originally of Youngstown, Ohio, and had three children, two daughters and a son.

He died in Fairfax Station, Virginia on June 4, 2023.

Military offices
Preceded by Martin H. Daniell	Vice Commandant of the United States Coast Guard; 1992–1994	Succeeded by Arthur E. Henn
