= William J. Ecker =

William Joseph Ecker
- Born: November 1, 1938
- Died: September 1, 2011 (aged 72); Virginia Beach, Virginia, U.S.
- Military career
- Allegiance: United States of America
- Branch: United States Coast Guard
- Rank: Rear Admiral (Upper Half)
- Conflicts: Vietnam War

William J. Ecker (November 1, 1938 – September 1, 2011) was a United States Coast Guard rear admiral.

== Early life and education ==
Ecker was a native of Brooklyn. He died on September 1, 2011, in Virginia Beach, Virginia.

== Career ==
Ecker graduated from the United States Coast Guard Academy in 1960. He served aboard USCGC Westwind, USCGC Winnebago and USCGC Resolute. During the Vietnam War, he served aboard USCGC Mellon. His first flag assignment was as Commander, Second Coast Guard District in Saint Louis, Missouri. Ecker later served as Commander, Fifth Coast Guard District headquartered at Portsmouth, Virginia.

Awards Ecker received during his career include the Legion of Merit, the Meritorious Service Medal, the Coast Guard Commendation Medal and the Navy Commendation Medal.
