= United States Coast Guard Academy =

Service academy in New London, Connecticut, U.S.

- Former names: Revenue Cutter Service School of Instruction (1876–1914); Revenue Cutter Academy (1914–1915)
- Motto: Scientiæ Cedit Mare (Latin)
- Motto in English: The sea yields to knowledge
- Type: U.S. Service Academy
- Established: 1876; 150 years ago
- Superintendent: Gregory C. Rothrock
- Provost: Amy K. Donahue
- Commandant of Cadets: Aaron J. Casavant
- Faculty: 175
- Students: 1,108 cadets (As of spring 2026)
- Location: New London, Connecticut, United States; 41°22′22″N 72°06′06″W
- Campus: 103 acres (42 ha); Suburban 103 acres (420,000 m^{2})
- Fight song: "Semper Paratus"
- Colors: Blue and orange
- Nickname: Bears
- Sporting affiliations: NCAA Division III – NEWMAC; NEISA
- Mascot: Objee the Bear
- Athletics: 24 varsity teams
- Website: uscga.edu

The United States Coast Guard Academy (USCGA), located in New London, Connecticut, is the U.S. service academy specifically for the United States Coast Guard. Founded in 1876, the academy provides education to future Coast Guard officers in one of nine major fields of study.

Students are officers-in-training, and are referred to as cadets. Upon graduation, cadets receive a Bachelor of Science degree and commission in the U.S. Coast Guard as an ensign. In exchange for their debt-free education valued at over $500,000, graduates incur a five-year active-duty service obligation, (Note: Cadets who do not graduate after their 2nd year (due to grades, conduct, etc) are obligated to enlist or pay back the monetary value of their education.) with additional years if the graduate attends flight school or subsequent government-funded graduate school. Out of approximately 300 cadets entering the academy each summer, around 250 graduate. Cadets choose from nine majors, with a curriculum that is graded according to their performance in a holistic program of academics, military bearing, physical fitness, character, and leadership.

Cadets are required to adhere to the academy's "Honor Concept," "Who lives here reveres honor, honors duty," which is emblazoned in the walls of the academy's entrance. The academy's motto is Scientiæ Cedit Mare, which is Latin for "the sea yields to knowledge". Its academic programs are accredited by the New England Commission of Higher Education.

== History ==
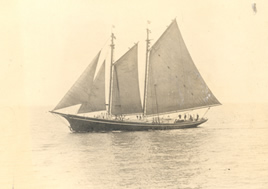
Historic photograph of the USRC Dobbin

The roots of the academy lie in the "School of Instruction of the Revenue Cutter Service", the school of the Revenue Cutter Service. The School of Instruction was established near New Bedford, Massachusetts in 1876 and used USRC James C. Dobbin for its exercises. Captain John Henriques served as superintendent from founding until 1883. The one civilian instructor was Professor Edwin Emery, who taught mathematics, astronomy, English composition, French, physics, theoretical steam engineering, history, international law, and revenue law, among other subjects. The school was a two-year apprenticeship, in essence, supplemented by minimal classroom work.

The student body averaged five to ten cadets per class. With changes to new training vessels, the school moved to Curtis Bay, Baltimore in 1900 and to Fort Trumbull in 1910, a Revolutionary War–era Army installation in New London, Connecticut. In 1914, the school became the Revenue Cutter Academy, and then the Coast Guard Academy in 1915 with the merger of the Revenue Cutter Service and the United States Life-Saving Service to form the U.S. Coast Guard.

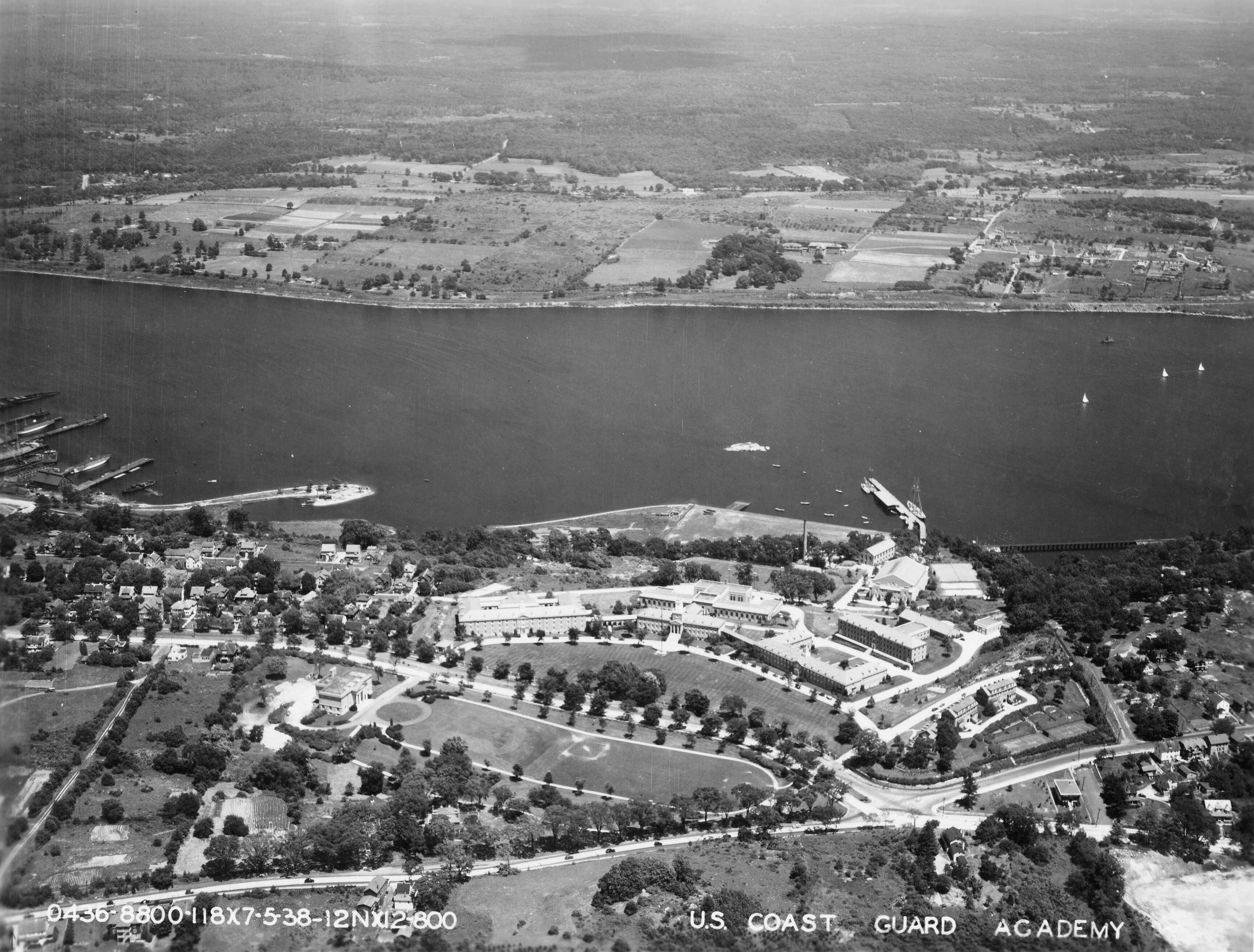
Aerial view, 1938

Land was purchased in New London on 31 July 1930 for the construction of the Coast Guard Academy. The 40-acre site was made up of two parcels from the Allyn and Payne estates and was purchased for $100,000. The $100,000 was not raised through a bond issue, as originally planned, but with a bank loan based on uncollected back taxes. The contract was awarded to Murch Brothers Construction Company of St. Louis and ground was broken in January 1931 by Jean Hamlet, daughter of Rear Admiral Harry G. Hamlet, Academy Superintendent from 1928 to 1932. On 15 May 1931, Treasury Secretary Andrew W. Mellon visited New London to lay the cornerstone of Hamilton Hall. Construction proceeded relatively on schedule and cadets moved in to the new buildings on 20 September 1932.

In 1946, the academy received the barque Horst Wessel as a war reparation from Germany, a 295-foot tall ship which was renamed USCGC Eagle. It remains the main training vessel for cadets at the academy as well as for officer candidates at the Coast Guard's Officer Candidate School, which is located on the grounds of the academy.

The academy was racially integrated in 1962 at the request of President Kennedy. The academy began admitting women in 1976 at the request of Congress.

In 2018, the academy emblem was redesigned by Nick Desjardins of the Biddeford Regional Center of Technology.

In December 2023, House Committee on Oversight and Accountability and Subcommittee on National Security, the Border, and Foreign Affairs opened a probe into the USCG’s mishandling of serious misconduct, including racism, hazing, discrimination, sexual harassment, sexual assault, and rape, and the withholding of internal investigations into these offenses from Congress and the public. The Coast Guard had conducted Operation Fouled Anchor, an investigation that ran from 2014 to 2019 that reviewed more than 100 allegations of sexual assault at the academy made from the early 1990s to 2006 and how they were handled. Coast Guard officials, however, did not fully disclose its existence to Congress or the public until last year.

== Admission ==
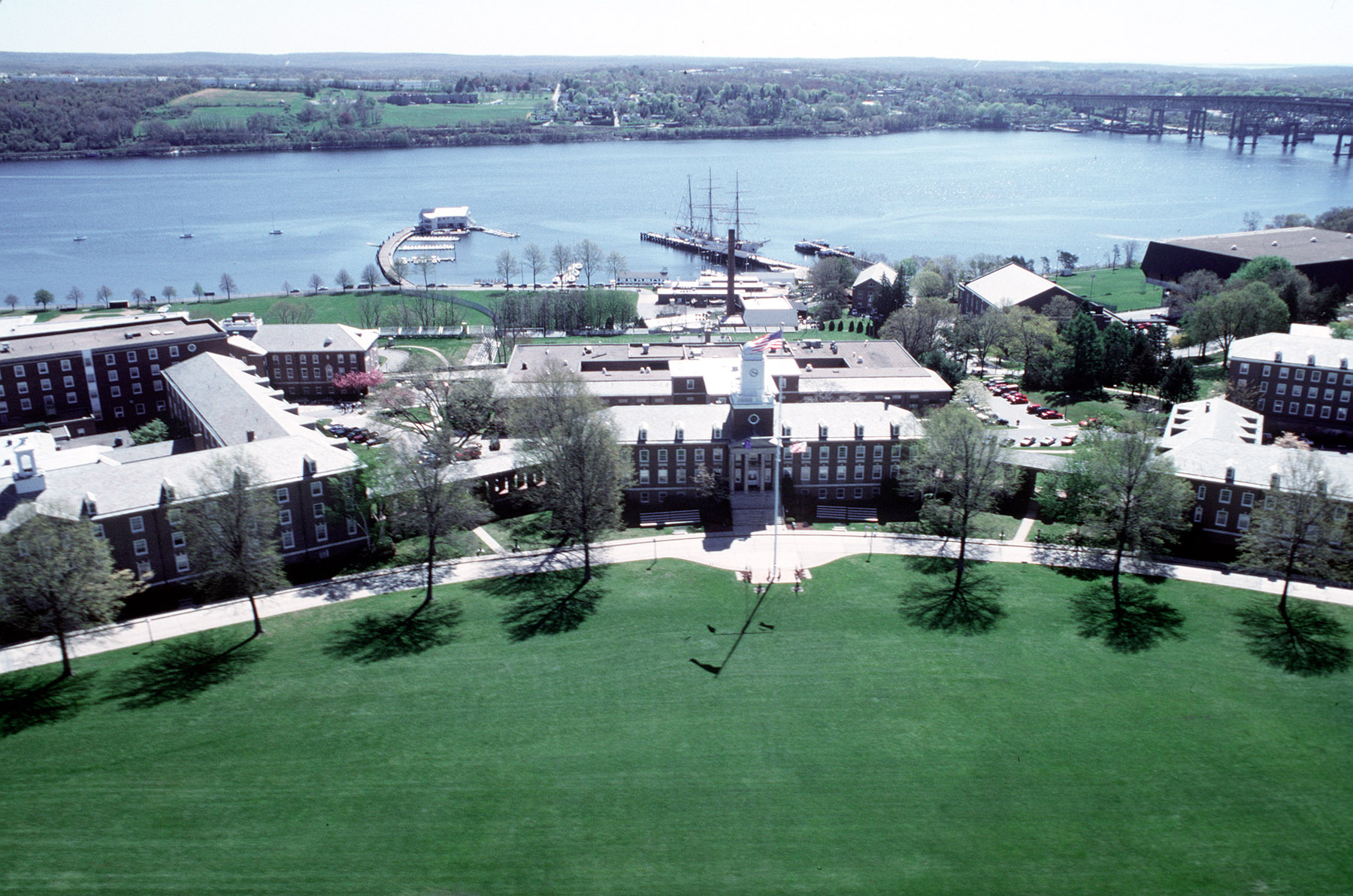
Aerial view of Washington Parade field and campus

Unlike the other service academies, admission to the USCGA does not require a congressional nomination. This is due to the fervent objections of Captain John A. Henriques, the first Superintendent of the Revenue Cutter School of Instruction (later the Revenue Cutter Academy). His objection stemmed from years of poor political appointments in the U.S. Revenue Cutter Service's bureaucracy. However, under the Compacts of Free Association between the United States and the Republics of Palau, Micronesia and the Marshall Islands, the USCGA is obliged to at all times have at least one student enrolled who is nominated by the governments of each of those states.

Each year more than 2,000 students apply and appointments are offered until the number accepting appointments to the incoming class numbers reaches approximately 400; the average entering class size is 300 cadets. Those who have received appointments as cadets report to the USCGA in late June or early July for "Swab Summer", a basic military training program designed to prepare them for the rigors of their Fourth Class year. After four years of study and training, approximately 250 of those cadets will graduate. About 40 percent of cadets are women.

== Academics ==
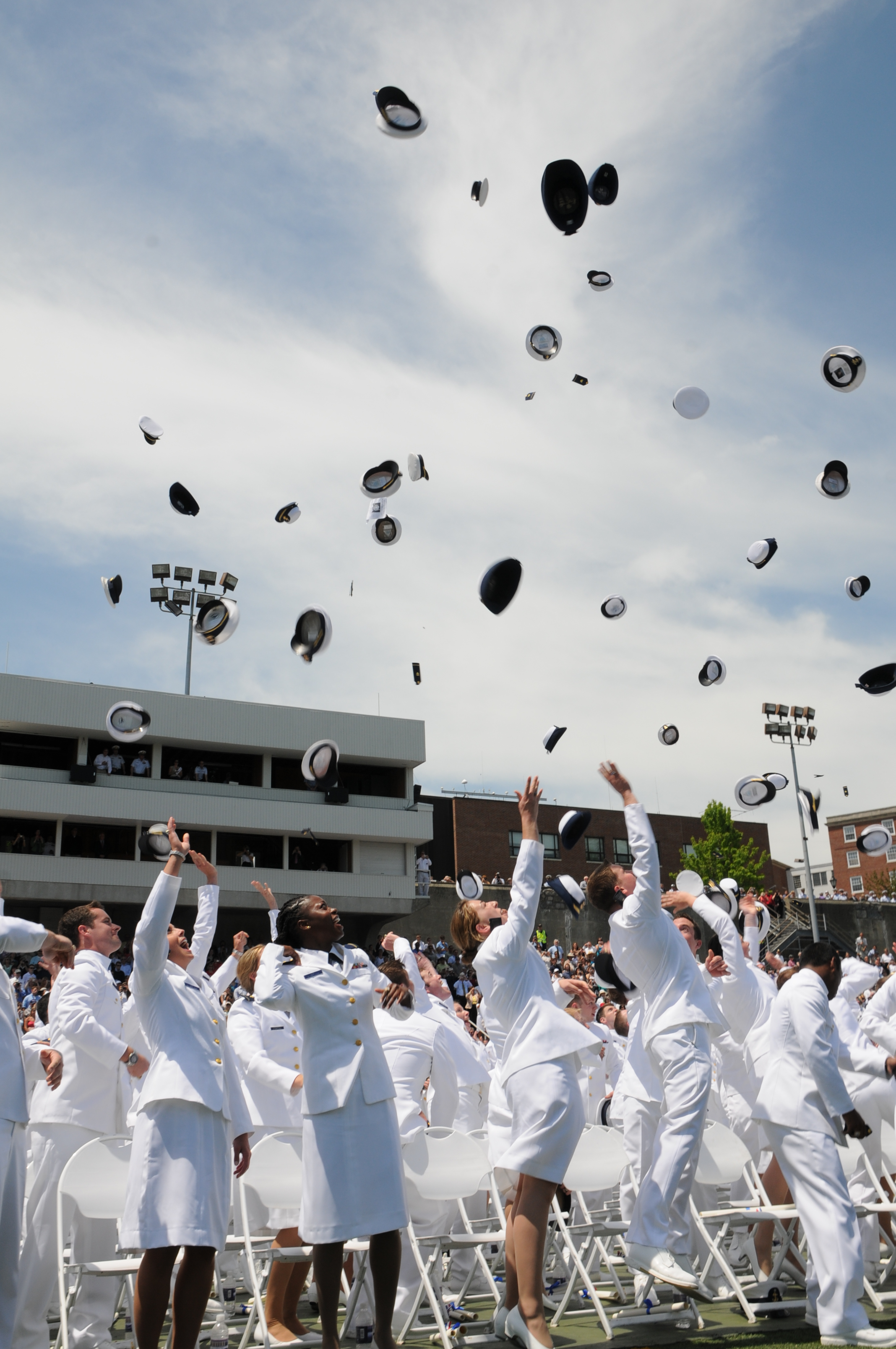
An academy class graduating

All graduating cadets earn commissions as ensigns in the United States Coast Guard, as well as Bachelor of Science degrees. For that reason the academy maintains a core curriculum of science and professional development courses in addition to major-specific courses. Each cadet takes two semesters of classes during the school year and then spends the majority of the summer in military training to produce officers of character with the requisite professional skills. Among these are courses in leadership, ethics, organizational behavior, and nautical science.

The majority of cadets report to their first units after graduating, which are either afloat units, shore units, or basic flight training as student naval aviators, with the training conducted under the auspices of the U.S. Navy. Those that are assigned afloat serve as either deck watch officers or student engineers.

Professional maritime studies courses help prepare cadets in piloting, voyage planning, deck seamanship, and all aspects of ship-handling, as well as Coast Guard leadership and administrative duties.

=== Majors ===
Academics at the USCGA stress the sciences and engineering, but different courses of study are available. In addition, several of the majors offer tracks of specialization (for example, marine and environmental science majors can choose to focus on biology, chemistry, or geophysics). Cadets sometimes opt to take elective courses with Connecticut College (adjacent the academy's campus) as part of an open exchange agreement.

=== Military training ===
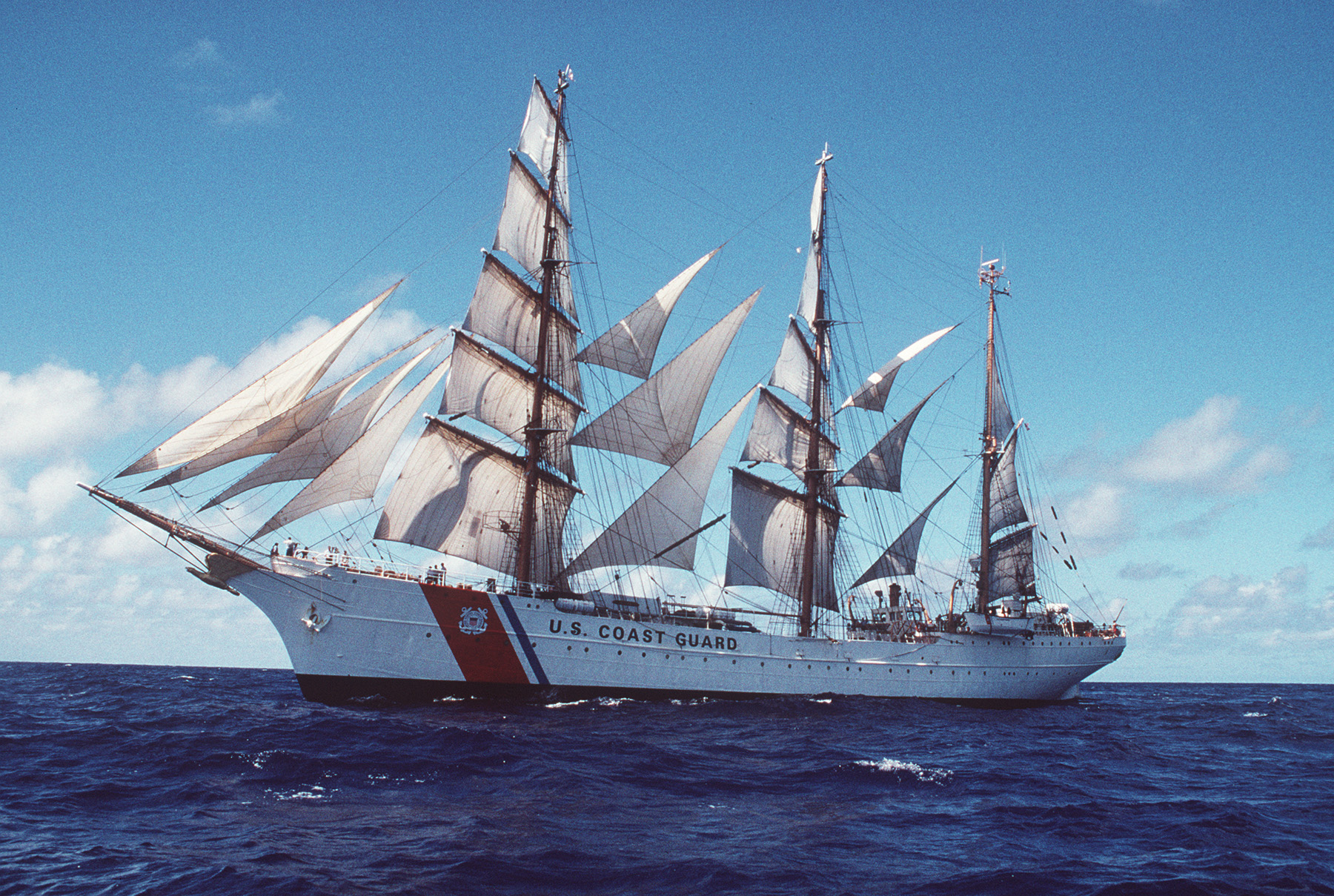
The barque USCGC Eagle (WIX-327), the United States' only active duty tall ship. The ship is used by the USCGA as a sail training ship.

Each summer, cadets participate in training programs according to their class. The summers are organized as follows:

- Swab Summer: The new class of freshmen report in to the academy, and are sworn into the military. They undergo a seven-week basic training program that culminates on a week-long voyage underway on the barque USCGC Eagle.
- Third-class (3/c) Summer: Five weeks aboard the USCGC Eagle training under sail, five weeks aboard an operational Coast Guard cutter or small boat station in the role of junior enlisted (i.e., standing watches as helmsman, lookout, quartermaster of the watch, or engineering watch).
- Second-class (2/c) Summer: damage control training, weapon qualifications, navigation rules certification, aviation internship, sail training program, and three weeks as members of the cadre, who train the incoming swabs.
- First-class (1/c) Summer: Ten weeks aboard an operational cutter in the role of a junior officer (i.e., standing bridge watches conning the ship as Officer of the Deck), or an optional internship for exceptional cadets who split their summer with five weeks at an internship and five weeks aboard a cutter.

Each week during the school year cadets participate in regimental review, a formal military drill. In addition, cadets perform a variety of military duties at the academy. Like all cadets and midshipmen at the United States service academies, Coast Guard cadets are on active duty in the military and wear uniforms at all times. Cadets receive a monthly stipend to pay for books, uniforms, and other necessities. Cadets receive monthly pay of $1,017.00, as of 2015. From this amount, pay is automatically deducted for the cost of uniforms, books, supplies, services, and other miscellaneous expenses.

== Organization of the Corps of Cadets ==
The Corps is organized as one regiment divided into eight companies, each of which is composed of about 120 cadets of all classes. Although the Corps of Cadets is supervised directly by the Commandant of Cadets (a Coast Guard officer with the rank of captain), the academy operates on the concept of "the Corps leading the Corps."

The Corps of Cadets is largely a self-directed organization that follows a standard military chain of command:

- 1st class cadets lead the corps
- 2nd class cadets are cadre in swab summer training and are primarily responsible for leading and developing 4th class cadets. They serve as mentors
- 3rd class cadets are role models to 4th class cadets
- 4th class cadets are responsible for learning and applying Coast Guard core values such as leadership, teamwork, attention to detail, accountability, etc.

The highest-ranking cadet in each company is the company commander, a first-class cadet ("firstie"), equivalent to a senior. Although each company has some leeway in their standards and practices, every company commander reports to the regimental staff which plans and oversees all aspects of cadet life. At the top of the cadet chain of command is the regimental commander, the highest ranking cadet. Command positions, both in companies and on regimental staff, are highly competitive, and a cadet's overall class rank is often a deciding factor in who is awarded the position.

The eight companies are named for the first eight letters of the NATO phonetic alphabet. Each has a special focus in administering day-to-day affairs: Alfa Company manages health and wellness. Bravo Company runs training. Charlie Company administers the honor system, Delta Company coordinates drill and ceremonies. Echo Company manages transportation and logistics. Foxtrot Company operates the cadet conduct system, organizes the watch rotations, and updates the cadet regulations. Golf Company is in charge of supplies for cleaning and repairing damaged rooms within Chase Hall. Hotel Company is in charge of morale events.

To accomplish their missions, each company is divided, along shipboard lines, into three departments, each of which is divided into divisions with specific responsibilities. Divisions are the most basic unit at the Coast Guard Academy, and each has a very specific purpose. Each division is led by a firstie and contains several members of each other class.

This organizational structure is designed to give every cadet a position of leadership and to emulate the structure of a Coast Guard cutter, in which the division officer and department head positions are filled by junior officers. Third-class cadets directly mentor the fourth-class in their division, just as junior petty officers would be responsible for the most junior enlisted personnel (non-rates). Second-class cadets act as non-commissioned officers, and ensure that the regulations and accountability are upheld. Firsties (like junior officers) are in supervisory roles, and are responsible for carrying out the mission of their divisions and ensuring the well-being of those under their command. Exchange cadets from the other federal service academies are also a part of the corps, and take part in many activities alongside their USCGA counterparts.

== Student life ==
Undergraduate demographics as of Fall 2023
Race and ethnicity	Total
White	63%
Hispanic	14%
Two or more races	11%
Asian	6%
Black	3%
International student	3%
Unknown	1%

=== Athletics ===
The USCGA Athletic Department offers 24 intercollegiate sports for cadets. The academy's athletics teams generally compete in Division III of the National Collegiate Athletic Association. Cadets devote two hours per academic day to athletic activities, either on varsity teams, club teams, or other sports pursuits. The academy nickname is the Bears, after the USRC Bear, which made a dramatic rescue in Alaska in 1897, shortly after the opening of the academy.

=== Music ===
Principal non-athletic activities are musical centered on Leamy Hall. Regimental Band, Windjammers Drum & Bugle Corps, various pep bands, and the NiteCaps Jazz Band are instrumental programs. Chapel Choirs, Glee Club, the Fairwinds all-female a cappella group, and The Idlers all-male sea shanty group are vocal programs.

=== Model UN ===
The academy's Model UN team was started in 2004, and has since been successfully competing around North America, and at the World Model UN Conference.

=== Pride ===
The academy has clubs and teams dedicated to increasing campus morale. These include the cheer squad, dance team and Social Committee.

== Notable alumni ==
Alumni of the Coast Guard Academy are known collectively as the "Long Blue Line".

Name	Class	Notability
Worth G. Ross	1879	Captain-Commandant; 3rd Commandant of the Coast Guard (1905–1911), member of the first graduating class of the School of Instruction
William E. Reynolds	1880	Rear Admiral; 5th Commandant of the Coast Guard (1919–1924)
Ellsworth P. Bertholf	1887	Commodore; last Captain-Commandant of the United States Revenue Cutter Service (1911–1915); 4th Commandant of the Coast Guard (1915–1919); awarded Congressional Gold Medal for participation in the Overland Relief Expedition
Leonidas I. Robinson	1889	First Academy graduate to die in the line of duty
Frederick C. Billard	1896	Rear Admiral; 6th Commandant of the Coast Guard (1924–1932); Superintendent of the United States Coast Guard Academy (1921–1924)
Harry G. Hamlet	1896	Vice Admiral; 7th Commandant of the Coast Guard (1932–1936); Superintendent of the United States Coast Guard Academy (1928–1932); Gold Lifesaving Medal recipient; author of the "Creed of the United States Coast Guardsman"
Russell R. Waesche	1906	Admiral; 8th Commandant of the Coast Guard (1936–1946); longest serving Commandant
Philip F. Roach	1907	Commodore; recipient of the Navy Cross
William J. Keester	1910	Rear Admiral; Commander of the 5th Coast Guard District
Joseph Stika	1911	Vice Admiral; recipient of the Navy Cross
Joseph F. Farley	1912	Admiral; 9th Commandant of the Coast Guard (1946–1950)
Elmer Fowler Stone	1913	United States Naval Aviator, piloted the NC-4 on the first naval transatlantic flight
Lyndon Spencer	1918	Vice Admiral; commanding officer of the USS Bayfield (APA-33) during World War II
Harold G. Bradbury	1920	Rear Admiral; commanding officer of the USS Leonard Wood (APA-12), USS Wakefield (AP-21) and USCGC Duane (WPG-33) during World War II; Commander of the 1st Coast Guard District
Merlin O'Neill	1921	Vice Admiral; 10th Commandant of the Coast Guard (1950–1954); 4th Vice Commandant of the Coast Guard (1946–1949)
Alfred C. Richmond	1924	Admiral; 11th Commandant of the Coast Guard (1954–1962)
Miles Imlay	1926	Rear Admiral; participated in the Normandy landings during World War II
Edward Thiele	1927	Rear Admiral; Engineer-in-Chief of the Coast Guard (1958–1961)
Carl B. Olsen	1928	Rear Admiral; Commander of the 8th Coast Guard District
Edwin J. Roland	1929	Admiral; 12th Commandant of the Coast Guard (1962–1966); 7th Vice Commandant of the Coast Guard (1962)
Allen Winbeck	1929	Rear Admiral; Commander of the 13th and 12th Coast Guard Districts
A. J. Carpenter	1933	Rear Admiral; Commander of the 11th and 3rd Coast Guard Districts
John Birdsell Oren	1933	Rear Admiral; Chief of Engineering
Willard J. Smith	1933	Admiral; 13th Commandant of the Coast Guard (1966–1970)
Chester R. Bender	1936	Admiral; 14th Commandant of the Coast Guard (1970–1974)
Chester I. Steele	1937	Rear Admiral; Commander of USCG Activities Europe (1964–1966) and the 2nd Coast Guard District (1966–1967)
Arthur B. Engel	1938	Rear Admiral; Superintendent of the Coast Guard Academy (1967–1970)
Benjamin F. Engel	1938	Vice Admiral; Commander of the 14th and 3rd Coast Guard Districts
Thomas R. Sargent III	1938	Vice Admiral; 11th Vice Commandant of the Coast Guard (1970–1974)
Orvan R. Smeder	1939	Rear Admiral; Chief of Research and Development; Commander of the 7th Coast Guard District
Ellis L. Perry	1941	Vice Admiral; 12th Vice Commandant of the Coast Guard (1974–1978)
Owen W. Siler	1943	Admiral; 15th Commandant of the Coast Guard (1974–1978)
Winford W. Barrow	1945	Rear Admiral; Commander of the 8th Coast Guard District (1974–1978)
G. William Miller	1945	Chairman of the Federal Reserve (1978–1979); United States Secretary of the Treasury (1979–1981)
John B. Hayes	1947	Admiral; 16th Commandant of the Coast Guard (1978–1982)
Robert A. Duin	1948	Rear Admiral; Commander of the 17th Coast Guard District
James S. Gracey	1949	Admiral; 17th Commandant of the Coast Guard (1982–1986)
Sidney A. Wallace	1949	Rear Admiral; Chief of Public and International Affairs (1975–1977)
Benedict L. Stabile	1950	Vice Admiral; 14th Vice Commandant of the Coast Guard
Paul A. Yost Jr.	1951	Admiral; 18th Commandant of the Coast Guard (1986–1990)
Robert S. Lucas	1952	Rear Admiral; Commander of the 17th Coast Guard District
James C. Irwin	1953	Vice Admiral; 15th Vice Commandant of the Coast Guard
Theodore J. Wojnar	1953	Rear Admiral; Commander of the 13th Coast Guard District
William P. Kozlovsky	1954	Rear Admiral; Commander of the 14th Coast Guard District
Clyde T. Lusk	1954	Vice Admiral; 16th Vice Commandant of the Coast Guard
J. William Kime	1957	Admiral; 19th Commandant of the Coast Guard (1990–1994)
Robert T. Nelson	1958	Vice Admiral; 18th Vice Commandant of the Coast Guard
William J. Ecker	1960	Rear Admiral; Commander of the 2nd and 5th Coast Guard Districts
Richard A. Appelbaum	1961	Rear Admiral; Chief of Law Enforcement and Defense Operations
Robert E. Kramek	1961	Admiral; 20th Commandant of the Coast Guard (1994–1998)
Arthur E. Henn	1962	Vice Admiral; 19th Vice Commandant of the Coast Guard
James C. Card	1964	Vice Admiral; 21st Vice Commandant of the Coast Guard
Richard D. Herr	1964	Vice Admiral; 20th Vice Commandant of the Coast Guard
James Loy	1964	Admiral; 21st Commandant of the Coast Guard (1998–2002); Acting Secretary United States Department of Homeland Security (2005), United States Deputy Secretary of Homeland Security (2003–2005); 2nd Administrator of the Transportation Security Administration (2002–2003);
Gordon G. Piche	1964	Rear Admiral; Director of Personnel Management of the Coast Guard; Commander of Maintenance and Logistics Command Pacific
Paul M. Blayney	1965	Rear Admiral; Commander of the Thirteenth Coast Guard District
Thomas H. Collins	1968	Admiral; 22nd Commandant of the Coast Guard (2002–2006); guided the Coast Guard after the terrorist attacks of 9/11; 22nd Vice Commandant of the Coast Guard (2000–2002)
John T. Tozzi	1968	Rear Admiral; Director of Information and Technology (1996–1997)
Merle J. Smith	1968	Commander; First African American cadet to graduate from the USCGA; CDR Merle J. Smith Consolidated Club named for him; Merle J. Smith Eclipse Legacy Endowment at USCGA also named for him.
Richard W. Schneider	1968	Rear Admiral; former senior reserve officer in the United States Coast Guard Reserve and 23rd President of Norwich University for 28 years.
Terry M. Cross	1970	Vice Admiral; 24th Vice Commandant of the Coast Guard
Thad Allen	1971	Admiral; Principal Federal Official for the response to Hurricane Katrina, Hurricane Rita and National Incident Commander for the response to the Deepwater Horizon oil spill in the Gulf Coast region; 23rd Commandant of the Coast Guard (2006–2010)
Ronald F. Silva	1971	Rear Admiral; Commander of the 9th Coast Guard District (2002–2004)
Charles D. Wurster	1971	Vice Admiral; national commodore of the Sea Scouting division of the Boy Scouts of America
Erroll M. Brown	1972	Rear Admiral; First African-American Coast Guard flag officer
Bruce E. Melnick	1972	Commander; First Coast Guard astronaut
Timothy S. Sullivan	1975	Rear Admiral; Senior Military Advisor and Operational Advisor to the United States Secretary of Homeland Security; Primary Military Coordinator between the United States Department of Homeland Security and United States Department of Defense
Robert J. Papp Jr.	1975	Admiral; 24th Commandant of the Coast Guard (2010–2014)
Paul A. Langlois	1976	Captain; Distinguished Flying Cross; USCGA Athletic Hall of Fame (2006); USCGA Hall of Heroes (2013); USCGA Distinguished Alumnus (2019)
David Pekoske	1977	7th Administrator of Transportation Security Administration (2017–Current); Vice Admiral; 26th Vice Commandant of the Coast Guard
Paul F. Zukunft	1977	Admiral; 25th Commandant of the Coast Guard (2014–2018)
14 Female Cadets	1980	First 14 female cadets who graduated from the USCGA.
Charles W. Ray	1981	Admiral; 31st Vice Commandant of the Coast Guard (2018 – 2021)
Sandra L. Stosz	1982	Vice Admiral; first female Academy graduate to achieve flag rank; former Superintendent of the United States Coast Guard Academy; first woman to command a United States military service academy.
Stephen E. Flynn	1982	PhD; author; chair at the Council on Foreign Relations
Karl L. Schultz	1983	Admiral; 26th Commandant of the Coast Guard (2018–2022)
Steve Andersen	1985	Rear Admiral; Judge Advocate General and Chief Counsel of the Coast Guard (2016–2020)
Daniel C. Burbank	1985	Commander; Second Coast Guard astronaut
Charles D. Michel	1985	Admiral; 30th Vice Commandant of the Coast Guard; first career judge advocate in any of the armed forces to achieve four-star rank.
Linda L. Fagan	1985	Admiral; 27th Commandant of the United States Coast Guard (2022–2025); first female service chief in the U.S. armed services.
Kevin E. Lunday	1987	Admiral; 28th Commandant of the United States Coast Guard (2026–present); 34th Vice Commandant of the Coast Guard (2024–2025)
Douglas M. Fears	1989	Rear Admiral; former Assistant to the President and Homeland Security Advisor; commander of Joint Interagency Task Force South (2020–2022)
Scott E. Langum	1993	Captain; former helicopter pilot who rescued 168 lives during Hurricane Katrina; current commander of Coast Guard Air Station Cape Cod (2018–present)
Christopher Raia	1998	22nd deputy director of the FBI (2026-present)
Andre Douglas	2008	Commander; selected for NASA Astronaut Group 23
Nikole P. Barnes	2017	Olympian; USCGA's first Olympic Athlete. Competed in the Tokyo Olympic Games in the Women's 470 (double-handed sailing). 3x Sailing All-American; 2016 Women's National Champion. 2016 Quantum Women College Sailor of the Year.

== Superintendents ==
No.	Portrait	Superintendent	Term start	Term end	Ref
Superintendents of the Revenue Cutter Service School of Instruction (1876–1914)
1		John A. Henriques	February 1877	June 1883	
2		Leonard G. Shepard	June 1883	April 1887	
3		Daniel B. Hodgsdon	April 1887	May 1890	
School was closed between 1890 and 1894 by U.S. president Benjamin Harrison
4		Joseph W. Congdon	April 1894	June 1895	
5		Oscar C. Hamlet	June 1895	November 1898	
6		David A. Hall	December 1898	October 1902	
7		William E. Reynolds	October 1902	January 1908	
8		John E. Reinburg	January 1908	February 1910	
9		William V.E. Jacobs	March 1910	June 1914	
Superintendent of the Revenue Cutter Academy (1914–1915)
10		Frederick C. Billard	June 1914	August 1918	
Superintendents of the United States Coast Guard Academy (1915–present)
11		Thaddeus G. Crapster	August 1918	March 1919	
12		Byron L. Reed	March 1919	October 1919	
13		William V.E. Jacobs	October 1919	March 1923	
14		Harold D. Hinckley	March 1923	May 1928	
15		Harry G. Hamlet	May 1928	June 1932	
16		Randolph Ridgely Jr.	September 1932	June 1935	
17		Edward Darlington Jones	July 1935	June 1940	
18		James Pine	July 1940	July 1947	
19		Wilfred N. Derby	August 1947	August 1950	
20		Arthur G. Hall	September 1950	August 1954	
21		Raymond J. Mauerman	September 1954	June 1957	
22		Frank A. Leamy	July 1957	February 1960	
23		Stephen H. Evans	February 1960	June 1962	
24		Willard J. Smith	June 1962	July 1965	
25		Chester R. Bender	July 1965	June 1967	
26		Arthur B. Engel	June 1967	June 1970	
27		John F. Thompson	June 1970	July 1973	
28		Joseph J. McClelland	July 1973	June 1974	
29		William A. Jenkins	June 1974	June 1977	
30		Malcolm E. Clark	June 1977	January 1981	
31		Charles E. Larkin	July 1981	June 1982	
32		Edward Nelson Jr.	June 1982	June 1986	
33		Richard P. Cueroni	June 1986	June 28, 1989	
34		Thomas T. Matteson	June 28, 1989	June 9, 1993	
35		Paul E. Versaw	June 9, 1993	June 20, 1997	
36		Douglas E. Teeson	June 20, 1997	June 2001	
37		Robert C. Olsen	June 2001	June 2005	
38		James C. Van Sice	May 27, 2005	January 2007	
39		J. Scott Burhoe	January 2007	June 3, 2011	
40		Sandra L. Stosz (Note: First woman superintendent)	June 3, 2011	June 1, 2015	
41		James E. Rendon	June 1, 2015	May 30, 2019	
42		William G. Kelly	May 30, 2019	May 26, 2023	
43		Michael J. Johnston	May 26, 2023	July 16, 2025	
44		Gregory C. Rothrock	July 16, 2025	present	

Table notes:

== U.S. Coast Guard Museum ==
The U.S. Coast Guard Museum is located in Waesche Hall on the grounds of the United States Coast Guard Academy. The museum's artifacts reflect the history of the U.S. Coast Guard and include ship models, carved figureheads, cannons, uniforms, medals, weapons, memorabilia and paintings. Visitors must bring a government-issued photo identification to enter the campus, and foreign visitors must make an appointment with the Curator before visiting the museum.

== See also ==
- United States service academies
  - United States Air Force Academy (USAFA)
  - United States Coast Guard Academy (USCGA)
  - United States Merchant Marine Academy (USMMA)
  - United States Military Academy (USMA; Army)
  - United States Naval Academy (USNA)
- Air University
- Army University
- USCGC Eagle (WIX-327), a training ship originally built in Nazi Germany as the Horst Wessel
- United States Coast Guard Auxiliary University Programs, A Coast Guard Auxiliary ran program that does not guarantee a commission.
