= Allen Winbeck =

US Coast Guard admiral

- Born: January 19, 1905; Point Arena, California
- Died: 1990 (aged 84–85) Washington
- Branch: United States Coast Guard
- Service years: 1923–1964
- Conflicts: World War II
- Education: United States Coast Guard Academy

Allen Winbeck (1905–1990) was an American military officer who served as a rear admiral in the United States Coast Guard.

== Early life and education ==
Winbeck was born on January 19, 1905, in Point Arena, California. He was raised in South Bend, Washington and attended the University of Washington.

== Career ==
Winbeck originally enlisted in the Coast Guard in 1923 and was stationed at Coast Guard Station Cape Disappointment. In 1926, he entered the United States Coast Guard Academy. He graduated and received his commission in 1929.

After serving aboard the USCGC Mendota (WHEC-69), Winbeck became an instructor at the academy. In 1941, he was stationed at Naval Station Treasure Island.

During World War II, Winbeck first served aboard the USS Arthur Middleton. After being assigned to Coast Guard District 13, he became executive officer of the USS General H. L. Scott (AP-136), serving in the Pacific Theater of Operations. The following year, he assumed command of the ship.

After the war, Winbeck was stationed in Miami, Florida, before returning to District 13 as Chief of Operations. In 1952 and 1953, he was enrolled at the National War College.

Winbeck became Chief of Personnel of the Coast Guard in 1957, an assignment which also placed him in charge of the United States Coast Guard Reserve. The following year, he was named commanding officer of District 13.

Winbeck retired in 1964, at which time he was awarded the Coast Guard Commendation Medal. After retiring, Winbeck returned to Washington.

== Death ==
Winbeck died in 1990.
