= Secretary of Transportation Outstanding Achievement Medal =

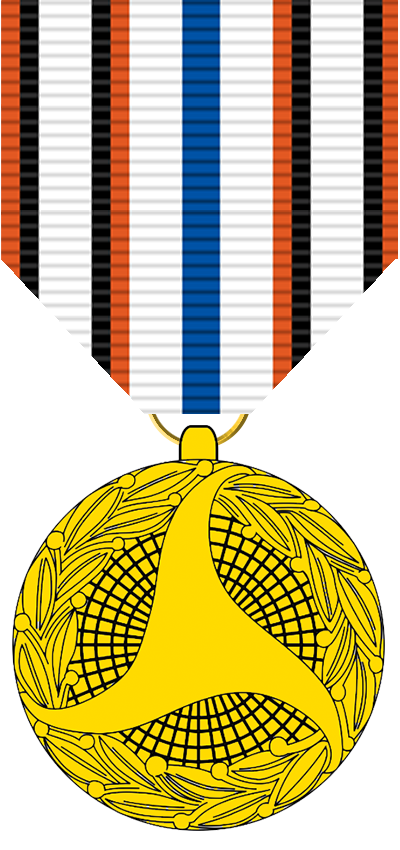
- Ribbon of the award
- Type: Honorary award
- Awarded for: Outstanding leadership and distinguished contributions of major significance
- Country: United States
- Presented by: the United States Department of Transportation
- Eligibility: Department of Transportation civilian employees, formerly to US Coast Guard personnel.
- Ribbon

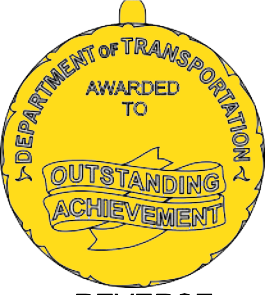
- Reverse

- The related Secretary of Transportation Outstanding Unit Award, a unit level award of the medal

Precedence
- Next (higher): Silver Star
- Next (lower): Defense Superior Service Medal

The Secretary of Transportation Outstanding Achievement Medal also known as the Department of Transportation Gold Medal is the highest honorary award of the United States Department of Transportation.

== Appearance ==
The medal is 1 3/8 inches in diameter, made of gold plated red brass. The obverse depicts a triskelion superimposed over a graticule surrounded by a laurel wreath. The reverse bears the words, in relief, DEPARTMENT OF TRANSPORTATION arched above with the incuse inscription OUTSTANDING ACHIEVEMENT on a scroll below. In the middle are the words AWARDED TO with a space to engrave the recipient's name. The medal is suspended from a ribbon 1 3/8 inches wide made up of a mirrored pattern with a center stripe of old glory blue, a stripe of white with a thin stripes of paprika and black, followed by another stripe of white next to a thin stripe of black with an edge stripe of paprika.

== See also ==
- Awards and decorations of the United States government
