= Robert J. Papp Jr. =

U.S. Coast Guard Commandant

Robert Papp
- Official portrait, 2010

United States Special Representative for the Arctic
- In office 14 July 2014 – 20 January 2017
- President: Barack Obama
- Preceded by: Position established

Commandant of the United States Coast Guard
- In office 25 May 2010 – 30 May 2014
- President: Barack Obama
- Preceded by: Thad Allen
- Succeeded by: Paul Zukunft

Personal details
- Born: 25 March 1953 (age 73) North Kingstown, Rhode Island, U.S.
- Education: United States Coast Guard Academy; Naval War College (MA); Salve Regina University (MS)
- Military career
- Allegiance: United States
- Branch: United States Coast Guard
- Service years: 1975–2014
- Rank: Admiral
- Commands: Commandant of the Coast Guard; Commander, U.S. Coast Guard Atlantic Area; Commander, U.S. Coast Guard 9th District
- Conflicts: Global War on Terrorism; 11 September attacks
- Awards: Homeland Security Distinguished Service Medal; Defense Distinguished Service Medal; Coast Guard Distinguished Service Medal; Legion of Merit; Meritorious Service Medal; Coast Guard Commendation Medal; Coast Guard Achievement Medal

Admiral Robert Joseph Papp Jr. (born 25 March 1953) is a retired admiral of the United States Coast Guard who served as the 24th commandant from 2010 to 2014. He led the largest component of the United States Department of Homeland Security, with 42,000 active duty, 8,200 Reserve, 8,000 civilian, and 31,000 Auxiliary personnel.

== Early life and education ==
Papp is a 1975 graduate of the United States Coast Guard Academy. Additionally, he holds a Master of Arts in National Security and Strategic Studies from the United States Naval War College and a Master of Science in Management from Salve Regina University.

== Career ==
=== U.S. Coast Guard ===
As a flag officer, Papp served as Commander, Coast Guard Atlantic Area, where he was operational commander for all U.S. Coast Guard missions within the eastern half of the world and provided support to the Department of Defense; as the Chief of Staff of the Coast Guard and Commanding Officer of Coast Guard Headquarters; as Commander, Ninth Coast Guard District, with responsibilities for Coast Guard missions on the Great Lakes and Northern Border; and as Director of Reserve and Training where he was responsible for managing and supporting 13,000 Coast Guard Ready Reservists and all Coast Guard Training Centers.

Papp is a cutterman, having served on six Coast Guard cutters and commanded the cutters USCGC Red Beech, USCGC Papaw, USCGC Forward, and USCGC Eagle, the U.S. Coast Guard's training barque. He has also served as commander of a task unit during Operation Able Manner off the coast of Haiti in 1994, enforcing United Nations sanctions. Additionally, his task unit augmented U.S. Naval Forces during an American intervention in Haiti.

Papp's assignments ashore have included the Commandant of Cadets staff at the U.S. Coast Guard Academy; Aids to Navigation staff in the Third Coast Guard District; Chief of the Capabilities Branch in the Defense Operations Division; Chief of the Fleet Development Team; Director of the Leadership Development Center; Chief of the Coast Guard's Office of Congressional Affairs; and Deputy Chief of Staff of the Coast Guard.

==== Commander of the Atlantic Area ====
Until May 2010, Papp served as Commander, Coast Guard Atlantic Area in Portsmouth, Virginia and Commander, Defense Force East. He served as the operational commander for all U.S. Coast Guard missions within the eastern half of the world; ranging from the Rocky Mountains to the Persian Gulf and spanning an area of responsibility across 42 states with over 14 million square miles, and serving with more than 51,000 military and civilian employees and Auxiliarists. In this role, he was also Commander, Defense Force East and provided Coast Guard mission support to the Department of Defense and Combatant Commanders. He assumed those duties in July 2008.

==== Commandant of the U.S. Coast Guard ====
Papp was promoted to admiral and succeeded Admiral Thad Allen as the U.S. Coast Guard's commandant in a change of command ceremony on 25 May 2010. Papp made the first appointment in United States history of a woman to head a United States military service academy when he designated Sandra L. Stosz as superintendent of United States Coast Guard Academy. On 30 May 2014, Papp was succeeded by Admiral Paul F. Zukunft.

==== U.S. Special Representative for the Arctic ====
On 16 July 2014, U.S. Secretary of State John Kerry announced the appointment of retired Admiral Robert Papp to serve as U.S. Special Representative for the Arctic. He retired from this position in January 2017 to become a lobbyist for a shipbuilding company.

== Awards and decorations ==
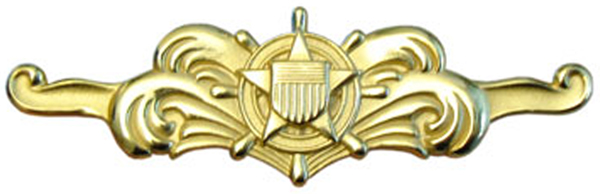

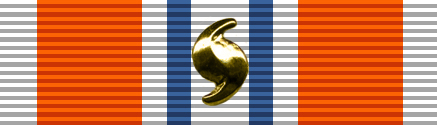

Badge	Cutterman Insignia		
1st row	Homeland Security Distinguished Service Medal	Defense Distinguished Service Medal	
2nd row	Coast Guard Distinguished Service Medal with gold award star	Legion of Merit with three gold award stars	Meritorious Service Medal with gold award star and Operational Distinguishing Device
3rd row	Coast Guard Commendation Medal with three gold award stars and "O" device	Coast Guard Achievement Medal with "O" device	Commandant's Letter of Commendation Ribbon
4th row	Coast Guard Presidential Unit Citation with "hurricane symbol"	Secretary of Transportation Outstanding Unit Award	Coast Guard Unit Commendation with 1 award star and "O" device
5th row	Coast Guard Meritorious Unit Commendation with 4 award stars and "O" device	Navy Meritorious Unit Commendation Ribbon	Meritorious Team Commendation with 2 award stars
6th row	Coast Guard "E" Ribbon	Coast Guard Bicentennial Unit Commendation	National Defense Service Medal with 2 bronze service stars
7th row	Armed Forces Expeditionary Medal	Global War on Terrorism Service Medal	Armed Forces Service Medal
8th row	Humanitarian Service Medal with 1 service star	Transportation 9-11 Ribbon	Special Operations Service Ribbon with 3 service stars
9th row	Sea Service Ribbon with 4 service stars	Order of Naval Merit Admiral Padilla (degree unknown)	Pistol Marksmanship Ribbon with silver sharpshooter device
Badge	Office of the Secretary of Defense Identification Badge		

== Personal life ==
Papp is a native of Norwich, Connecticut. He is married to the former Linda Kapral of East Lyme, Connecticut, the daughter of retired Coast Guard Academy athletic coach Frank Kapral. The couple has three daughters, three granddaughters, and two grandsons.

On 30 July 2005, Papp was inducted into the Reserve Officers Association Minuteman Hall of Fame in recognition of dedicated service to the nation in support of the U.S. Coast Guard Reserve. He was presented the Distinguished Public Service Award of the National Maritime Historical Society in 1998 for his service as the Commanding Officer of the Coast Guard Cutter Eagle. In 2005 he was presented with the "Native Sons Award" by his home town of Norwich, Connecticut.

Papp is the 13th Gold Ancient Mariner of the Coast Guard, which is an honorary position held by an officer, with the earliest date of qualification as a Cutterman and over ten years of cumulative sea duty. Papp accepted the 2010 Naval War College Distinguished Graduate Leadership Award from the Naval War College (NWC) during a ceremony held at the Washington Navy Yard on 6 May 2010. In a cover story interview published in the February 2012 issue of Military Officer, he described his plans for budgetary reductions in the U.S. Coast Guard. Additionally, Admiral Papp was presented with the Dwight D. Eisenhower award in 2013.

== See also ==
- Organization of the United States Coast Guard

Military offices
Preceded by Thad Allen	Commandant of the Coast Guard; 2010–2014	Succeeded by Paul Zukunft
Diplomatic posts
New office	United States Special Representative for the Arctic; 2014–2017	Incumbent
