= Karl L. Schultz =

US Coast Guard admiral

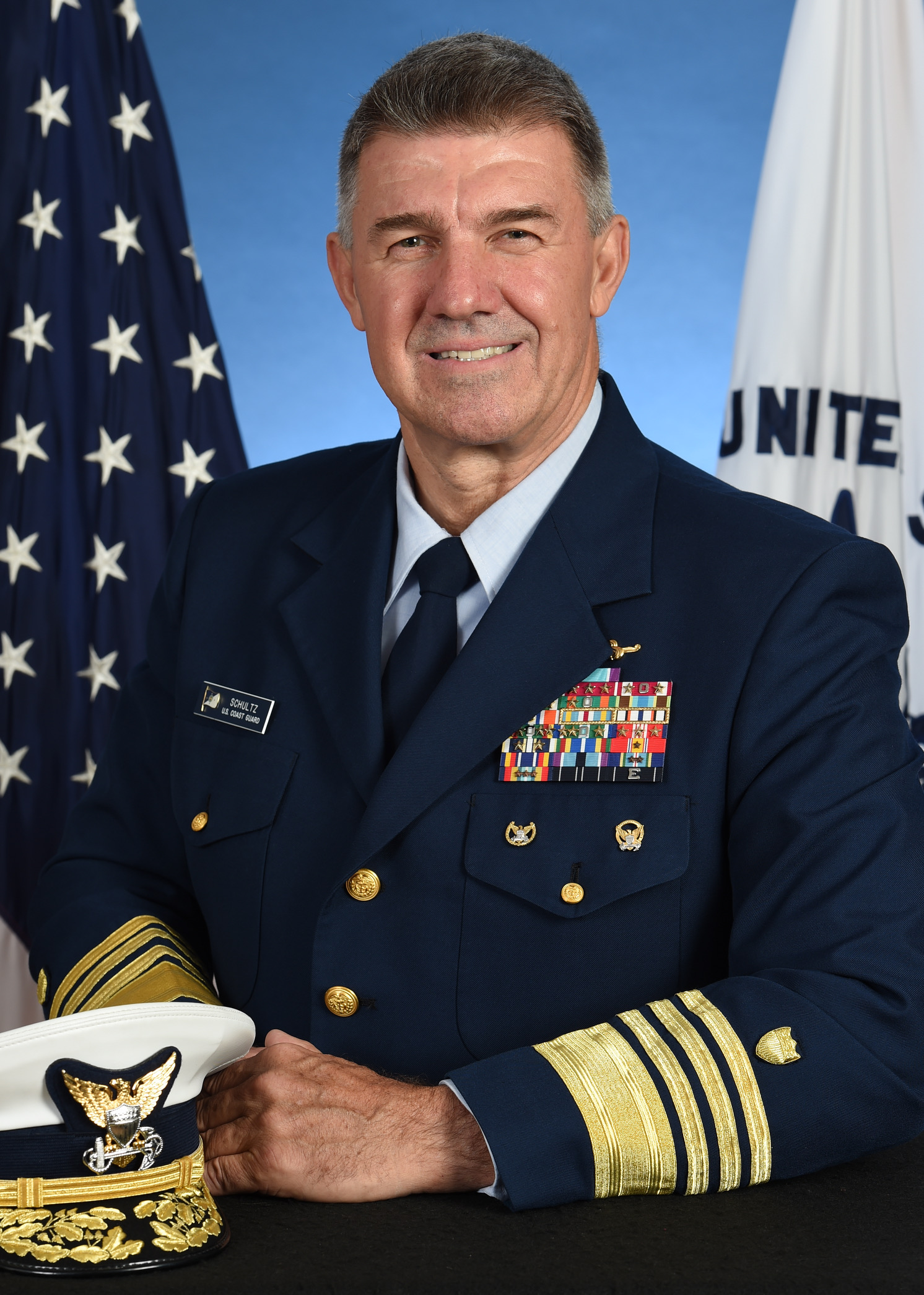
- Official portrait, 2018

26th Commandant of the Coast Guard
- In office June 1, 2018 – June 1, 2022
- President: Donald Trump; Joe Biden
- Deputy: Charles W. Ray; Linda L. Fagan; Steven D. Poulin
- Preceded by: Paul F. Zukunft
- Succeeded by: Linda L. Fagan

Personal details
- Education: United States Coast Guard Academy (BS); University of Connecticut (MPA)

Military service
- Allegiance: United States
- Branch/service: United States Coast Guard
- Years of service: 1983–2022
- Rank: Admiral
- Commands: Commandant of the Coast Guard; Coast Guard Atlantic Area; Coast Guard Defense Force East; Eleventh Coast Guard District; Coast Guard Sector Miami; USCGC Venturous; USCGC Acacia; USCGC Farallon
- Battles/wars: Global War on Terrorism • September 11 attacks
- Awards: Homeland Security Distinguished Service Medal; Coast Guard Distinguished Service Medal; Defense Superior Service Medal; Legion of Merit (4); Meritorious Service Medal (3); Coast Guard Commendation Medal (4); Coast Guard Achievement Medal (2)

Karl Leo Schultz is a retired United States Coast Guard admiral who served as the 26th commandant of the Coast Guard from 2018 to 2022.

== Early life and education ==
Schultz is a native of East Hartford, Connecticut. He graduated from the United States Coast Guard Academy in 1983 with a Bachelor of Science degree in civil engineering. He then earned a Master of Public Administration from the University of Connecticut in 1992 and completed a one-year National Security Fellowship at the Kennedy School of Government in 2006.

== Career ==
=== United States Coast Guard ===
Schultz's operational assignments include Commander, Coast Guard Sector Miami as well as command tours aboard cutters Venturous, Acacia, and Farallon. Staff assignments include Chief of the Office of Congressional and Governmental Affairs; Congressional Liaison Officer to the United States House of Representatives; Liaison Officer to the United States Department of State, Bureau of International Narcotics and Law Enforcement Affairs; Assignment Officer at the Coast Guard Personnel Command, and Command Duty Officer in the Seventh Coast Guard District Operations Center in Miami.

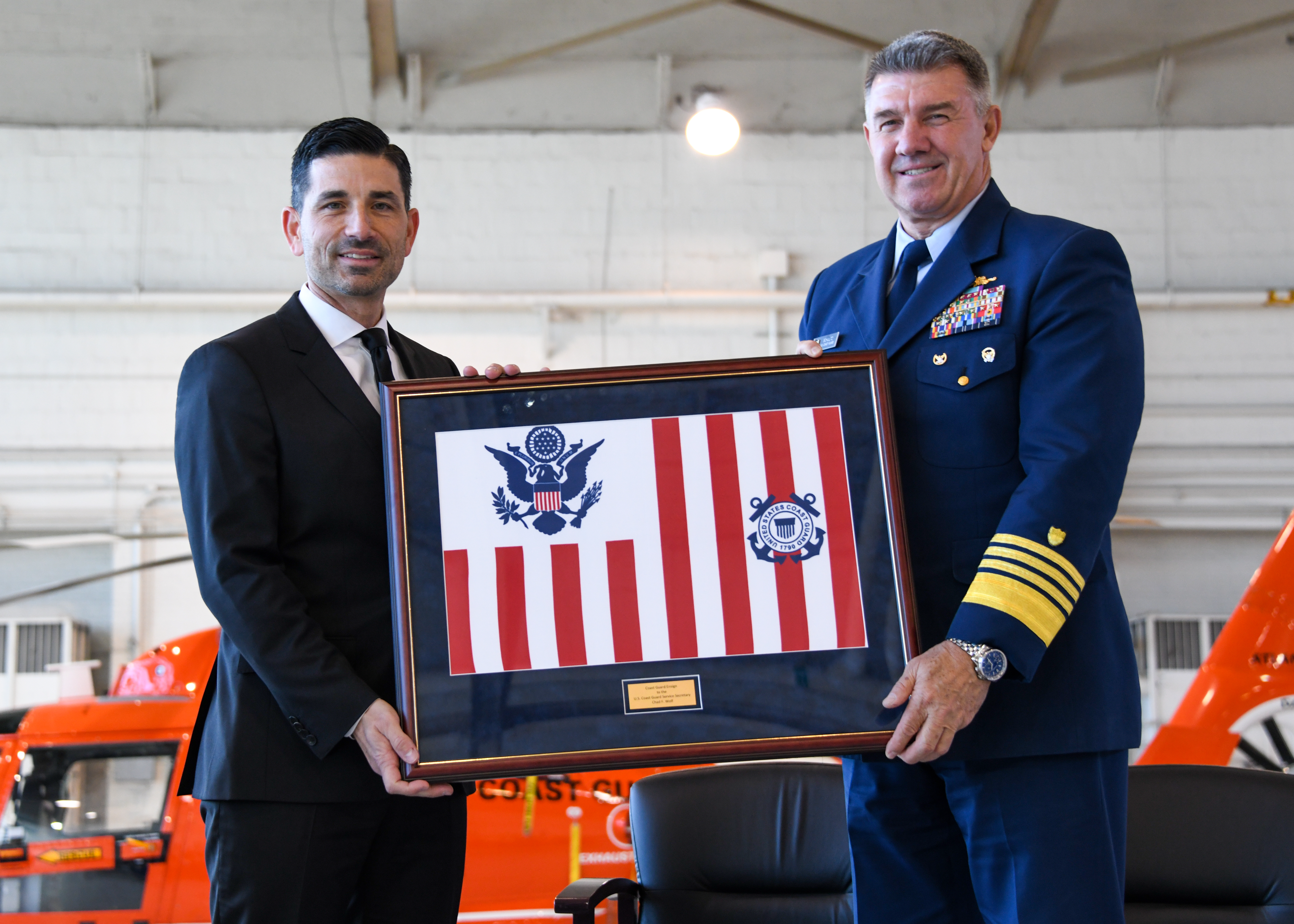
Schultz poses with Acting Homeland Security Secretary Chad Wolf being recognized as the Coast Guard’s Service Secretary during a ceremony at Coast Guard Air Station Washington, D.C.

Schultz has served as Director of Operations (J3), United States Southern Command in Doral, Florida where he directed joint service military operations across the Caribbean Basin, Central and South America. Prior flag officer assignments were Commander, Eleventh Coast Guard District, where he was responsible for multi-mission operations from California to Peru, and Director of Governmental and Public Affairs at Coast Guard Headquarters in Washington, D.C., where he was responsible for external engagement with Congress, the media, and inter-governmental entities.

Schultz assumed the duties as Commander, Coast Guard Atlantic Area in August 2016. As commander, Schultz oversaw Coast Guard rescue and recovery efforts for hurricanes Harvey, Irma, Maria, and Nate in 2017.

=== Commandant of the Coast Guard ===
On March 8, 2018, Homeland Security Secretary Kirstjen Nielsen announced that President Donald Trump intended to nominate Schultz for the position of Commandant of the United States Coast Guard, succeeding Admiral Paul F. Zukunft. His nomination and promotion to admiral was confirmed by a voice vote of the United States Senate on May 9, 2018. Schultz relieved Zukunft on June 1, 2018.

In June 2018, the House of Representatives launched an 18-month investigation into the culture of the Coast Guard, stemming from whistleblowers who alleged sexual assault, racism, bullying, and retaliation. At the conclusion of the two committee joint inquiry, called Righting The Ship, Congress concluded that the Coast Guard top brass had bullied and retaliated against an active duty female professor at the Coast Guard Academy.

On December 12, 2019, in an unprecedented move, Schultz refused to appear before Congress at the Righting The Ship hearing to answer questions about the culture of abuse and cover up. Several media outlets and members of Congress in the House and Senate communicated their frustration about the culture of the Coast Guard set by leaders at the top.

After a CNN investigative reporting into a sexual assault scandal dubbed Operation Fouled Anchor, it was revealed in an overlapping timeline as the Righting Ship inquiry, that Schultz also failed to act on plans to share the findings with Congress, the Department of Homeland Security, and the public of an investigation into rape and sexual assault in the Coast Guard Academy. His tenure as commandant ended on June 1, 2022, and he retired later that day. His attendance at the 40th year reunion for the Coast Guard Academy Class of 1983 in the wake of the cover-up was concerning to some attendees. After listening to four women describe being sexually assaulted as U.S. Coast Guard Academy cadets, members of the United States Senate Homeland Security Permanent Subcommittee on Investigations probing a "culture of cover-up" vowed to hold past and current Coast Guard leadership accountable. "We're going to pursue those two individuals and others," said Sen. Richard Blumenthal, D-Conn., chairman of the Subcommittee, referring to retired Admiral Karl L. Schultz, the former commandant of the Coast Guard, and his successor, the then-current commandant, Admiral Linda Fagan.

On 25 July 2024, the House Committee on Oversight and Accountability investigating the Coast Guard’s mishandling of serious misconduct, including racism, hazing, discrimination, sexual harassment, sexual assault, and the failure to disclose internal investigations into those issues to Congress requested that Admiral Schultz participate in a voluntary transcribed interview. The Committee stated that "[o]ne of the key questions the Committee is examining is the extent to which senior USCG leadership willfully concealed internal reports from Congress that would have informed policy changes needed to combat, and further prevent, future incidents of misconduct. As the Commandant of the Coast Guard during the finalization of [Operation Fouled Anchor], the Committee is interested in learning more about what actions you took to notify Congress or conceal misconduct. We believe that as the former Commandant of the U.S. Coast Guard, you have information that will assist us in fully understanding the extent to which USCG withheld these reports from Congress, how these incidents of misconduct were handled, and what actions USCG took regarding those responsible. We therefore request that you make yourself available voluntarily for a transcribed interview."

== Awards and decorations ==
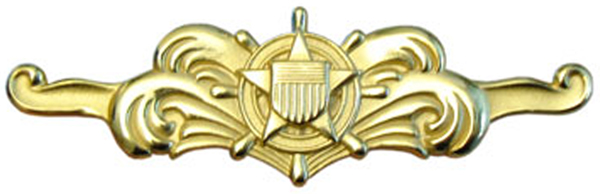

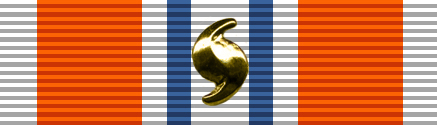

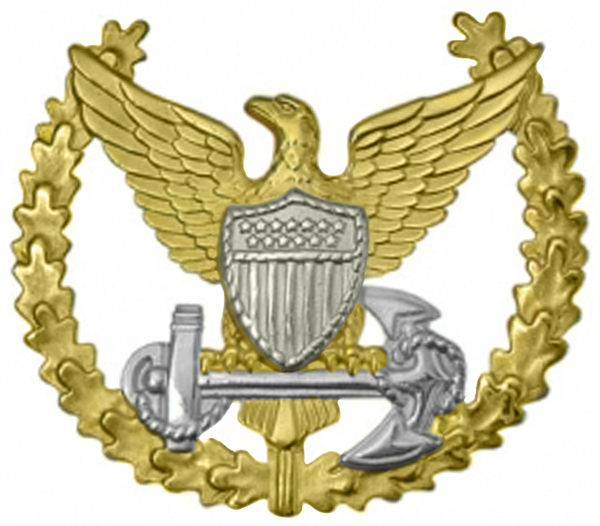

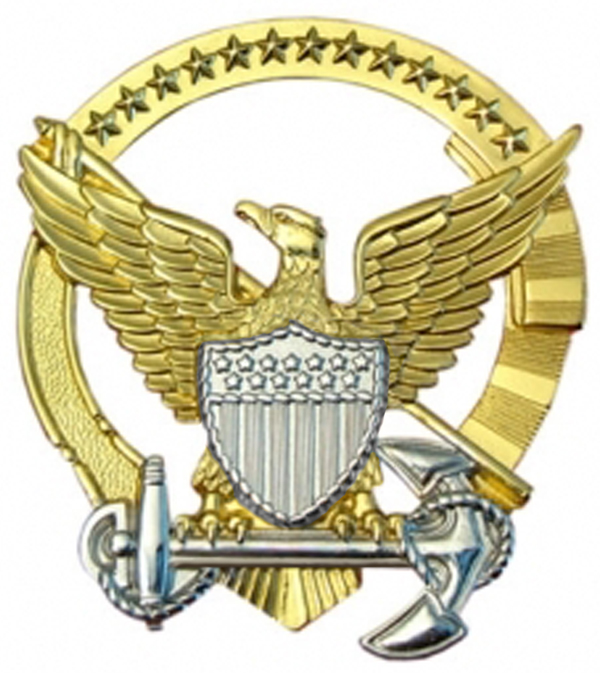

Insignias	Cutterman Officer Insignia		
1st row	Homeland Security Distinguished Service Medal	Coast Guard Distinguished Service Medal	Defense Superior Service Medal
2nd row	Legion of Merit with three gold award stars	Meritorious Service Medal with two award stars and "O" device	Coast Guard Commendation Medal with three award stars and "O" device
3rd row	Coast Guard Achievement Medal with award star and "O" device	Commandant's Letter of Commendation Ribbon	Coast Guard Presidential Unit Citation with "hurricane symbol"
4th row	Joint Meritorious Unit Award	Department of Homeland Security Outstanding Unit Award	Secretary of Transportation Outstanding Unit Award
5th row	Coast Guard Unit Commendation with four award stars and "O" device	Coast Guard Meritorious Unit Commendation with three award stars and "O" device	Meritorious Team Commendation with three award stars
6th row	Coast Guard "E" Ribbon with three award stars	Coast Guard Bicentennial Unit Commendation	National Defense Service Medal with one bronze service star
7th row	Global War on Terrorism Service Medal	Humanitarian Service Medal with two service stars	Special Operations Service Ribbon with two service stars
8th row	Sea Service Ribbon with three service stars	Rifle Marksmanship Ribbon	Pistol Marksmanship Medal with expert device
Devices	Command Ashore Device		Command Afloat Device

Military offices
Preceded by Daniel B. Abel	Director of Operations of the United States Southern Command; 2015-2018	Succeeded by Steven D. Poulin
Preceded by William D. Lee	Commander of the Coast Guard Atlantic Area; 2016-2018	Succeeded by Scott A. Buschman
Preceded by William D. Lee	Director of the Homeland Security Joint Task Force - East; 2016-2018	Succeeded by Scott A. Buschman
Preceded by Paul F. Zukunft	Commandant of the Coast Guard; 2018–2022	Succeeded by Linda L. Fagan
