= Thad Allen =

United States Coast Guard admiral (born 1949)

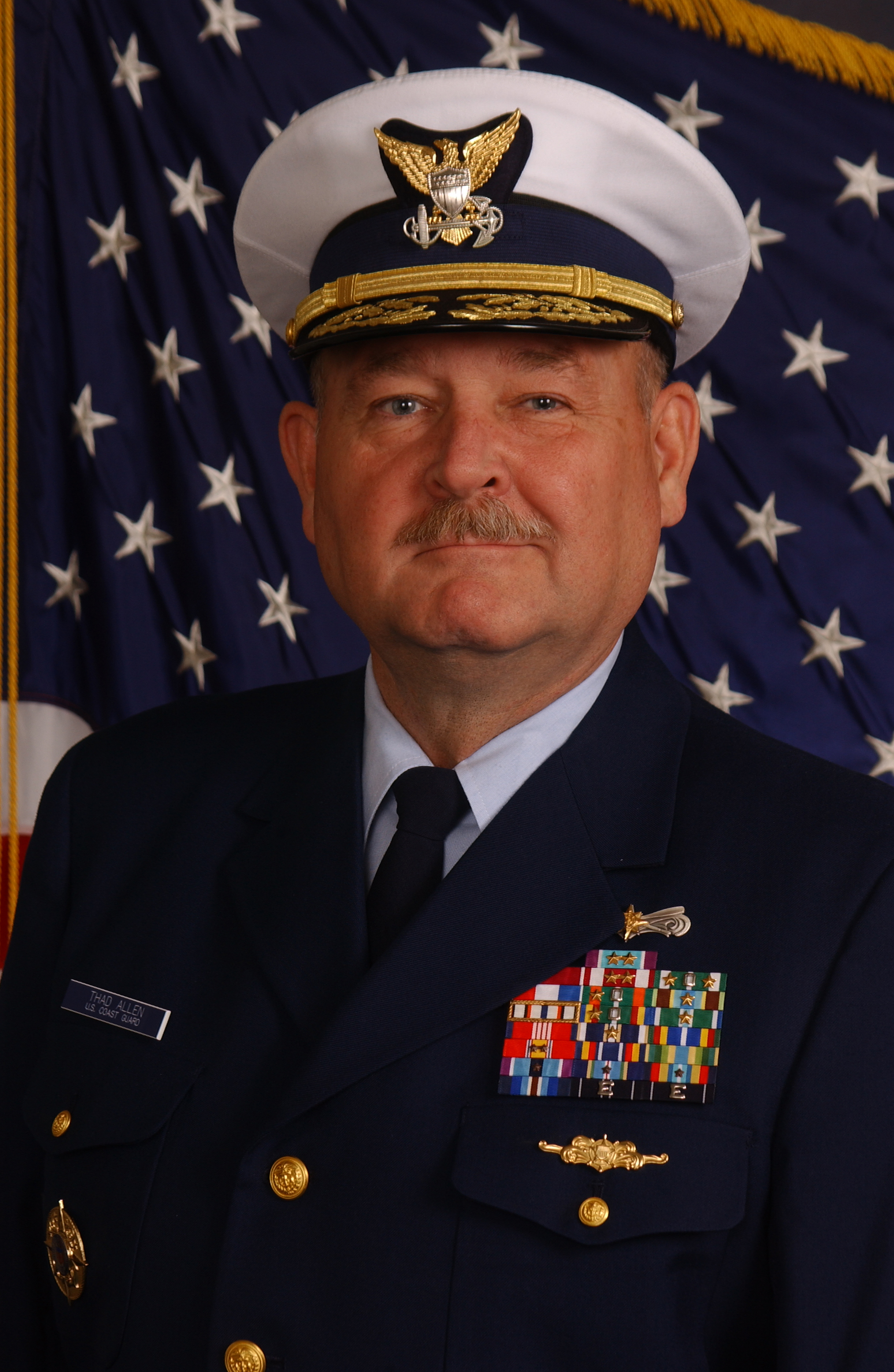
- Official portrait, 2006

Commandant of the United States Coast Guard
- In office 25 May 2006 – 25 May 2010
- President: George W. Bush; Barack Obama
- Preceded by: Thomas H. Collins
- Succeeded by: Robert Papp

Personal details
- Born: Thad William Allen; 16 January 1949 (age 77) Los Angeles, California, U.S.
- Spouse: Pamela Hess
- Education: United States Coast Guard Academy; George Washington University (MPA); Massachusetts Institute of Technology (MA)
- Awards: Homeland Security Distinguished Service Medal (2); Defense Distinguished Service Medal; Coast Guard Distinguished Service Medal (3); Legion of Merit; Meritorious Service Medal (3)

Military service
- Allegiance: United States
- Branch/service: United States Coast Guard
- Years of service: 1971–2010
- Rank: Admiral
- Commands: Commandant of the Coast Guard; Deepwater Horizon Unified Command
- Battles/wars: September 11 attacks Deepwater Horizon oil spill

Thad William Allen (born 16 January 1949) is a former admiral of the United States Coast Guard who served as the 23rd commandant from 2006 to 2010. Allen is best known for his performance directing the federal response to hurricanes Katrina and Rita in the Gulf Coast region from September 2005 to January 2006, and for his role as National Incident Commander of the Unified Command for the Deepwater Horizon oil spill in the Gulf of Mexico in 2010. Robert J. Papp Jr. succeeded him as Commandant on 25 May 2010.

Allen remained on active duty for 36 days after being succeeded as commandant while serving as Deepwater Horizon National Incident Commander. He officially retired from the U.S. Coast Guard on 30 June 2010, but continued to serve as National Incident Commander for an additional three months. He has worked as an executive vice president at Booz Allen Hamilton since November 2011.

== Early life and education ==
Allen was born in Los Angeles, California, the son of retired U.S. Coast Guard chief damage controlman and World War II veteran Clyde and Mrs. Wilma Allen. Allen is a 1967 graduate of Palo Verde High School in Tucson. His family moved frequently during his childhood with his father's assignments. He attended the United States Coast Guard Academy in New London, Connecticut, where he was a standout football player, graduating in 1971. He holds a Master of Public Administration degree from George Washington University and a Master's degree in Management (S.M.) from the MIT Sloan School of Management as a Sloan Fellow.

== Career ==
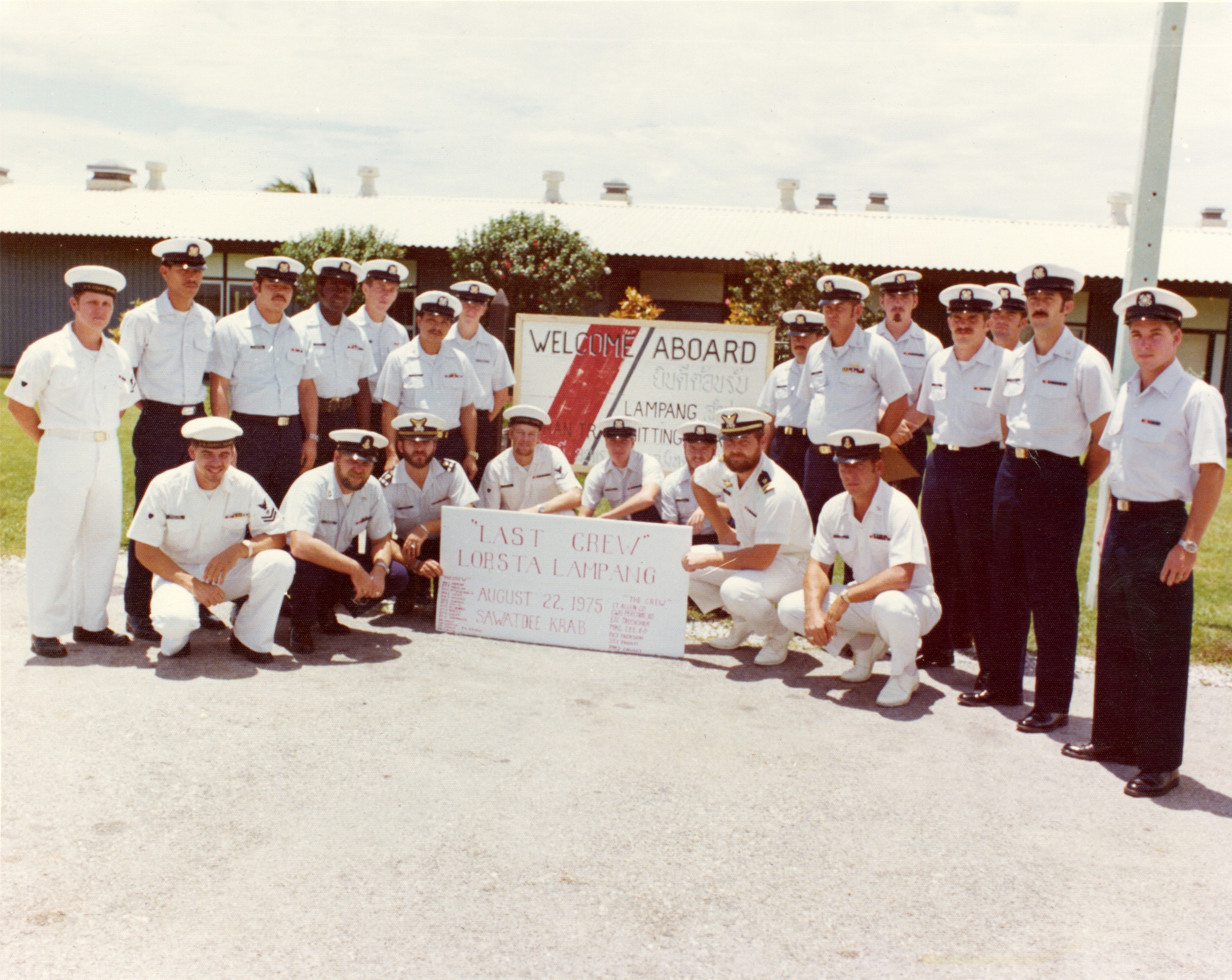
Allen and his crewmen in August 1975 (front row, second from the right).

=== United States Coast Guard ===
In his four decades of service, Allen has held operational command both at sea and ashore, conducting missions to support the maritime safety, security and environmental stewardship interests of the nation. Allen was the last commanding officer of LORAN Station Lampang, Thailand, serving there from 1974 to 1975. Station Lampang was part of the LORAN chain first put into use in 1966 as part of "Operation Tight Reign" in support of military operations in the Vietnam War. He served aboard USCGC Androscoggin (WHEC-68), and USCGC Gallatin (WHEC-721) and commanded USCGC Citrus (WLB-300). He performed dual roles as commanding officer of Group Long Island Sound and Captain of the Port, and he commanded Group Atlantic City. He also commanded the Seventh Coast Guard District in Miami and the Atlantic Area in Portsmouth, Virginia.

==== Flag officer ====
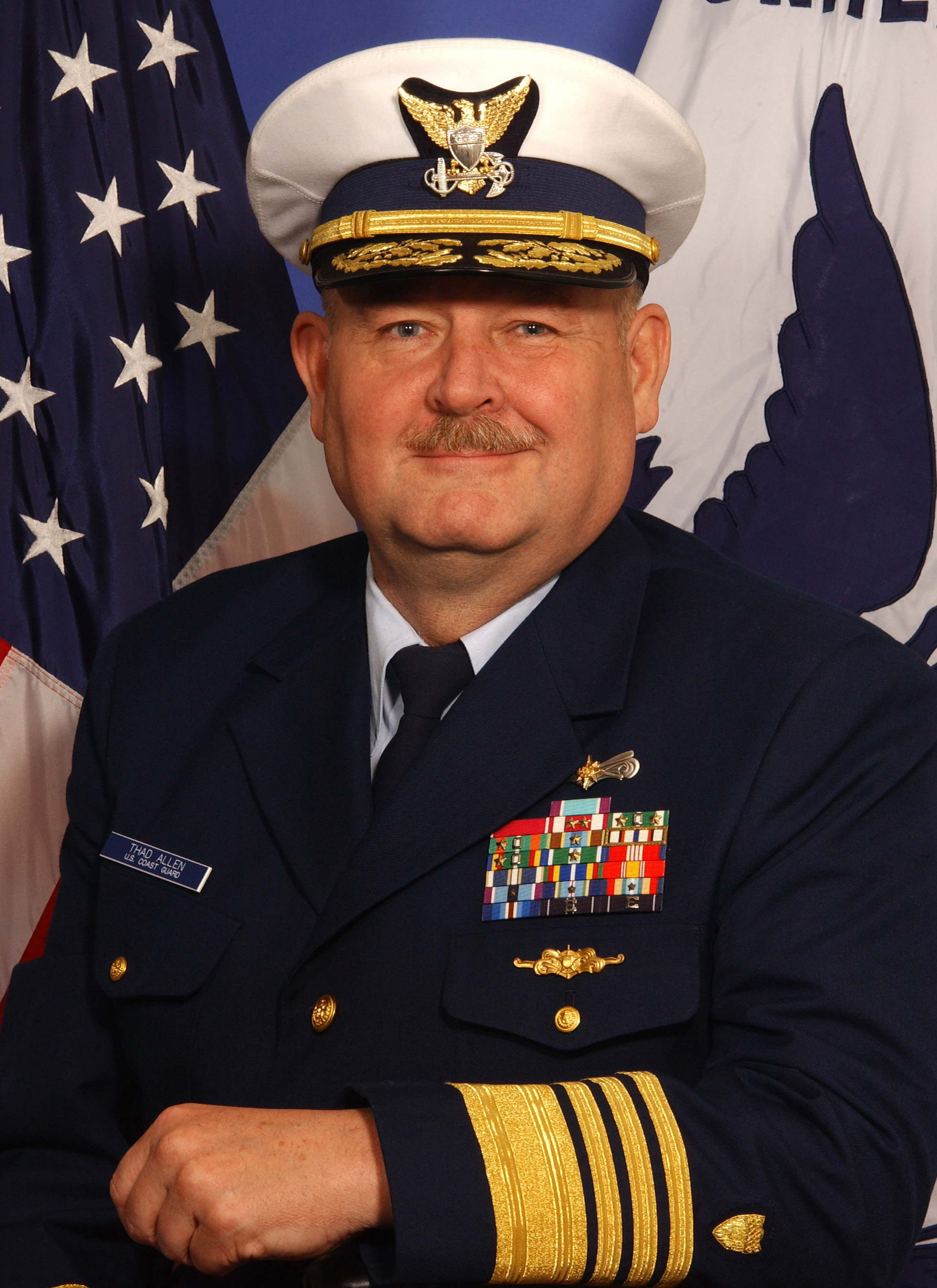
Portrait of Admiral Thad Allen as he assumed the office of commandant of the Coast Guard, May 2006.

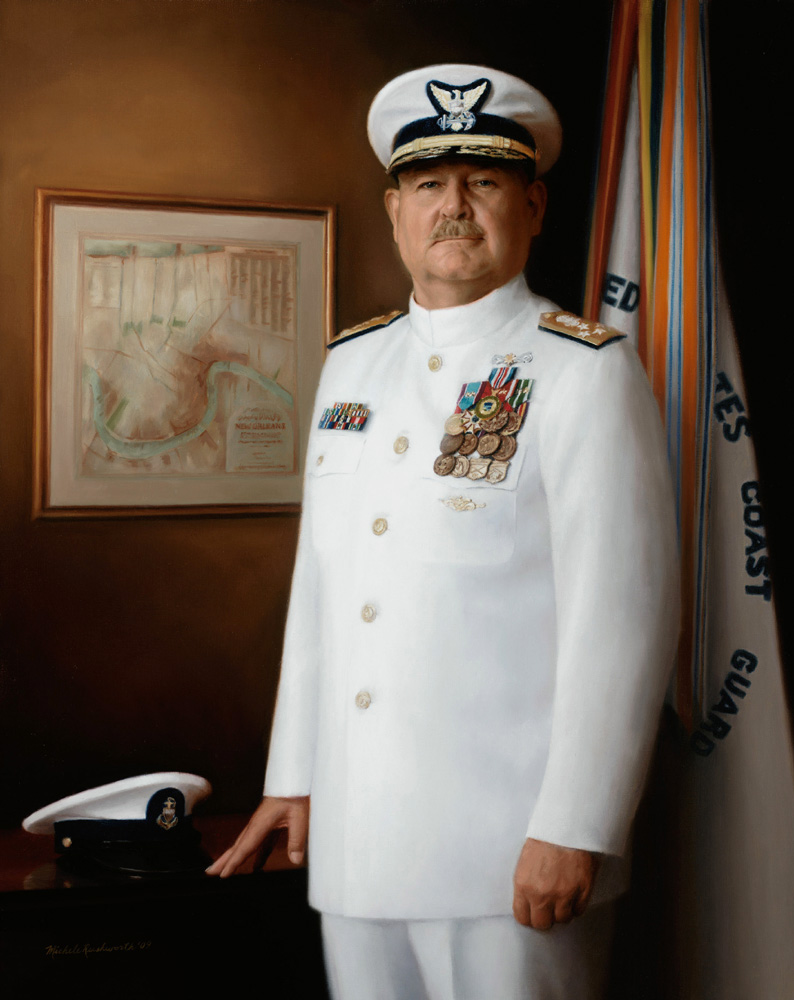
An official U.S. Coast Guard portrait painting of Allen by Michele Rushworth.

Allen's first assignment as a flag officer was as Director of Resources at Coast Guard Headquarters then Commander, Seventh Coast Guard District, where he directed all operations in the Southeastern United States and Caribbean. Following that assignment he served as Commander, Atlantic Area and U.S. Maritime Defense Zone Atlantic. In this capacity he oversaw all Coast Guard operations on the U.S. East Coast, Gulf Coast, and Great Lakes in the aftermath of the September 11 attacks. Allen served as the U.S. Coast Guard's Chief of Staff from May 2002 until May 2006. As Chief of Staff, Allen was third in the Coast Guard's command structure, and was commanding officer of Coast Guard Headquarters in Washington, D.C.

==== Hurricane Katrina ====
On 5 September 2005, while serving as Coast Guard Chief of Staff, Allen was appointed deputy to Federal Emergency Management Agency Director Michael D. Brown by Homeland Security Secretary Michael Chertoff, and placed in charge of Hurricane Katrina search-and-rescue and recovery efforts. Former colleagues interviewed after the announcement praised Allen as well-suited to the task.

On 9 September 2005, Allen was given full command of the Bush administration's Hurricane Katrina onsite relief efforts. Secretary of Homeland Security Michael Chertoff elevated Allen following the removal of Federal Emergency Management Agency Director Michael D. Brown from that position. Allen announced on 25 January that he would be relieved of this responsibility on 27 January 2006.

==== Commandant of the U.S. Coast Guard ====
Allen assumed the duties of the 23rd Commandant of the U.S. Coast Guard on 25 May 2006. He was appointed to a four-year term by President George W. Bush and confirmed by the Senate. Admiral Robert J. Papp Jr. succeeded him as commandant on 25 May 2010, in a change of command ceremony.

==== Deepwater Horizon oil spill ====
On 30 April 2010, Homeland Security Secretary Janet Napolitano announced that Allen would serve as the National Incident Commander for the federal government's response to the Deepwater Horizon oil spill in the Gulf of Mexico. After the end of his service as commandant on 25 May 2010, Allen continued serving as National Incident Commander until 1 October 2010, when that billet was disestablished. He also remained on active duty in the Coast Guard until 30 June 2010, which was the first time in history the Coast Guard had two active duty four-star admirals. The position of Vice Commandant of the Coast Guard has since been made a four-star rank.

==== Operation Fouled Anchor (OFA) Investigation ====
Because Admiral Allen served as Chief of Staff for the Coast Guard from May 2002 to May 2006 the House Committee on Oversight and Accountability investigating the Coast Guard’s mishandling of serious misconduct requested that Allen participate in a voluntary transcribed interview. The Committee stated that "[o]ne of the key questions the Committee is examining is the extent to which senior USCG leadership willfully concealed internal reports from Congress that would have informed policy changes needed to combat, and further prevent, future incidents of misconduct. Additionally, as the Chief of Staff during and the Commandant following the date range investigated by OFA, the Committee is interested in learning more about what efforts were made to notify Congress or conceal misconduct. We believe that as the former Commandant and Chief of Staff of the U.S. Coast Guard, you have information that will assist us in fully understanding the extent to which USCG withheld these reports from Congress, how these incidents of misconduct were handled, and what actions USCG took regarding those responsible. We therefore request that you make yourself available voluntarily for a transcribed interview."

=== RAND Corporation and Booz Allen Hamilton ===
In October 2010, Allen joined the RAND Corporation as a senior fellow. On 28 November 2011, Booz Allen Hamilton named Allen a Senior Vice President, joining the firm's Justice and Homeland Security business and leading development of thought leadership and client engagement regarding the direction of law enforcement and homeland security.

== Personal life ==
Allen resides in Vienna, Virginia, with his wife Pamela A. Hess, whom he married in October 1975. They have three children and five grandchildren. He was elected a National Academy of Public Administration Fellow in 2003.

Allen's civilian awards include the 2006 Strategic Vision Award by the Global Strategy Institute (GSI) of the Center for Strategic and International Studies (CSIS). In 2009, he was awarded the Admiral Of The Ocean Sea Award (AOTOS) from the United Seaman's Service and the 2009 Business Achievement Award given by Beta Gamma Sigma, the academic honor society affiliated with the Association to Advance Collegiate Schools of Business. He was nominated for this award by the United States Coast Guard Academy. Allen, in May 2013, also received an honorary doctorate in public service from the George Washington University.

Allen is a member of the Homeland Security Advisory Council.

His official U.S. Coast Guard portrait, painted by artist Michele Rushworth was unveiled at Fort Lesley J. McNair upon his retirement. Allen is a member of the Coast Guard Academy Board of Trustees. He was also the director of the bureaucratic transition of the Coast Guard from the Department of Transportation to the Department of Homeland Security.

== Awards and decorations ==
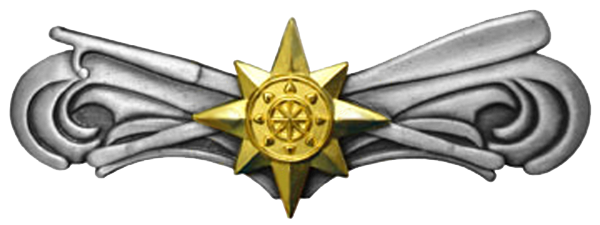

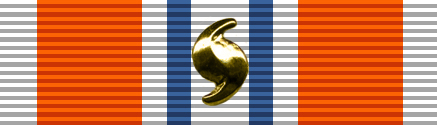

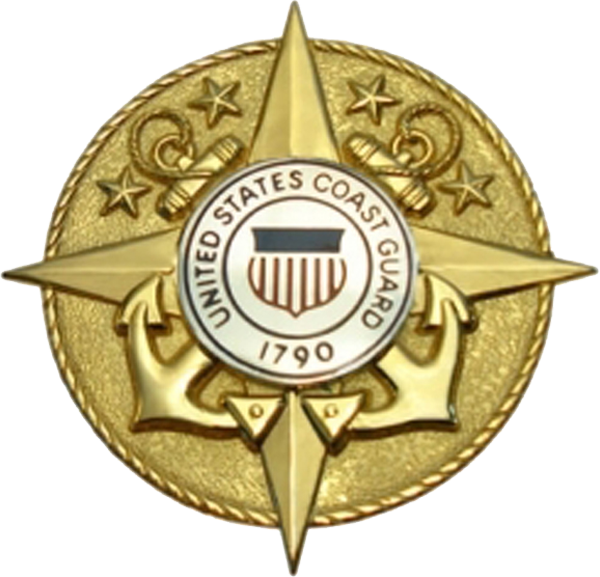
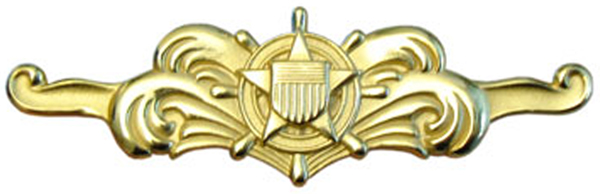

Badge	Advanced Boat Force Operations Insignia		
1st Row		Homeland Security Distinguished Service Medal with gold award star	
2nd Row	Defense Distinguished Service Medal	Coast Guard Distinguished Service Medal with 2 gold award stars	Legion of Merit
3rd Row	Meritorious Service Medal with 2 gold award stars	Coast Guard Commendation Medal with 2 gold award stars and Operational Distinguishing Device	Transportation 9-11 Medal
4th Row	Coast Guard Achievement Medal with gold award star and "O" device	Commandant's Letter of Commendation Ribbon with 1 award star	Coast Guard Presidential Unit Citation with "hurricane symbol"
5th Row	Secretary of Transportation Outstanding Unit Award	Coast Guard Unit Commendation with 1 award star and "O" device	Coast Guard Meritorious Unit Commendation with 1 award star
6th Row	Meritorious Team Commendation	Coast Guard "E" Ribbon with 1 award star	Coast Guard Bicentennial Unit Commendation
7th Row	National Defense Service Medal with 2 bronze service stars	Global War on Terrorism Service Medal	Armed Forces Service Medal
8th Row	Humanitarian Service Medal with 1 service star	Special Operations Service Ribbon with 1 service star	Sea Service Ribbon with 1 service star
9th Row	Restricted Duty Ribbon	Expert Rifle Marksmanship Medal	Expert Pistol Marksmanship Medal
Badges	Commandant Staff Badge	Cutterman Insignia	

== References used ==
- Portions of this biography were taken from the Coast Guard's official biography https://www.history.uscg.mil/Browse-by-Topic/Notable-People/All/Article/1762857/admiral-thad-w-allen/
- Johnson, Robert Irwin (1987). Guardians of the Sea, History of the United States Coast Guard, 1915 to the Present. Naval Institute Press, Annapolis, Maryland. ISBN 978-0-87021-720-3.

Military offices
Preceded by Thomas Collins	Commandant of the Coast Guard; 2006–2010	Succeeded by Robert Papp
