= Paul F. Zukunft =

US Coast Guard Admiral

Paul Zukunft
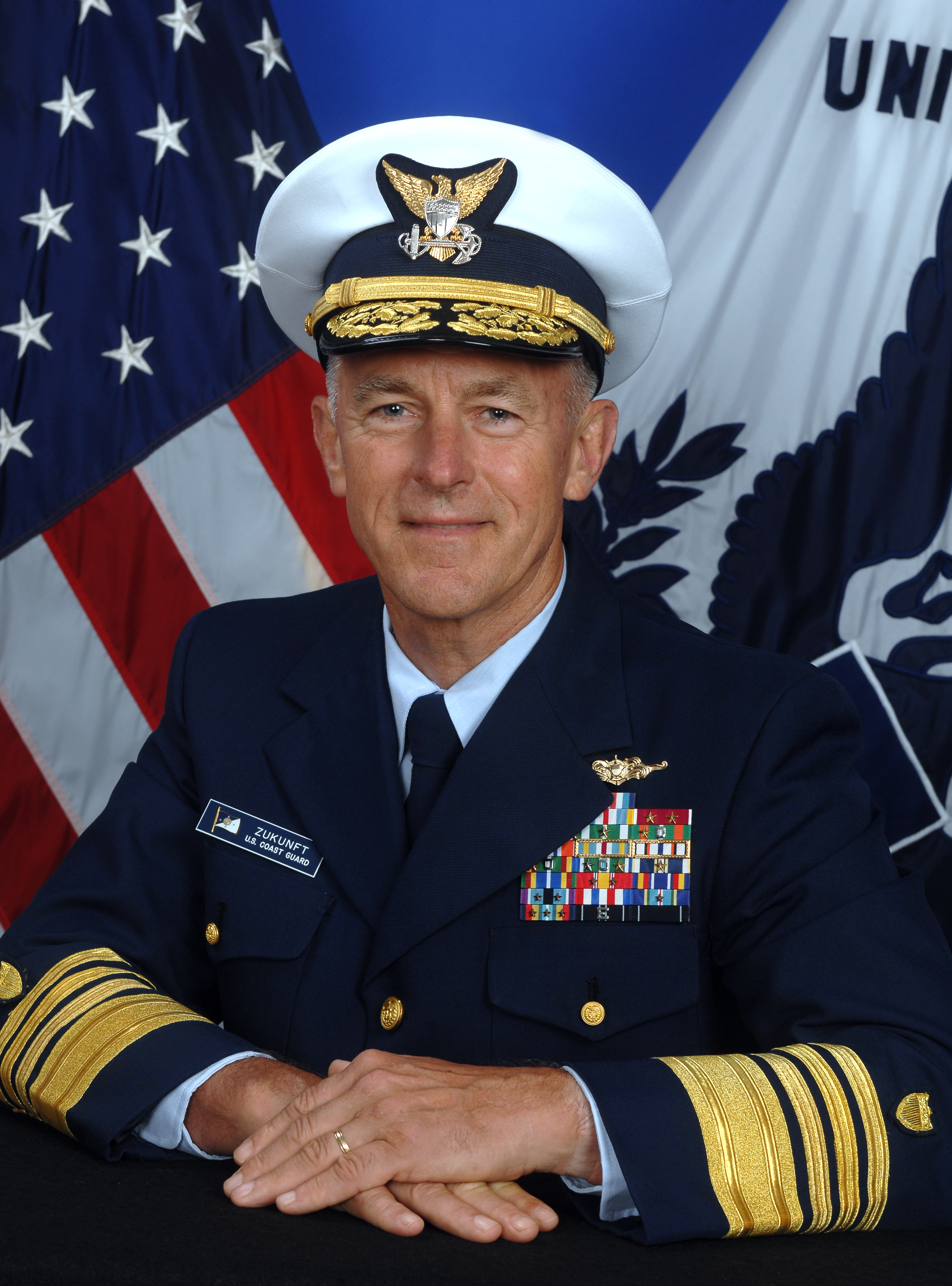
- Official portrait, 2014

25th Commandant of the Coast Guard
- In office 30 May 2014 – 1 June 2018
- President: Barack Obama; Donald Trump
- Deputy: Peter V. Neffenger; Charles D. Michel; Charles W. Ray
- Preceded by: Robert J. Papp Jr.
- Succeeded by: Karl L. Schultz

Personal details
- Born: 30 January 1955 (age 71) New Haven, Connecticut, U.S.
- Education: U.S. Coast Guard Academy (BS); Webster University (MA); Naval War College (MA)

Military service
- Allegiance: United States
- Branch/service: United States Coast Guard
- Years of service: 1977–2018
- Rank: Admiral
- Commands: Commandant of the Coast Guard; Coast Guard Pacific Area; Eleventh Coast Guard District; Joint Interagency Task Force West; USCGC Rush; USCGC Harriet Lane; USCGC Cape Upright
- Battles/wars: Global War on Terrorism: September 11 attacks
- Awards: Cutterman Insignia; Homeland Security Distinguished Service Medal (2); Coast Guard Distinguished Service Medal; Defense Superior Service Medal; Legion of Merit; Meritorious Service Medal; Coast Guard Commendation Medal; Coast Guard Achievement Medal

Paul Frederick Zukunft (born 30 January 1955) is a retired admiral of the United States Coast Guard who served as the 25th commandant. He was confirmed by the U.S. Senate as the commandant, with the rank of admiral, in May 2014 and relieved Robert J. Papp Jr. as commandant on 30 May 2014. Prior to his selection as commandant, he served as commander, Coast Guard Pacific Area. In this position, Zukunft was the operational commander for all U.S. Coast Guard missions within the half of the world that ranges from the Rocky Mountains to the waters off the East Coast of Africa. He concurrently served as commander, Defense Force West and provided U.S. Coast Guard mission support to the U.S. Department of Defense and combatant commanders.

Previous flag assignments include the assistant commandant for marine safety, security and stewardship; director of response policy, assistant commandant for capability; commander, Eleventh Coast Guard District; and director, Joint Interagency Task Force West; Federal Onscene Deepwater Horizon Unified Command, and the commander of the U.S. Coast Guard Pacific Area.

Zukunft wears the permanent Cutterman Insignia and is a certified NIMS ICS Type I incident commander. His personal awards include the Department of Homeland Security Distinguished Service Medal, Coast Guard Distinguished Service Medal, Defense Superior Service Medal, three Legion of Merit, and five Meritorious Service Medals with "O" device among others.

== Early life and education ==
Zukunft was born on 30 January 1955 in New Haven and is a native of North Branford, Connecticut. He graduated from the United States Coast Guard Academy in 1977 with a Bachelor of Science degree in government. He attended Webster University in 1988, where he received his Master of Arts degree in management, and the U.S. Naval War College in 1997 graduating with a Master of Arts degree in national security and strategic studies. He is a graduate of the Asia Pacific Center for Security Studies Executive Seminar and Harvard's Kennedy School of Government National Preparedness Leadership Initiative course.

== Career ==
=== U.S. Coast Guard ===
Zukunft was promoted to flag rank in 2006. His six previous flag assignments also include the assistant commandant for marine safety, security and stewardship; director of response policy, assistant commandant for capability; commander, Eleventh Coast Guard District and director, Joint Interagency Task Force West. Additionally, Zukunft served as the federal on-scene coordinator for the Deepwater Horizon Spill of National Significance in 2010, and directed more than 47,000 responders, 6,500 vessels and 120 aircraft during one of the largest oil spills in U.S. history.

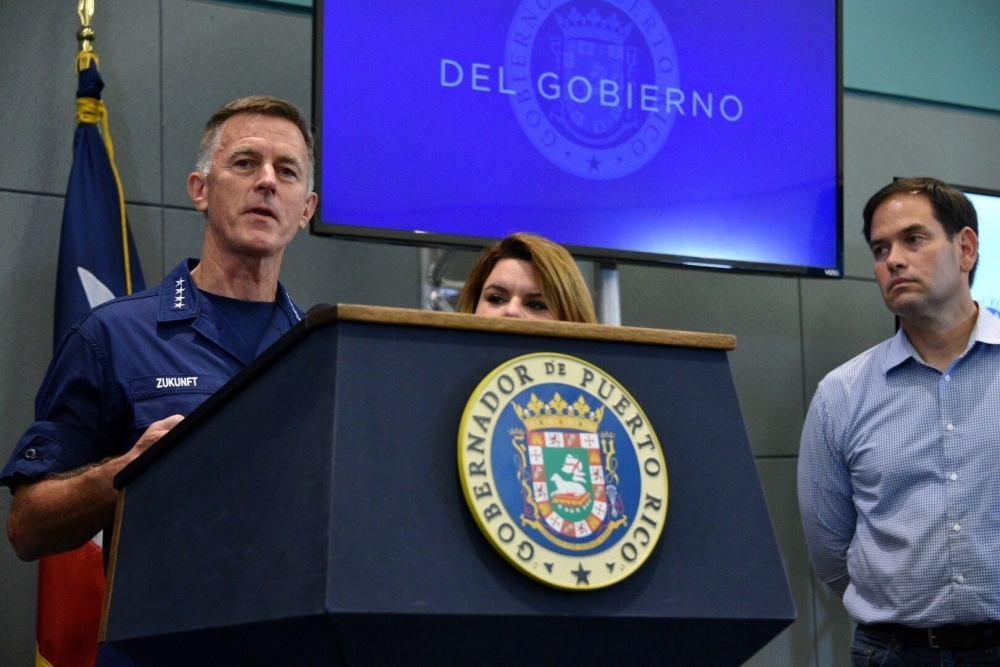
Zukunft addresses the media during a press conference at the emergency operations center in San Juan, Puerto Rico, on September 25, 2017.

Zukunft has served at sea, commanding USCGC Rush, USCGC Harriet Lane, and USCGC Cape Upright. Zukunft's senior staff assignments include chief of operations, Coast Guard Pacific Area, and chief of operations oversight, Coast Guard Atlantic Area, where he directly supervised all major cutter operations in the Atlantic and Pacific theaters. He also served as the chief of staff of the Fourteenth Coast Guard District in Honolulu.

==== Commandant of the U.S. Coast Guard ====
On 28 February 2014, United States Secretary of Homeland Security Jeh Johnson announced that U.S. President Barack Obama intended to nominate Zukunft for the position of Commandant of the U.S. Coast Guard, succeeding Admiral Robert J. Papp Jr. He was confirmed by the Senate on 15 May 2014, and frocked to full admiral the same day. He assumed the office of commandant on 30 May 2014.

== Awards and decorations ==
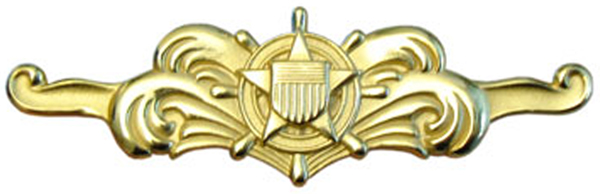

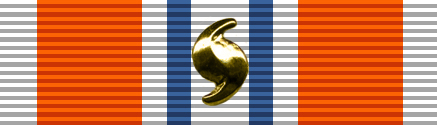

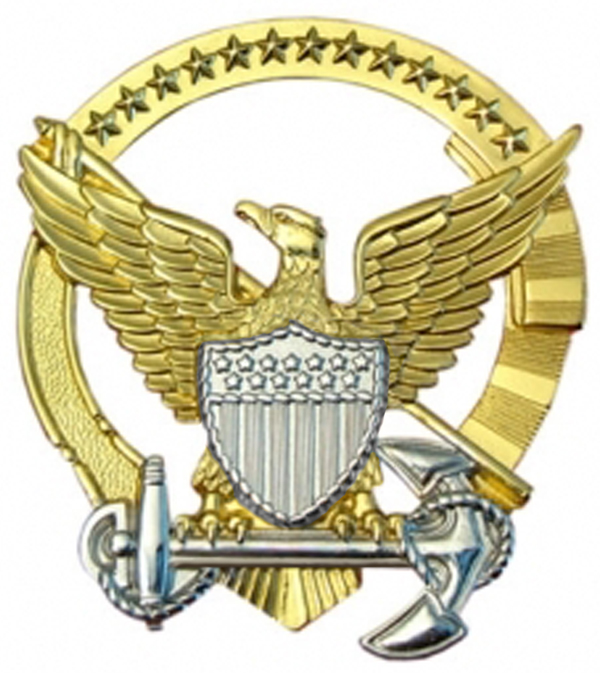

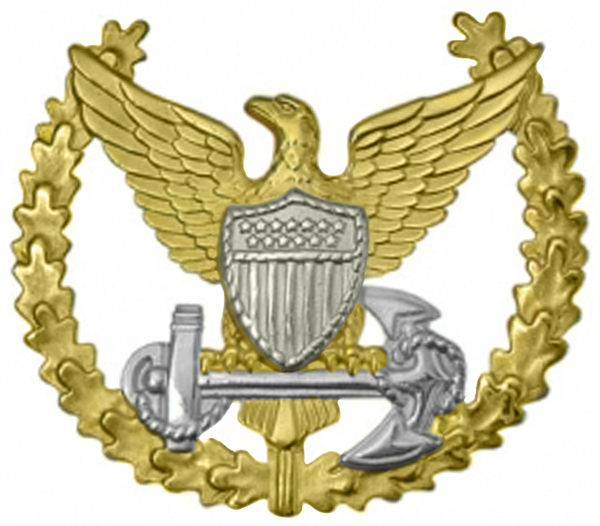

| Badge | Cutterman Officer Insignia | | |
| 1st row | | Homeland Security Distinguished Service Medal with one gold award star | |
| 2nd row | Coast Guard Distinguished Service Medal | Defense Superior Service Medal | Legion of Merit with two award stars |
| 3rd row | Meritorious Service Medal with four gold award stars and "O" device | Coast Guard Commendation Medal with one gold award star | Coast Guard Achievement Medal with gold award star and "O" device |
| 4th row | Coast Guard Presidential Unit Citation with "hurricane symbol" | Joint Meritorious Unit Award | Secretary of Transportation Outstanding Unit Award |
| 5th row | Coast Guard Unit Commendation with one award star and "O" device | Coast Guard Meritorious Unit Commendation with silver and gold award star and "O" device | Coast Guard "E" Ribbon with award star |
| 6th row | Coast Guard Bicentennial Unit Commendation | National Defense Service Medal with two bronze service stars | Global War on Terrorism Service Medal |
| 7th row | Humanitarian Service Medal with two service stars | Transportation 9-11 Ribbon | Special Operations Service Ribbon with one service star |
| 8th row | Sea Service Ribbon with three service stars | Rifle Marksmanship Medal with silver expert device | Pistol Marksmanship Ribbon |
| Badges | Command Afloat Pin | | Command Ashore Pin |

Military offices
| Preceded by Robert J. Papp Jr. | Commandant of the Coast Guard; 2014–2018 | Succeeded by Karl L. Schultz |
