= Charles D. Michel =

US Coast Guard Admiral

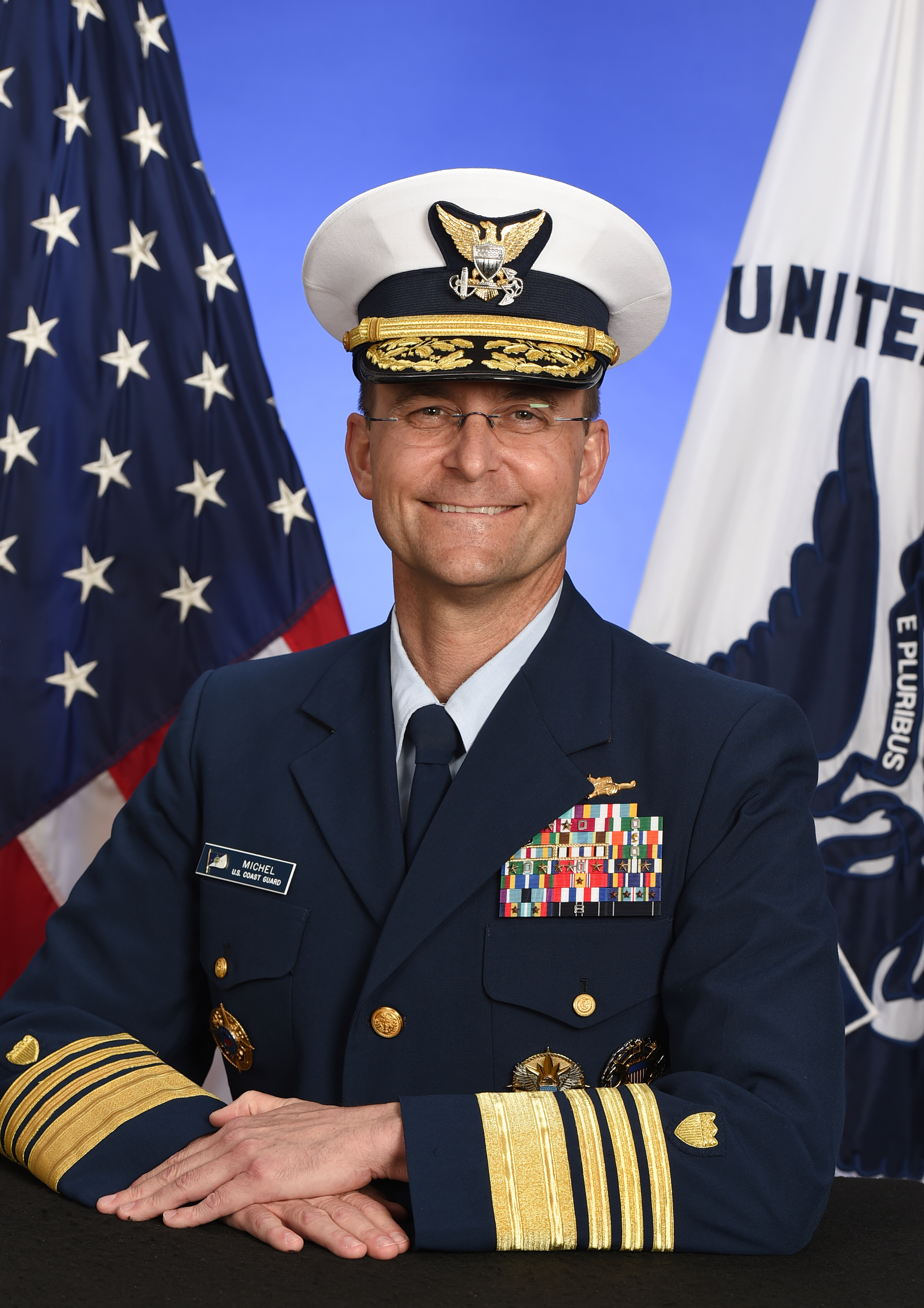
- Born: April 7, 1963 (age 63); Lawton, Oklahoma, U.S.
- Military career
- Allegiance: United States
- Branch: United States Coast Guard
- Service years: 1985–2018
- Rank: Admiral
- Commands: Vice Commandant of the Coast Guard; Director of Joint Interagency Task Force South; Commanding officer of USCGC Resolute; Commanding officer of USCGC Cape Current
- Awards: Homeland Security Distinguished Service Medal; Coast Guard Distinguished Service Medal; Defense Superior Service Medal; Legion of Merit (5)

Charles David Michel (born April 7, 1963) is a former United States Coast Guard admiral who last served as the 30th vice commandant of the U.S. Coast Guard. He is the first vice commandant to hold the rank of admiral while in office. Originally a vice admiral when he assumed office on August 6, 2015, Michel was promoted to four-star admiral on May 24, 2016, when the Coast Guard Authorization Act of 2015 elevated the statutory rank for the position to admiral. Michel is also the first career judge advocate in any of the armed forces to achieve four-star rank. Michel retired from the Coast Guard on May 24, 2018, after over 33 years of service.

== Early life and education ==
Michel was born in Lawton, Oklahoma, in 1963 and graduated from Brandon High School at Brandon, Florida in 1981. Michel graduated from the U.S. Coast Guard Academy with a degree in marine engineering with high honors in 1985. He also graduated in 1992 summa cum laude from the University of Miami School of Law as the salutatorian and is a member of The Florida Bar.

== Career ==
Michel has served on four cutters including a tour aboard USCGC Decisive as deck watch officer, USCGC Dauntless as executive officer, and tours as commanding officer on USCGC Cape Current and USCGC Resolute. Other assignments have included a tour as staff attorney for the Eighth Coast Guard District at New Orleans, Louisiana and assignments at Coast Guard Headquarters in Washington, D.C. as head of the operations division the Office of Maritime and International Law and a later tour as chief of the same office. Michel also served a tour as legislative counsel for the office of congressional and governmental affairs. His flag assignments include director, governmental and public affairs, military advisor to the Secretary of Homeland Security, director, Joint Interagency Task Force South, deputy commander, U.S. Coast Guard Atlantic Area, and deputy commandant of operations at Coast Guard Headquarters.

== Awards and decorations ==
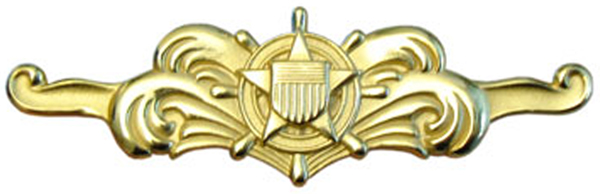

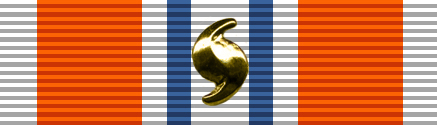

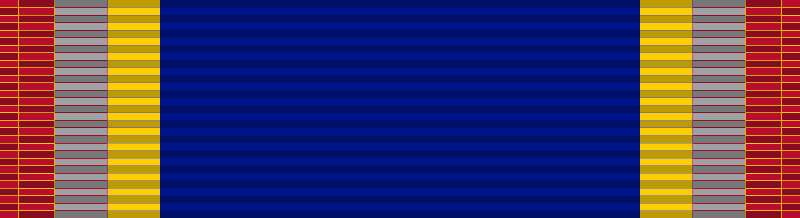

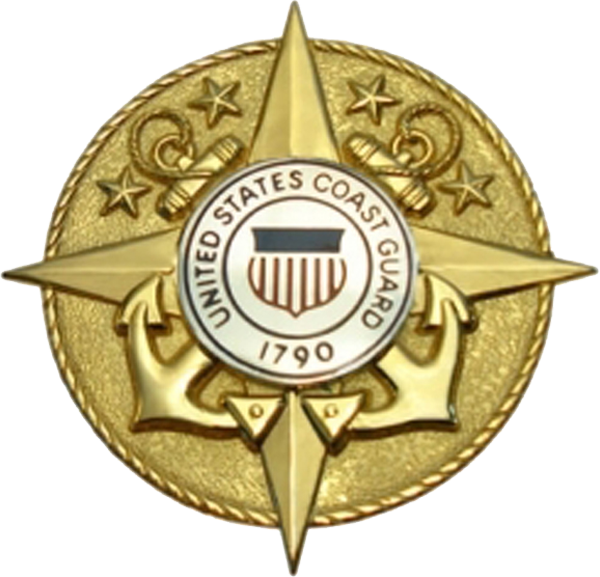
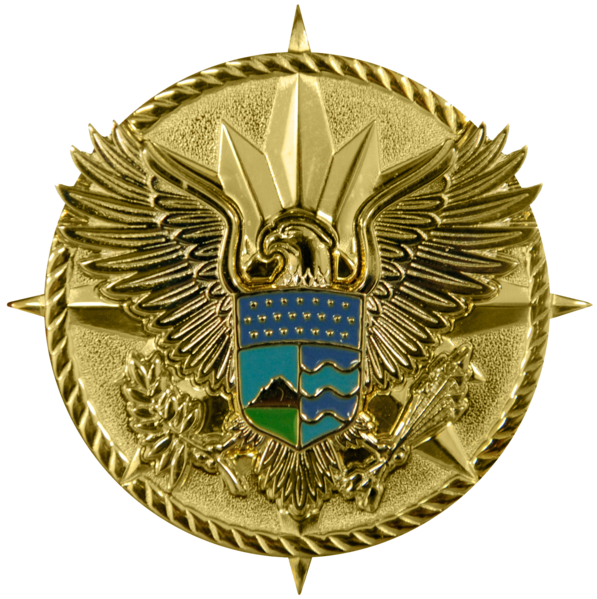
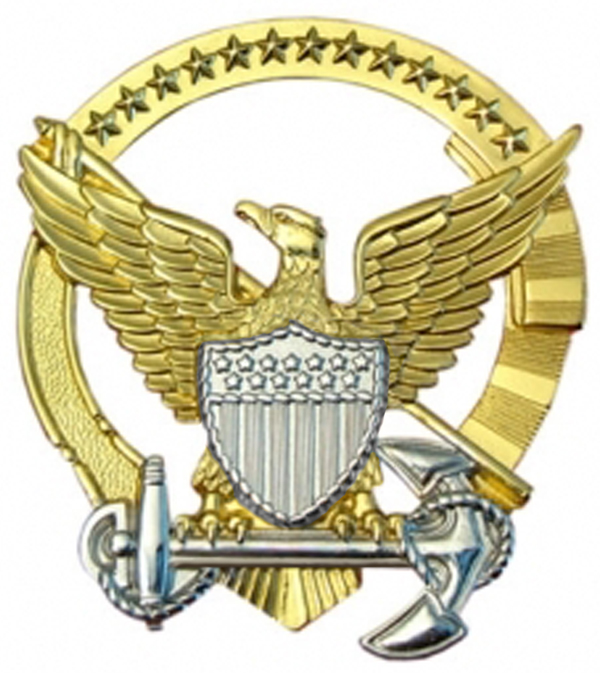

Badge	Cutterman Insignia (Officer)		
1st row	Homeland Security Distinguished Service Medal		
2nd row	Coast Guard Distinguished Service Medal	Defense Superior Service Medal	Legion of Merit with four gold award stars
3rd row	Meritorious Service Medal with gold award star and Operational Distinguishing Device	Coast Guard Commendation Medal with "O" device	Coast Guard Achievement Medal with gold award star and "O" device
4th row	Commandant's Letter of Commendation Ribbon	Coast Guard Presidential Unit Citation with "hurricane symbol"	Joint Meritorious Unit Award
5th row	Secretary of Transportation Outstanding Unit Award	Coast Guard Unit Commendation with "O" device	Coast Guard Meritorious Unit Commendation with two award stars and "O" device
6th row	Meritorious Team Commendation with three award stars and "O" device	Coast Guard "E" Ribbon with two award stars	Coast Guard Bicentennial Unit Commendation
7th row	National Defense Service Medal with one bronze service star	Global War on Terrorism Service Medal	Humanitarian Service Medal
8th row	Transportation 9-11 Ribbon	Special Operations Service Ribbon with four service stars	Sea Service Ribbon with two service stars
9th row	Colombian Navy Distinguished Service Medal	Rifle Marksmanship Ribbon with silver sharpshooter device	Pistol Marksmanship Ribbon
Badges	Commandant Staff Badge	Office of the Secretary of Homeland Security Identification Badge	Command Afloat Pin; Joint Staff Identification Badge

== Dates of rank ==
Ensign	Lieutenant, Junior Grade	Lieutenant	Lieutenant Commander	Commander	Captain
O-1	O-2	O-3	O-4	O-5	O-6
May 22, 1985	November 22, 1986	May 22, 1990	September 1, 1995	October 1, 2000	March 1, 2006

Rear Admiral (lower half)	Rear Admiral (upper half)	Vice Admiral	Admiral
O-7	O-8	O-9	O-10
October 1, 2009	July 1, 2012	May 2, 2014	May 24, 2016

== Personal life ==
In addition to his military awards, Michel was the American Bar Association Young Lawyer of the Year for the Coast Guard in 1995, and the Judge Advocates Association Career Armed Services Attorney of the Year for the U.S. Coast Guard in 2000. Also, Michel has received the USCG Public Service Commendation certificate.

== Notes ==
Citations

References cited

- "Charles D. Michel". Notable People Biographies. U.S. Coast Guard Historian's Office.
- "Flag Officer and Senior Executive Service Assignments". Internet Releasable Announcements. U.S. Coast Guard. Archived from the original on 29 August 2015.

Military offices
Preceded by Peter Neffenger	Vice Commandant of the Coast Guard; 2015–2018	Succeeded by Charles W. Ray
