= Awards and decorations of the United States Coast Guard =

Military medals and ribbons of the United States Coast Guard

Awards and decorations of the United States Coast Guard are military medals and ribbons of the United States Coast Guard which are currently issued under the authority of the Department of Homeland Security.

Prior to 2002, such awards were issued by the Secretary of Transportation and Coast Guard personnel were eligible to receive a variety of Department of Transportation (DOT) civilian decorations. Since transferring to the Department of Homeland Security, the issuance of DOT awards has been discontinued in the Coast Guard, although such awards may still be seen on active duty Coast Guard uniforms.

Coast Guard military awards are similar to U.S. Navy awards (often with nearly identical ribbons save for an additional white stripe) and Coast Guard personnel are eligible to receive all inter-service awards and decorations, authorized foreign awards and international decorations.

The current active awards and decorations of the U.S. Coast Guard are as follows:

== Coast Guard Medals ==
=== Personal Awards and Decorations ===
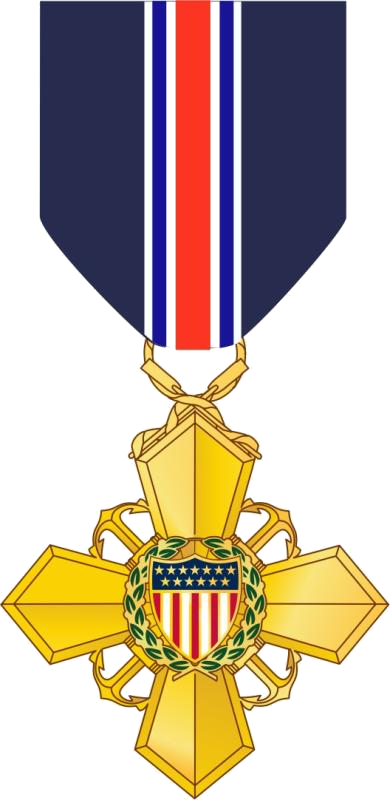
Coast Guard Cross

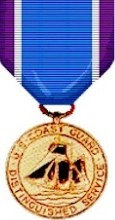
Coast Guard Distinguished Service Medal

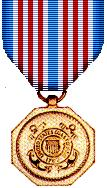
Coast Guard Medal

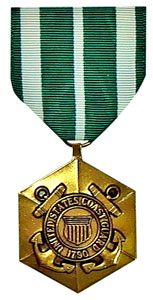
Coast Guard Commendation Medal

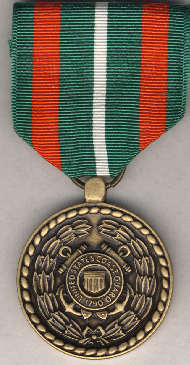
Coast Guard Achievement Medal

=== Coast Guard Good Conduct and Service Medals ===
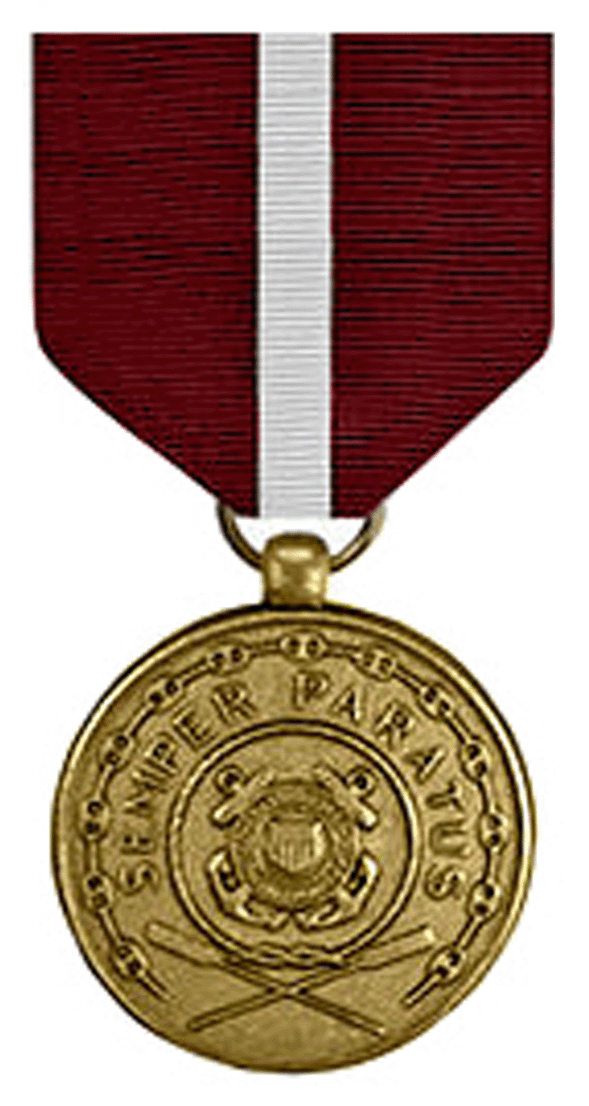
Coast Guard Good Conduct Medal

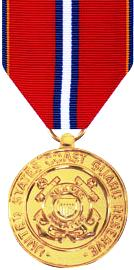
Coast Guard Reserve Good Conduct Medal

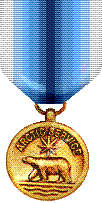
Coast Guard Arctic Service Medal

=== Coast Guard Lifesaving Medals ===
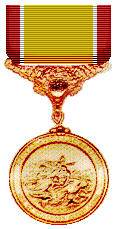
Gold Lifesaving Medal

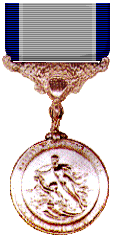
Silver Lifesaving Medal

Note: These are not classified as military decorations, but are awarded by the Commandant of the Coast Guard

== Coast Guard Unit Awards ==
Coast Guard Presidential Unit Citation

DHS Outstanding Unit Award

Coast Guard Unit Commendation

Coast Guard Meritorious Unit Commendation

Meritorious Team Commendation

Coast Guard "E" Ribbon

== Coast Guard Ribbons ==
Commandant's Letter of Commendation Ribbon

Coast Guard Combat Action Ribbon

Enlisted Person of the Year Ribbon

Special Operations Service Ribbon

Coast Guard Sea Service Ribbon

Restricted Duty Ribbon

Coast Guard Overseas Service Ribbon

Coast Guard Basic Training Honor Graduate Ribbon

Coast Guard Recruiting Service Ribbon

== Coast Guard Marksmanship Awards/Medals ==
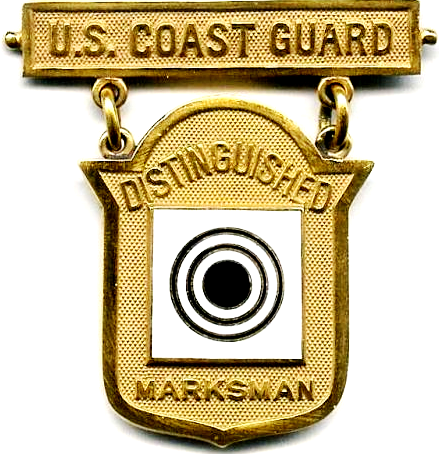
Coast Guard Distinguished Marksman Award/Badge

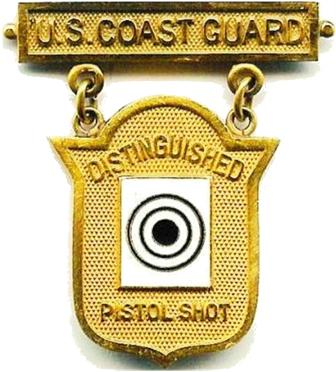
Coast Guard Distinguished Pistol Shot Award/Badge

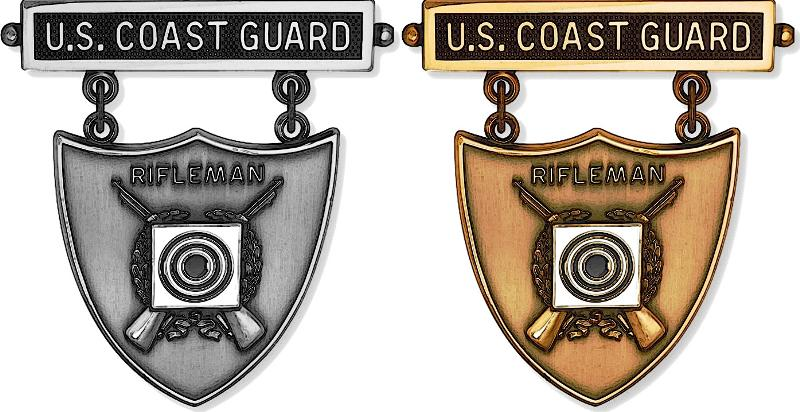
Coast Guard Rifleman Excellence-In-Competition Award/Badge (Rifleman EIC Badges earned at national matches have the word "NATIONAL" etched at their base.)

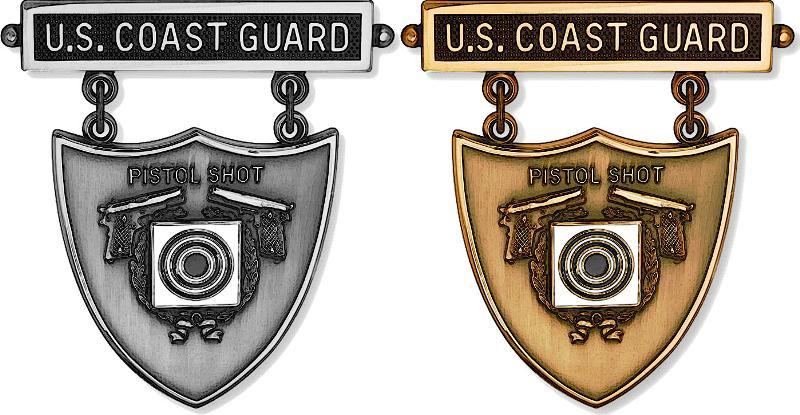
Coast Guard Pistol Shot Excellence-In-Competition Award/Badge (Pistol Shot EIC Badges earned at national matches have the word "NATIONAL" etched at their base.)

President's Hundred Tab

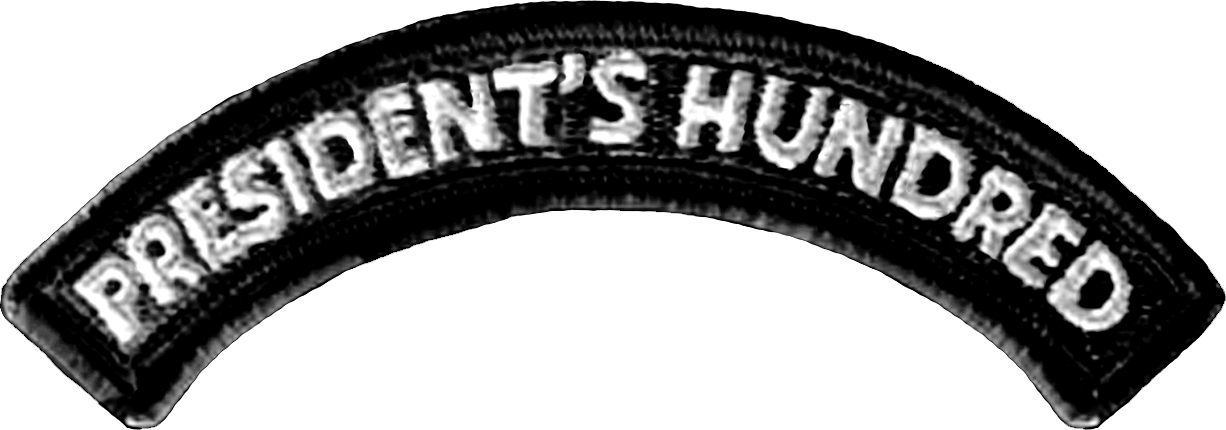

Enlisted Only

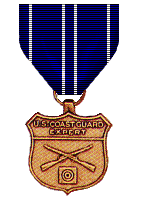
Coast Guard Expert Rifleman Medal

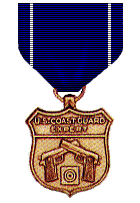
Coast Guard Expert Pistol Shot Medal

Coast Guard Rifle Sharpshooter Ribbon

Coast Guard Pistol Sharpshooter Ribbon

Coast Guard Rifle Marksmanship Ribbon

Coast Guard Pistol Marksmanship Ribbon

== Order of precedence ==
The following is the ribbon order of precedence authorized for wear by the U.S. Coast Guard. The list contains awards and decorations for the departments of Defense (including Army, Navy and Air Force), Homeland Security and Transportation:

Key:

Bold = denotes agency-level (DHS or DOT) award or U.S. Coast Guard award
Bold italic = denotes U.S. Coast Guard award is obsolete
Italic = denotes award is obsolete

- **Personal decorations**

Medal of Honor	**Coast Guard Cross**	Navy Cross	Distinguished Service Cross	Air Force Cross	**Homeland Security**; **Distinguished Service Medal**
**Transportation**; **Distinguished Service Medal**	Defense; Distinguished Service Medal	**Coast Guard**; **Distinguished Service Medal**	Navy; Distinguished Service Medal	Army; Distinguished Service Medal	Air Force; Distinguished Service Medal
Silver Star	**DOT's Secretary**; **Award for Outstanding Achievement**	Defense Superior Service Medal	**Guardian Medal**	Legion of Merit	Distinguished Flying Cross
**Coast Guard Medal**	Navy and Marine Corps Medal	Soldier's Medal	Airman's Medal	**Gold Lifesaving Medal**	Bronze Star
Purple Heart	Defense Meritorious Service Medal	Meritorious Service Medal	Air Medal	**Silver Lifesaving Medal**	Aerial Achievement Medal
**DOT's Secretary**; **Award for Meritorious Achievement**	Joint Service; Commendation Medal	**Coast Guard**; **Commendation Medal**	Navy and Marine Corps; Commendation Medal	Army; Commendation Medal	Air Force; Commendation Medal
**DOT's Secretary**; **Award for Superior Achievement**	Joint Service; Achievement Medal	**Transportation 9-11 Medal**	**Coast Guard**; **Achievement Medal**	Navy and Marine Corps; Achievement Medal	Army; Achievement Medal
Air Force; Achievement Medal	**Commandant's**; **Letter of Commendation Ribbon**	**Coast Guard**; **Combat Action Ribbon**	Navy Combat Action Ribbon (Navy/Marine Corps)		

- **Unit decorations**

**Coast Guard**; **Presidential Unit Citation**	Navy and Marine Corps; Presidential Unit Citation	Army and Air Force; Presidential Unit Citation	**Department of Homeland Security**; **Outstanding Unit Award**	Joint Meritorious Unit Award	**Secretary of Transportation**; **Outstanding Unit Award**
**Coast Guard**; **Unit Commendation**	Navy; Unit Commendation	Air Force Gallant Unit Citation	**Coast Guard**; **Meritorious Unit Commendation**	Navy; Meritorious Unit Commendation	Air Force; Meritorious Unit Award
**Meritorious Team Commendation**	Air Force; Outstanding Unit Award	**Coast Guard** **"E" Ribbon**	Navy "E" Ribbon	Air Force; Organizational Excellence Award	**Coast Guard**; **Bicentennial Unit Commendation**

- **Conduct medals**

Prisoner of War Medal	**Coast Guard**; **Good Conduct Medal**	Navy; Good Conduct Medal	Marine Corps; Good Conduct Medal	Army; Good Conduct Medal	Air Force; Good Conduct Medal
	**Coast Guard Reserve**; **Good Conduct Medal**	Naval Reserve; Meritorious Service Medal	Selected Marine Corps; Reserve Medal	Army Reserve Components; Achievement Medal	Air Reserve Forces; Meritorious Service Medal

- **U.S. service, campaign and training awards**
- **Authorized non-U.S. service awards and foreign decorations**
- **Marksmanship awards**
