= Unit citation =

A unit citation is a formal, honorary mention by high authority of a military unit's specific and outstanding performance, notably in battle.

Similar mentions can also be made for individual soldiers.

Alternatively or concurrently, the unit can be awarded an honorary title, a mention on the flag or a decoration.

In France, since 1916, the fourragère (an ornamental colored cord) is worn on the uniform by the members of a unit which had received several citations. This tradition has since spread to other countries.

== Unit citations by country ==
=== Australia ===
- Unit Citation for Gallantry
- Meritorious Unit Citation
- Group Bravery Citation – civilian award

=== Belgium ===
- Croix de guerre WWII version (also an individual award)

=== Canada ===
The banner of the C-in-C Unit Commendation

- Commander-in-Chief Unit Commendation (combat zone)
- Canadian Forces' Unit Commendation (non-combat zone)

=== France ===
- Légion d'honneur (also an individual award)
- Ordre de la Libération (also an individual award)
- Médaille militaire (also an individual award)

=== India ===
- Chief of Air Staff's citation - for Indian Air Force units
- President's Colour Award - the award of Military colours, standards and guidons to Indian Armed Forces units

=== Luxembourg ===
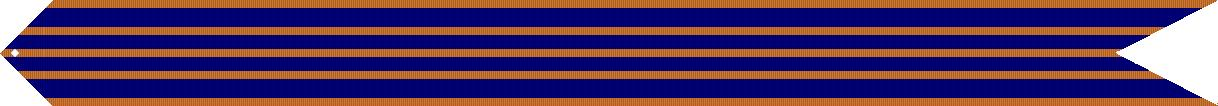
- Luxembourg War Cross (also an individual award)

=== Netherlands ===
- Military William Order (also an individual award)

=== Philippines ===
- Philippine Presidential Unit Citation
- Barangay Presidential Unit Citation Badge
- various single incident commemorative unit citations/badges.

=== Portugal ===
- War Cross (also an individual award)

=== South Korea ===
- Republic of Korea Presidential Unit Citation

=== South Vietnam ===
- Republic of Vietnam Presidential Unit Citation
- Vietnam Gallantry Cross Unit Citation (also an individual award)
- Vietnam Civil Actions Unit Citation (also an individual award)

=== Ukraine ===
- For Courage and Bravery

=== United States ===
Military (in order of precedence)

Level	Army	Navy/Marines	Air Force	Coast Guard	Individual equivalent
Commander-in-Chief	Presidential Unit Citation				Distinguished Service Cross (Army); Navy Cross; Air Force Cross; Coast Guard Cross
Department of Defense	Joint Meritorious Unit Award				Defense Superior Service Medal
branch-specific awards	Valorous Unit Award	Navy Unit Commendation	Gallant Unit Citation	Coast Guard Unit Commendation	Silver Star (VUA, GUC); Silver Star or Legion of Merit (NUC); Meritorious Service Medal (CGUC)
branch-specific awards	Meritorious Unit Commendation	Navy Meritorious Unit Commendation	Air Force Meritorious Unit Award	Coast Guard Meritorious Unit Commendation	Legion of Merit (MUC, AFMUA); Bronze Star (NMUC); CG Achievement Medal (CGMUC)
branch-specific awards	Superior Unit Award	none	Air Force Outstanding Unit Award	Meritorious Team Commendation	Commandant's Letter of Commendation (MTC)
Efficiency awards	None	Navy E Ribbon	Organizational Excellence Award	Coast Guard E Ribbon	–

Others (alphabetical)

- Coast Guard Bicentennial Unit Commendation (United States Coast Guard)
- Merchant Marine Gallant Ship Citation (United States Merchant Marine)
- National Intelligence Meritorious Unit Citation (United States Intelligence Community)
- NGA Meritorious Unit Award (National Geospatial-Intelligence Agency), and its predecessor the NIMA Meritorious Unit Award (National Imagery and Mapping Agency)
- NOAA Unit Citation Award (NOAA Corps)
- Public Health Service Commissioned Corps:
  - 3 levels-PHS Presidential Unit Citation, PHS Outstanding Unit Citation, PHS Unit Commendation.
  - Also the PHS Bicentennial Unit Commendation Award
- Secretary of Transportation Outstanding Unit Award (Department of Transportation, also a pre-2003 award of the United States Coast Guard)
- Unit Award for Excellence of Service (United States Department of the Interior)

Further, there are various unit awards of the National Guard, state defense forces, and auxiliaries like the Civil Air Patrol and Coast Guard Auxiliary.

== Sources and references ==
- Nouveau Petit Larousse Illustré, 1951 (in French)
