= Coast Guard Cross =

United States Coast Guard service cross medal

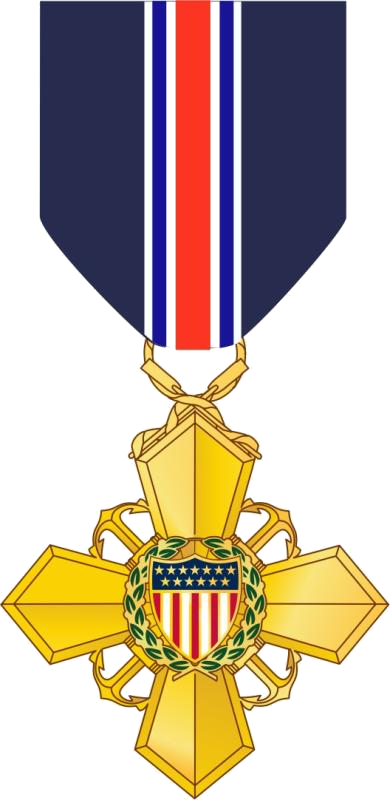
- Type: Military medal Service medal
- Awarded for: Extraordinary heroism in combat
- Presented by: United States Department of Homeland Security
- Eligibility: United States Coast Guardsmen
- Status: Currently approved Not yet awarded
- Established: 15 October 2010
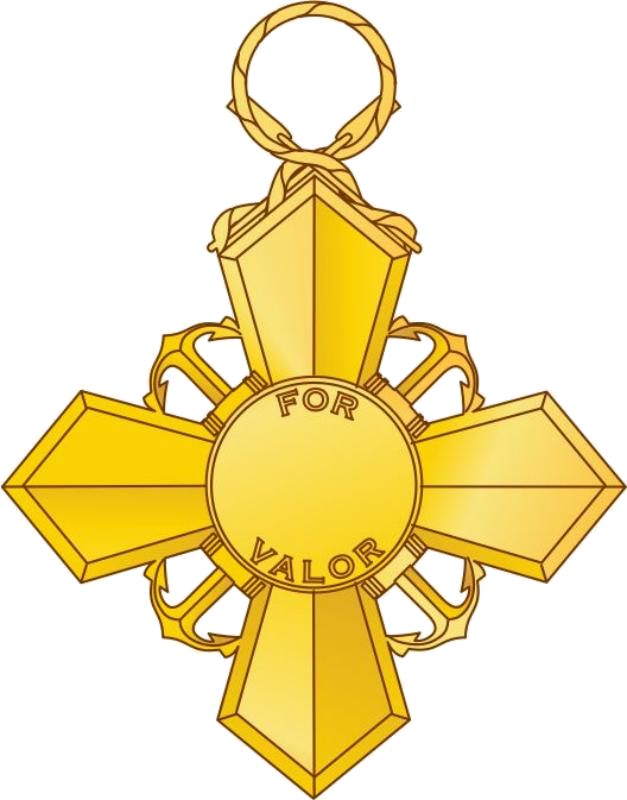
- Service ribbon

Precedence
- Next (higher): Medal of Honor
- Equivalent: Army: Distinguished Service Cross; Naval Service: Navy Cross; Air and Space Forces: Air Force Cross
- Next (lower): Department of Defense: Defense Distinguished Service Medal; Department of Homeland Security: Homeland Security Distinguished Service Medal

The Coast Guard Cross (CGC) is the United States Coast Guard's second highest military decoration for coast guardsmen who distinguish themselves by extraordinary heroism in combat with an armed enemy force. Established by Act of Congress on 15 October 2010, it is intended to recognize members of the United States Coast Guard for extraordinary heroism in action. Coast Guardsmen serving under the Department of the Navy are eligible to receive the Navy Cross. The Coast Guard Cross, though approved, has not yet been awarded. By virtue of having never been awarded, it is the rarest United States military award.

The Coast Guard Cross is equivalent to the Distinguished Service Cross of the United States Army, the Navy Cross of the United States Navy and Marine Corps, and the Air Force Cross of the United States Air Force and Space Force; collectively, these awards known as the "service crosses".

== History ==
In the past, during times of war, the U.S. Coast Guard has operated as part of the Department of the Navy. According to law under 14 U.S.C. § 103, "personnel of the Coast Guard shall be eligible to receive gratuities, medals, and other insignia of honor on the same basis as personnel in the naval service or serving in any capacity with the Navy." This allows the award of the Navy Cross for extraordinary heroism while engaged in combat or armed action. During World War II, six Coast Guardsmen, four officers and two enlisted, were awarded the Navy Cross.

On 4 August 1949, Public Law 63-535 was passed, bringing into force 14 U.S.C. § 2736 and 14 U.S.C. § 2739. This law established the Coast Guard Distinguished Service Medal and Coast Guard Medal. These awards were intended to parallel the Navy Distinguished Service Medal and the Navy and Marine Corps Medal, being awarded under the same criteria to Coast Guardsmen when not serving as a part of the Department of the Navy. This began the creation of a separate system of awards and decorations for the U.S. Coast Guard when not operating under the Department of the Navy. In 1963, Public Law 88-77 even allowed for the award of the Medal of Honor to a Coast Guardsman who met the award's criteria, without specifically being under the orders of the Navy.

On 15 October 2010, Public Law 111-281 was passed establishing the Coast Guard Cross under 14 U.S.C. § 2735.

== Criteria ==
The statute allows the president of the United States to award the Coast Guard Cross, to any person who distinguishes themselves by extraordinary heroism not justifying the award of the Medal of Honor, while serving in any capacity with the Coast Guard, when the Coast Guard is not operating under the Department of the Navy, under one of the following conditions:

- While engaged in action against an enemy of the United States
- While engaged in military operations involving conflict with a foreign opposing force or international terrorist organization
- While serving with friendly foreign forces engaged in an armed conflict against an opposing armed force in which the United States is not a belligerent party.

== Appearance ==
The Coast Guard Cross is a four armed cross urdeé. It is made of red brass with a 24 karat gold plated matte finish. The pendant is 2 1/4 inches high and 1 3/4 inches wide. Surmounting the cross is an integral suspension ring which takes the form of a rope with crossed oars. Between the arms of the cross are anchors.

On the obverse, in the center of the cross is a shield similar to that found in the Great Seal of the United States. The stripes of the shield are alternating red and white colored enamel, while the chief is enameled blue with white five-pointed stars. The shield is surrounded by a wreath of twenty-six enameled green leaves.

The reverse is identical to the obverse, except the center does not have a shield. In the center is the inscription FOR arched above and VALOR arched below.

The cross is suspended from a 1 3/8 inch ribbon of navy blue. In the center is a 5/32 inch stripe of scarlet, flanked by 1/16 inch stripes of ultramarine blue, bordered in white.

The Coast Guard Cross was designed by the United States Army Institute of Heraldry.

== See also ==
- Awards and decorations of the United States Coast Guard
