= Distinguished service medal =

Distinguished Service Medal (DSM) is a high award of a nation, state or country.

Examples include:

- Distinguished Service Medal (Australia) (established 1991), awarded to personnel of the Australian Defence Force for distinguished leadership in action
- Distinguished Service Medal (India) (established 1907), awarded by the British Empire to Indian citizens serving in the Indian armed forces and police
- Distinguished Service Medal (Ireland), a series of three decorations issued by the Irish Defence Forces
- Medal of Distinguished Service (Israel) (established 1970), awarded for exemplary bravery in the line of duty
- Distinguished Service Medal (Mexico), awarded to Army and Air Force personnel who demonstrate initiative and dedication throughout the course of their military career
- Vishisht Seva Medal or Distinguished Service Medal (India) (established 1960), to recognize "distinguished service of a high order" to all ranks of the Indian Armed Forces
- Vishista Seva Vibhushanaya or Distinguished Service Decoration (Sri Lanka) (established 1981), awarded for exceptional, distinguished, and loyal service over a 25-year period
- State Medal of Distinguished Service (Turkey) (established 1983), for distinguished service in contribution to the Turkish State through generous action, self-sacrifice, accomplishment or merit
- Armed Forces Medal of Distinguished Service (Turkey) (established 1967), bestowed upon individuals whose contributions to the strengthening of the Turkish Armed Forces have been extraordinarily high
- Distinguished Service Medal (United Kingdom) (1914–1993), awarded to non-commissioned officers of the Royal Navy and other Commonwealth navies for bravery and resourcefulness on active service

== United States ==
- Coast Guard Distinguished Service Medal (established 1949)
- Coast and Geodetic Survey Distinguished Service Medal (established 1945)
- Defense Distinguished Service Medal (established 1970)
- Distinguished Service Medal (U.S. Air and Space Forces) (established 1960)
- Distinguished Service Medal (U.S. Army) (established 1918)
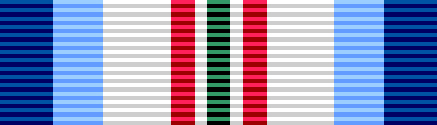
- Homeland Security Distinguished Service Medal (established 2002)
- Lone Star Distinguished Service Medal, Texas
- Merchant Marine Distinguished Service Medal (established 1943)
- NASA Distinguished Service Medal (established 1959)
- National Intelligence Distinguished Service Medal (established 1993)
- Navy Distinguished Service Medal (established 1919; for both US Navy and US Marine Corps)
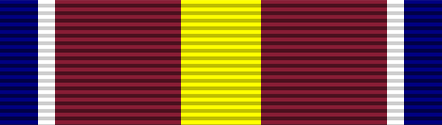
- Public Health Service Distinguished Service Medal
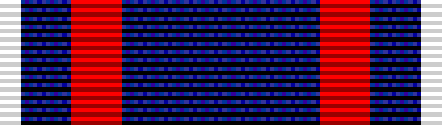
- Transportation Distinguished Service Medal (established 1992)
- Vermont Distinguished Service Medal (established 1999)
