= Title 14 of the United States Code =

U.S. federal statutes on the Coast Guard

Title 14 of the United States Code is a positive law title of the United States Code concerning the United States Coast Guard.

- Subtitle I—Establishment, Powers, Duties, and Administration
- Subtitle II—Personnel
- Subtitle III—Coast Guard Reserve and Auxiliary
- Subtitle IV—Coast Guard Authorizations and Reports to Congress

== History ==
From its inception as part of the first issue of the U.S. Code in 1926, Title 14 has contained laws concerning the U.S. Coast Guard and been entitled "Coast Guard". On August 4, 1949, the title was enacted as a positive law title. In the 115th Congress, H.R. 1726 was introduced to recodify Title 14. This bill was reported out by committee with a report in May 2017. This particular bill did not pass Congress but was included as Title I of S. 140 which became law in December 2018. In the version of Title 14 published by the Office of the Law Revision Counsel, there are two tables at the beginning of the title, the first of which shows the re-designation of sections made by the 2018 re-codification and the second of which shows disposition of non-positive law sections to the 1949 positive law title.

== Subtitle I — Establishment, Powers, Duties, and Administration ==
Subtitle I

- Chapter 1 — Establishment and duties
- Chapter 3 — Composition and organization
- Chapter 5 — Functions and powers
- Chapter 7 — Cooperation
- Chapter 9 — Administration
- Chapter 11 — Acquisitions

== Subtitle II — Personnel ==
Subtitle II

- Chapter 19 — Coast Guard Academy
- Chapter 21 — Personnel; officers
- Chapter 23 — Personnel; enlisted
- Chapter 25 — Personnel; general provisions
- Chapter 27 — Pay, allowances, awards, and other rights and benefits
- Chapter 29 — Coast Guard family support, child care, and housing

== Subtitle III — Coast Guard Reserve and Auxiliary ==
Subtitle III

- Chapter 37 — Coast Guard Reserve
- Chapter 39 — Coast Guard Auxiliary
- Chapter 41 — General provisions for Coast Guard Reserve and Auxiliary

== Subtitle IV — Coast Guard Authorizations and Reports to Congress ==
Subtitle IV

- Chapter 49 — Authorizations
- Chapter 51 — Reports
