= Homeland Security Distinguished Service Medal =

United States Homeland Security Department distinguished service medal

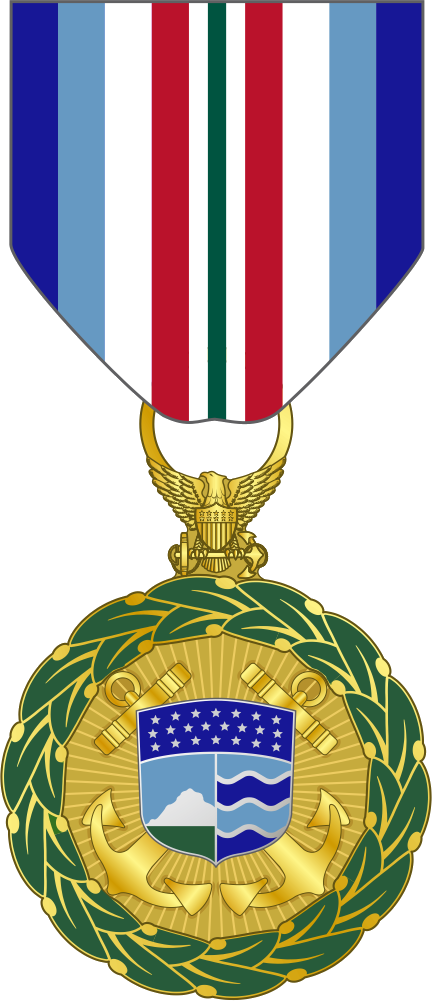
- Type: Military medal Distinguished service medal
- Awarded for: Exceptionally meritorious service in a duty of great responsibility
- Presented by: United States Department of Homeland Security
- Eligibility: United States Armed Forces service members
- Status: Currently awarded
- Established: 28 February 2003 (retroactive to 1 March 2002)
- First award: 2006
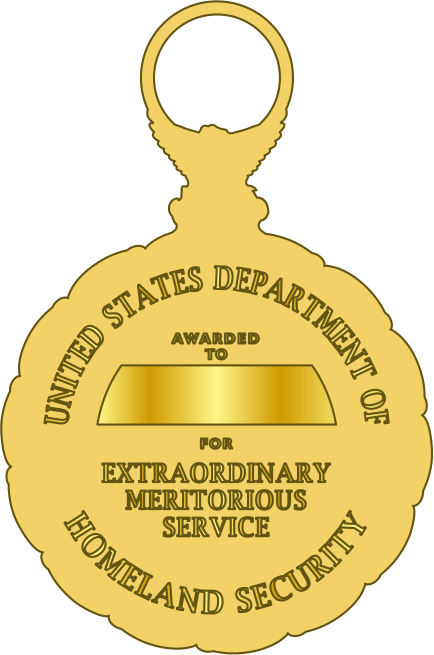
- Service ribbon

Precedence
- Next (higher): Army: Distinguished Service Cross; Naval Service: Navy Cross; Air and Space Forces: Air Force Cross; Coast Guard: Coast Guard Cross
- Equivalent: Department of Defense: Defense Distinguished Service Medal
- Next (lower): Army: Distinguished Service Medal (Army); Naval Service: Navy Distinguished Service Medal; Air and Space Forces: Distinguished Service Medal (Air and Space Forces); Coast Guard: Coast Guard Distinguished Service Medal

The Homeland Security Distinguished Service Medal is a military decoration of the Department of Homeland Security, which is presented to United States Armed Forces service members for exceptionally meritorious service. The current version of the medal was established in February 2003, retroactive to March 1, 2002.

It is equivalent to the United States Department of Defense's Defense Distinguished Service Medal.

== History ==
The decoration was originally established as the Transportation Distinguished Service Medal by Executive Order 12824, signed by President George H. W. Bush on December 7, 1992. On February 28, 2003, President George W. Bush signed Executive Order 13286, which, among other things, replaced the Transportation version of the award with the Homeland Security version retroactively to March 1, 2002. On April 5, 2011, President Barack Obama amended Executive Order 12824, as amended, modifying the award eligibility from "a member of the Coast Guard" to "any member of the Armed Forces of the United States".

== Order of precedence ==
As a distinguished service medal, this decoration is one of the highest awards that can be bestowed upon a member of the U.S. Armed Forces.

The award would be worn after the Medal of Honor, Distinguished Service Cross, Navy Cross, Air Force Cross, and Coast Guard Cross and, for members of the Coast Guard, before the Defense Distinguished Service Medal and any of the service-specific Distinguished Service Medals from the other armed services. For members of all the other military services, the Homeland Security Distinguished Service Medal is worn before the service-specific DSMs but after the Defense Distinguished Service Medal. The medal may be awarded to any member of the Armed Forces of the United States.

== Notable recipients ==
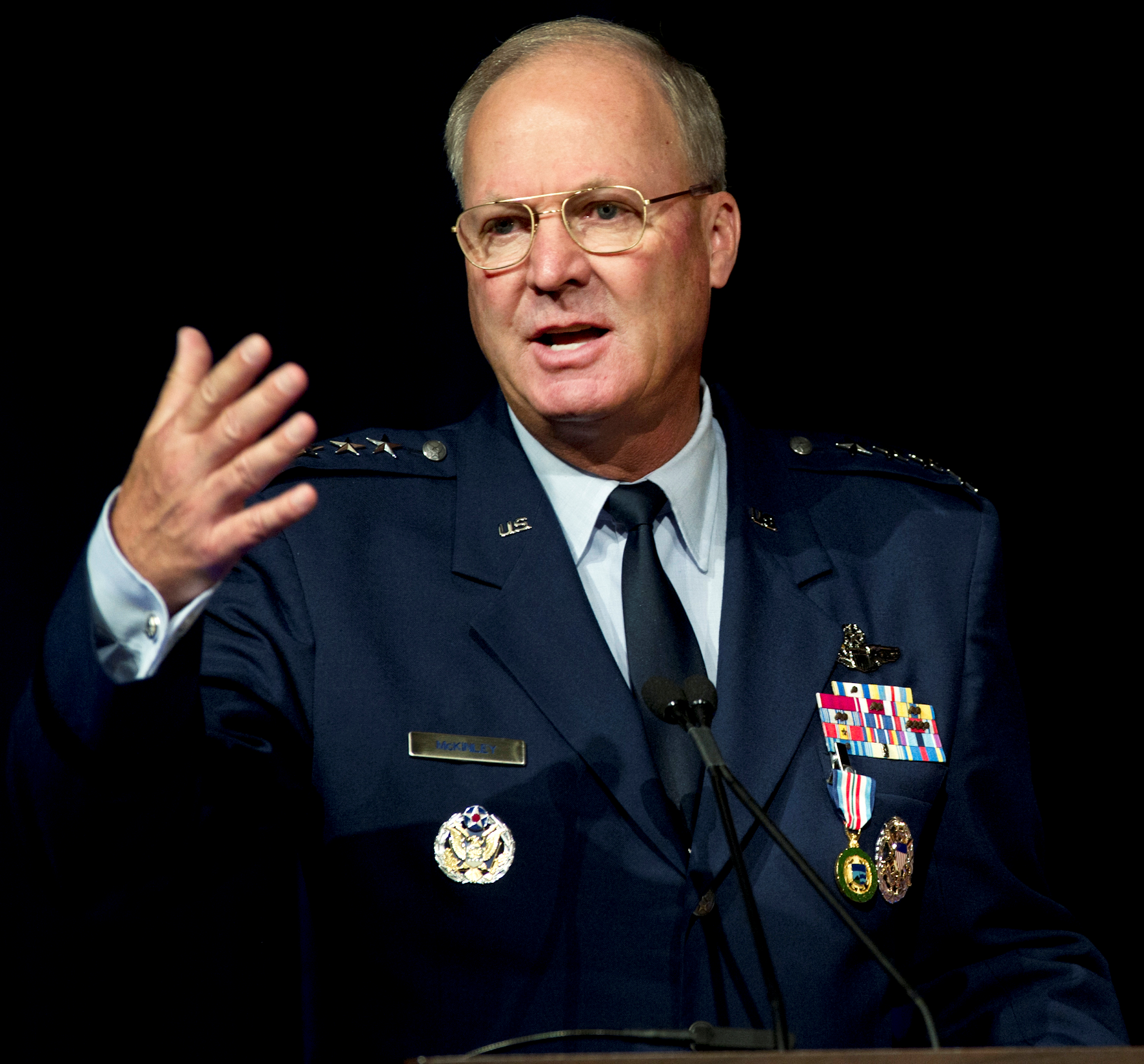
General Craig McKinley speaks after being awarded the Homeland Security Distinguished Service Medal.

- Admiral Thad W. Allen, first recipient in 2006 for his service in response to Hurricane Katrina, subsequent award in 2010 at the end of his term as Commandant of the Coast Guard
- Admiral Thomas H. Collins, in 2006 at the end of his term as Commandant of the Coast Guard
- Vice Admiral Vivien Crea, in 2009 at the end of her term as Vice Commandant of the Coast Guard
- General Craig R. McKinley, in 2012 at the end of his tenure as the Chief of the National Guard Bureau
- Admiral Charles D. Michel, in 2018 at the end of his term as Vice-Commandant of the Coast Guard
- Admiral Robert J. Papp, in 2014 at the end of his term as Commandant of the Coast Guard
- Vice Admiral David Pekoske, in 2010 at the end of his term as Vice Commandant of the United States Coast Guard
- Admiral Karl L. Schultz, in 2022 at the end of his term as Commandant of the Coast Guard
- Admiral Paul F. Zukunft, in 2011 for his service in response to the Deepwater Horizon oil spill and in 2018 at the end of his term as Commandant of the Coast Guard

== See also ==
- Awards and decorations of the United States military
- Awards and decorations of the United States Department of Homeland Security
- Inter-service awards and decorations of the United States military
- Distinguished Service Medals
