= Marksmanship Device =

United States military decoration

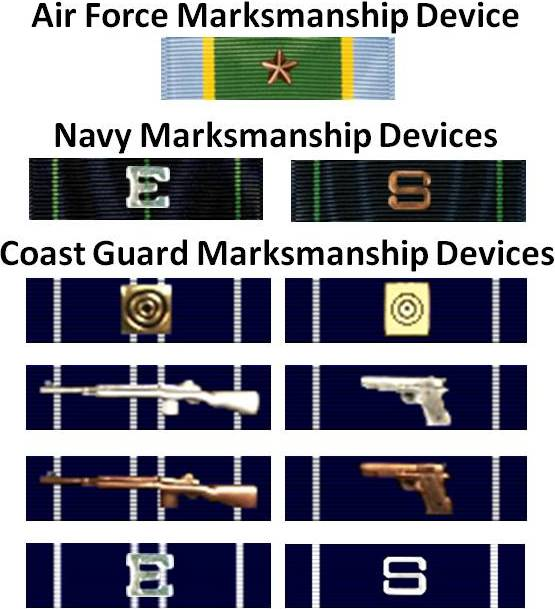

A Marksmanship Ribbon device is primarily a miniature metal rifle, pistol, target, service star, or letter E or S which may be worn if authorized on a Marksmanship Ribbon awarded to members of the United States Coast Guard, United States Air Force, and United States Navy.

== Air Force ==
The Air Force uses a bronze service star on top of their marksmanship ribbon to represent a qualification of expert in an additional weapon other than the one that originally earned the Airman the qualification ribbon. The Air Force's Small Arms Expert Marksmanship Ribbon, as it is known, is awarded to those who qualify as expert with either the service rifle or service pistol.

== Navy and Coast Guard ==
The Navy and Coast Guard present two marksmanship ribbon devices for scoring as a Sharpshooter or Expert on a pistol and rifle qualification course: the bronze S device and silver E device for the Navy and silver S and E devices for the Coast Guard. The Air Force uses a 3/16" bronze star to indicate expert qualification in both rifle and pistol. The Coast Guard also has additional ribbon devices which represent accomplishments in Civilian Marksmanship Program (CMP) sanctioned competitions.

The Expert Marksmanship device should not be confused with the Battle E Device. The Navy and Coast Guard Expert Marksmanship device is worn on the Marksmanship Ribbon in lieu of the full sized Marksmanship Medal. When wearing the Marksmanship Medal, the Marksmanship Ribbon with the Expert device is not worn. For a period of time, the E Device was bronze until three consecutive expert qualifications were achieved, then the device would change to silver with a permanent award status.

Coast Guardsman who have been awarded the bronze or silver Coast Guard Excellence-in-Competition (EIC) Pistol Shot or Rifleman Badge can wear a bronze or silver miniature replica of the M1911 or M14 attached to the U.S. Coast Guard Pistol or Rifle Marksmanship Ribbon, respectively, in lieu of wearing the EIC badge(s). Likewise, Coast Guardsman who have been awarded the Coast Guard Distinguished Pistol Shot or Marksman Badge can place a small gold metal replica of a pistol or rifle target, respectively, on the appropriate marksmanship ribbon vice having to wear the distinguished badge(s) on their dress uniforms.

From 1942 to 1960, the Navy awarded unique Distinguished Marksmanship Ribbons vs. devices for their existing marksmanship ribbons. Today, only Distinguished Marksmanship Badges are authorized for wear on Navy uniforms.

== National Guard ==
Governor's Twelve Ribbon with 3 bronze Hawthorn Clusters

Some State National Guard organizations also award marksmanship ribbons to their top shooters. In the Missouri National Guard, the top twelve guardsmen selected to represent their state at the Winston P. Wilson Rifle and Pistol Championships are awarded a Governor's Twelve Ribbon. Any guardsman who earns the award more than once wear a bronze or silver Hawthorn Cluster device(s) on top of the ribbon. A bronze Hawthorn Cluster notes the award of a second and succeeding awards, while a silver Hawthorn Cluster is worn in lieu of five bronze Hawthorn Clusters.

== See also ==
- United States military award devices
- Marksmanship Ribbon
- Marksmanship Medal
- Marksmanship badges (United States)
- Awards and decorations of the United States military
