= Coast Guard Unit Commendation =

Award of the United States Coast Guard

- Type: Ribbon
- Awarded for: "[V]alorous or extremely meritorious service, not involving combat, but in support of Coast Guard operations."
- Presented by: the Department of Homeland Security
- Eligibility: Non-combatant Military Unit
- Status: Currently awarded
- First award: 1963
- Final award: On going

Precedence
- Next (higher): Joint Meritorious Unit Award; Department of Transportation (Pre 2003): Secretary of Transportation Outstanding Unit Award
- Equivalent: Department of Transportation (Post 2003): Secretary of Transportation Outstanding Unit Award; Army: Valorous Unit Award; Naval Service: Navy Unit Commendation; Air and Space Forces: Gallant Unit Citation
- Next (lower): Meritorious Unit Commendation

The Coast Guard Unit Commendation is the highest peacetime unit award that may be awarded to military commands of the United States Coast Guard. The decoration was first created in 1963 and is presented to members of any Coast Guard unit that distinguishes itself by valorous or extremely meritorious service, not involving combat, but in support of Coast Guard operations.

== Usage ==
It may also be awarded to units and personnel of the other U.S. armed forces, typically when in support of operations where the Coast Guard is the lead service. One example was the award of the commendation with Operational Distinguishing Device to rescue squadrons of the U.S. Air Force and maritime patrol squadrons and helicopter squadrons of the U.S. Navy, when said units assisted the Coast Guard during search and recovery operations following the January 1986 loss of the NASA Space Shuttle Challenger.

Additional awards of the Coast Guard Unit Commendation are denoted by award stars. The Operational Distinguishing Device, a 5/16-inch (7.9 mm) silver letter "O" centered on the unit of the uniform ribbon, is also authorized for units which are presented the decoration for field operations and conditions.

== History ==
Prior to 2003, the Coast Guard Unit Commendation was subordinate to the Secretary of Transportation Outstanding Unit Award. With the transfer of the Coast Guard to the Department of Homeland Security, the Secretary of Transportation Outstanding Unit Award became obsolete, making the Coast Guard Unit Commendation the senior peacetime award, but junior to the Joint Meritorious Unit Award and the Presidential Unit Citation.

Admiral Paul Zukunft, Commandant, awarded the Coast Guard Unit Commendation to the Coast Guard Auxiliary on June 23, 2014, for members active from June 24, 2009, to June 23, 2014.

"Beyond the day to day, the Auxiliary has been there as part of the Coast Guard's total force in every major disaster," said Coast Guard Commandant ADM Zukunft at the ceremony. "During disasters, the Auxiliary takes action to provide air support, conduct search and rescue, fix aids to navigation, conduct public affairs and augment units at home stations whose responders are deployed." References: ALAUX 011/14; COMDTINST M16790.1G (Auxiliary Manual), Chapter 10; and COMDTINST M1650.25D, Medals and Awards Manual.

On the 80th anniversary of the USCG Auxiliary, on May 16, 2019, the US Coast Guard Auxiliary was awarded the Coast Guard Unit Commendation ribbon to all Auxiliarists by Karl Schultz the commandant of the Coast Guard. On June 23, 2024 Admiral Linda Fagan, Commandant, U.S. Coast Guard, awarded the U.S. Coast Guard Auxiliary the Coast Guard Unit Commendation in recognition of the U.S. Coast Guard Auxiliary's 85th anniversary.

== Dates awarded ==
The Coast Guard Auxiliary has been awarded the Coast Guard Unit Commendation a total of seven times:

1. September 9, 1993—For service period October 1991 through November 1992 while engaged in several massive operations including service during Hurricanes Andrew, Iniki, Typhoon Omar and instances of serious flooding.
2. August 10, 1999 – 60th Anniversary. For service period June 23, 1939 through June 23, 1999.
3. September 1, 2002 – For service period September 11, 2001 through September 1, 2002 with Operational Distinguishing Device (“O”).
4. June 23, 2009 – 70th Anniversary. For service period June 24, 1999 through June 23, 2009.
5. June 24, 2014 – 75th Anniversary. For service period June 24, 2009 through June 23, 2014.
6. May 16, 2019 – 80th Anniversary. For service period June 24, 2014 through June 23, 2019.
7. May 25, 2024 - 85th Anniversary. For service period June 24, 2019 through June 23, 2024.

== See also ==
- Awards and decorations of the United States Armed Forces
