= Marksmanship Medal =

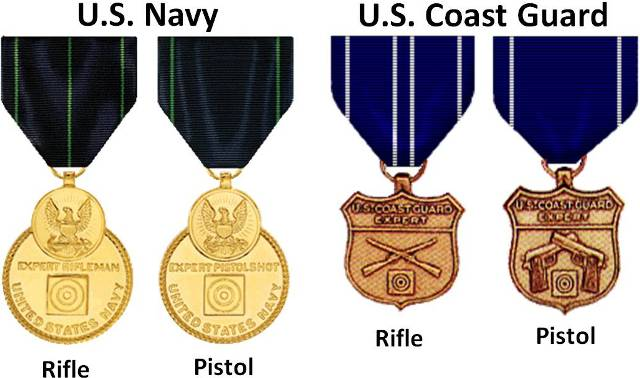
- Navy and Coast Guard Marksmanship Medals
- Type: Ribbon
- Presented by: Department of the Navy and Coast Guard
- Status: Current
- First award: 1969 (U.S. Navy)
- Ribbons: Navy (left), Coast Guard (right); rifle (above), pistol (below)

The Marksmanship Medal is a United States Navy and the U.S. Coast Guard military award and is the highest award one may receive for weapons qualification. The Marksmanship Medal is the equivalent of the Expert Marksmanship Badge in the U.S. Army and U.S. Marine Corps. Additionally, select State National Guard organizations award marksmanship medals to guardsmen who achieve some of the highest aggregate scores at state-level marksmanship competitions.

The Marksmanship Medal is awarded for qualifying as an expert marksman on either the SIG Sauer M18 (Navy or Coast Guard), 9×19mm Beretta M9 (Navy or Coast Guard), .40 S&W SIG P229 DAK (Coast Guard only), or M16 rifle. To qualify at the expert level, a superior score must be obtained on an approved weapons qualification course. The standard Navy weapons qualification course for pistol normally consists of several courses of fire from strong-side supported (standing), weak-side supported (standing), and strong-side supported (kneeling) positions. For the rifle, the Navy qualification course consists of firing from a sitting and prone positions.

Those qualifying as an expert marksman are authorized to wear the Marksmanship Medal, awarded as two separate decorations for rifle or pistol qualifications. Those having qualified on both pistol and rifle may receive both medals for simultaneous wear. The Marksmanship Medal is worn as a full-sized medal on dress uniforms. On a duty uniform all successful qualifiers may wear the award as the standard Marksmanship Ribbon. Those qualifying as an expert are authorized to wear the Expert device on the ribbon and those qualifying as a sharpshooter are authorized a "S" device (Navy-bronze and Coast Guard-silver) for that ribbon.

The Navy Marksmanship Medals were first issued in 1969.

Navy
M9 Service Pistol	Qualification	M16 Rifle or M4 Carbine
180–203	Marksman	140–159
204–227	Sharpshooter	160–169
228–240	Expert	170–200

Coast Guard
P229R DAK	Qualification	M4 Carbine Rifle
114–128	Marksman	140–166
129–143	Sharpshooter	167–174
144–150	Expert	175–200

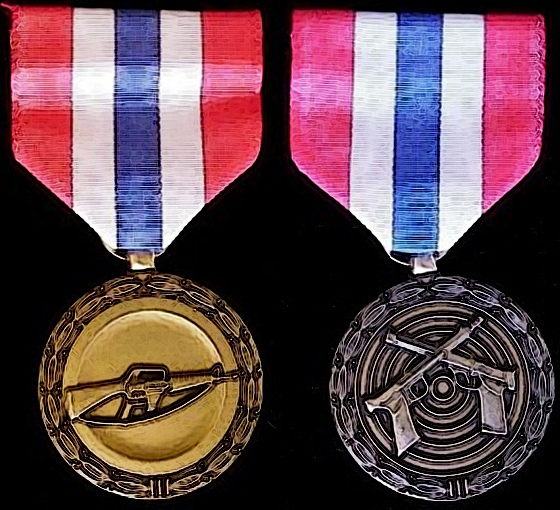
Alaska Adjutant General's Marksmanship Proficiency Medals

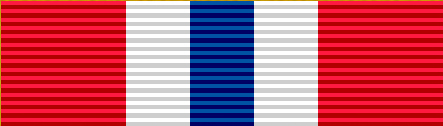
Similarly, the Alaska Department of Military and Veterans Affairs awards the Alaska Adjutant General's Marksmanship Proficiency Medals, one for rifle and one for pistol, to the top ten guardsman with the highest aggregate scores at the Alaska National Guard Adjutant General's Match. The winners of these awards are selected to join the state's marksmanship team to represent the Alaska National Guard at the Winston P. Wilson Rifle and Pistol Championships for a chance to win the Chief's Fifty Marksmanship Badge. A red, white, and blue ribbon is used to represent both medals ( ); however, the actual rifle and pistol medals suspended by this ribbon are distinct.

== See also ==
- Marksmanship Device
- Marksmanship Badge (United States)
- Awards and decorations of the United States military
