= Secretary of Transportation Outstanding Unit Award =

US government unit decoration

- Service ribbon of the Secretary of Transportation Outstanding Unit Award
- Type: Unit award
- Awarded for: Direct participation in missions of an operational "hands on" nature.
- Presented by: Department of Transportation
- Eligibility: Coast Guard and Department of Transportation personnel
- Established: November 3, 1994

Precedence
- Next (higher): Joint Meritorious Unit Award
- Equivalent: Army: Valorous Unit Award; Navy: Navy Unit Commendation; Air and Space Forces: Gallant Unit Citation; Coast Guard (Post 2003): Coast Guard Unit Commendation
- Next (lower): Coast Guard (Pre 2003): Coast Guard Unit Commendation
- Related: Secretary of Transportation Outstanding Achievement Medal

The Secretary of Transportation Outstanding Unit Award, formerly known as the DOT Outstanding Unit Award, is a U.S. government unit decoration which was established in 1994. The Presidential Unit Citation and Joint Meritorious Unit Award are considered senior to the Secretary of Transportation Outstanding Unit Award. Additional awards of the decoration were denoted by gold award stars.

Prior to 2003, the award was a unit award of the United States Coast Guard. During the time period issued, it was the highest Coast Guard unit award that could be awarded and was presented to those Coast Guard units which performed outstanding service to the Coast Guard as a whole.

On November 3, 1994, Secretary of Transportation Federico Pena awarded the Secretary of Transportation Outstanding Achievement Medal to the Coast Guard as a whole. The award was mounted on a plaque and presented to Admiral Robert E. Kramek, then-commandant of the Coast Guard. In order to provide members of the Coast Guard with a device denoting this award, the Secretary of Transportation Outstanding Unit Award was issued. This award consists of the ribbon-only to the Secretary of Transportation Outstanding Achievement Medal, mounted in a gold frame.

The Secretary of Transportation Outstanding Unit Award was awarded for two periods of service to Coast Guard Units and personnel. The first was to all Coast Guard Active Duty Personnel, Reservists, Civilians, and Auxiliarists for participation in an extended period of migrant interdiction as well as natural and environmental disasters from October 1, 1993 to September 30, 1994. The second period of service was for Coast Guard Activities New York–Guarding Liberty Task Force from September 11, 2001 to October 22, 2001. This period qualifies for the Operational Distinguishing Device.

Since the transfer of the Coast Guard to the Department of Homeland Security, the Secretary of Transportation Outstanding Unit Award has only been bestowed twice. The first was in 2006 when President George W. Bush awarded it to the United States Merchant Marine Academy for all of the work the midshipmen performed in assisting with the transportation of servicemen and supplies in the years following the September 11, 2001 attack on the World Trade Center. The second occurred in 2022 when Secretary Pete Buttigieg awarded it to the United States Merchant Marine Academy midshipmen who were in attendance between March 13, 2020 and June 18, 2022. The second case was due to the regiment of midshipmen’s leadership and relentless efforts to excel on campus, but more importantly for manning the ships during the logistical crisis caused by the COVID-19 pandemic.

== See also ==
- Awards and decorations of the United States Coast Guard
- Awards and decorations of the United States government
