= Operational Distinguishing Device =

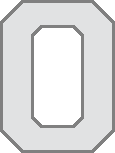
- Type: Ribbon device
- Awarded for: Direct participation in missions of an operational "hands on" nature.
- Country: United States of America
- Presented by: the Department of Homeland Security
- Eligibility: Coast Guard personnel
- Coast Guard Achievement Medal with Operational Distinguishing Device ("O" device)

The Operational Distinguishing Device ("O" device) is a miniature silver 5/16 inch letter "O" that is authorized by the United States Coast Guard as a ribbon device which may be authorized for wear on certain awards and decorations of the United States Coast Guard.

The "O" device is either centered on the suspension and service ribbon of the medal or unit award ribbon, or to the middle-right if there are an even number of letter devices on the ribbon. Any authorized gold 5/16 Inch Stars alternate around the "O" device. The first star is placed to the wearer’s right of the "O" device and the second star is placed to wearer's left of the "O" device. Only one "O" device may be worn per ribbon.

Eligibility criteria are based on a member's or unit's direct participation in missions of an operational "hands on" nature. To qualify for this device on a decoration, both the person's work and unit must be operational in nature.

Such examples include search and rescue, fire fighting, maritime law enforcement, disaster relief, pollution response, and aids to navigation maintenance and operations.

The decision to authorize an Operational Distinguishing Device is made by the award approving authority, giving a wide discretion as to what actions may qualify.

== Authorized awards ==
The Operational Distinguishing Device may be authorized for wear on the following awards:

Personal awards

- Meritorious Service Medal
- Coast Guard Commendation Medal
- Coast Guard Achievement Medal
- Commandant's Letter of Commendation Ribbon

Unit awards

- Coast Guard Unit Commendation
- Coast Guard Meritorious Unit Commendation
- Coast Guard Meritorious Team Commendation

== See also ==
- Awards and decorations of the United States military
- United States military award devices
