= Coast Guard Bicentennial Unit Commendation =

Unit award of the US Coast Guard

- Type: Unit award
- Awarded for: "[F]or an extraordinary level of service to the government and citizens of the United States for 200 years and in particular from March 1989 through October 1989."
- Presented by: United States Coast Guard
- Eligibility: Service with the Coast Guard from March 1989 to October 1989.
- Status: No longer awarded
- Established: 2 January 1990

Precedence
- Next (higher): Air and Space Organizational Excellence Award
- Next (lower): Prisoner of War Medal

The Coast Guard Bicentennial Unit Commendation was a unit award of the United States Coast Guard which was awarded to all active, reserve, auxiliary, and civilian personnel of the Coast Guard who served satisfactorily for any period between June 4, 1989 and August 4, 1990.

The award was issued only to those whose service up to the issuance date was honorable and it could be issued to members of other services who were assigned to the Coast Guard and served in that period.

Wearing of the ribbon was stipulated to be placed after the Air and Space Organizational Excellence Award and before the Prisoner of War Medal.

== One-time award ==
Established by Commandant of the Coast Guard Admiral Paul A. Yost, Jr. on 2 January 2 1990. The award was issued as a one-time award only that commemorated the founding of the U.S. Coast Guard in 1790, then known as the Revenue Cutter Service. The Coast Guard Bicentennial Unit Commendation was discontinued for issuance in September 1991, but Coast Guard regulations permit the continued wearing of the decoration on the uniforms of Coast Guard members who have earned it.
