= Coast Guard "E" Ribbon =

Award of the United States Coast Guard

- Type: Ribbon
- Awarded for: "[A] Coast Guard cutter which earns the Operational Excellence Award during annual refresher training."
- Presented by: the Department of Homeland Security
- Eligibility: Military Unit
- Status: Currently awarded
- First award: 1990
- Final award: On going

Precedence
- Next (higher): Army: Superior Unit Award; Naval Service: Navy Meritorious Unit Commendation; Air and Space Forces: Air and Space Outstanding Unit Award; Coast Guard: Meritorious Team Commendation
- Equivalent: Naval Service: Navy "E" Ribbon; Air and Space Forces: Air and Space Organizational Excellence Award
- Next (lower): Coast Guard Bicentennial Unit Commendation

The Coast Guard "E" Ribbon was established in September 1990 and is the United States Coast Guard equivalent to the Navy "E" Ribbon.

Also known as the Coast Guard Excellence Ribbon, the decoration is a unit award which is presented to the officers and crew of any Coast Guard cutter which earns the Operational Excellence Award during annual refresher training.

Subsequent awards for the Coast Guard "E" Ribbon are denoted by a gold star.

== See also ==
- Awards and decorations of the United States military
