= Coast Guard Distinguished Service Medal =

United States Coast Guard distinguished service medal

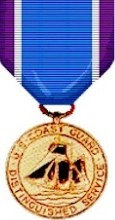
- Type: Military medal Distinguished service medal
- Awarded for: Distinguished and exceptionally meritorious service in a duty of great responsibility.
- Presented by: United States Department of Homeland Security
- Eligibility: United States Coast Guardsmen
- Status: Currently awarded
- Established: 4 August 1949
- First award: 1961
- Service ribbon

Precedence
- Next (higher): Department of Defense: Defense Distinguished Service Medal; Department of Homeland Security: Homeland Security Distinguished Service Medal
- Equivalent: Army: Distinguished Service Medal; Naval Service: Navy Distinguished Service Medal; Air and Space Forces: Air Force Distinguished Service Medal
- Next (lower): Silver Star Medal

The Coast Guard Distinguished Service Medal (CGDSM) is a military decoration of the United States Coast Guard that was established 4 August 1949 and is presented to coast guardsmen for "Exceptionally meritorious service to the government in a duty of great responsibility." Prior to this date, members of the Coast Guard were eligible to receive the Navy Distinguished Service Medal. The Homeland Security Distinguished Service Medal, which replaced the Transportation Distinguished Service Medal in 2002, is another higher precedence Distinguished Service Medal that may be awarded to coast guardsmen. The Coast Guard Distinguished Service Medal is equivalent to the Army's Army Distinguished Service Medal, Naval Service's Navy Distinguished Service Medal, and the Air and Space Forces' Air Force Distinguished Service Medal.

== Criteria ==
The Coast Guard Distinguished Service Medal is awarded to coast guardsmen who distinguish themselves by exceptionally meritorious service to the United States Government in a duty of great responsibility. The medal may also be awarded to members of the uniformed services of the United States who distinguish themselves while working with the U.S. Coast Guard. The exceptional performance of duty must be clearly above what is normally expected and must have contributed materially to the success of a major command or project. The decoration is typically awarded to senior flag officers, such as the commandant of the Coast Guard. However, this does not preclude the award of the medal to any person who meets the eligibility requirements.

The bestowing authority of the Coast Guard Distinguished Service Medal is the secretary of homeland security. Prior to 2003, the award was authorized by the secretary of transportation, and prior to 1967, it was authorized by the secretary of the treasury.

=== Devices ===
Additional awards of the CGDSM are denoted by 5/16 inch gold stars.

== Notable recipients ==
- Admiral Jonathan Greenert - Chief of Naval Operations
- Admiral Alfred C. Richmond, first recipient of the medal, 1961
- General Richard Myers, Chairman of the Joint Chiefs of Staff
- General Peter Pace, Chairman of the Joint Chiefs of Staff, 2005
- General Norman Schwarzkopf Jr., Commander of Operation Desert Storm, 1991
- General Eric Shinseki US Army Chief of Staff
- General Colin Powell Chairman of the Joint Chiefs of Staff
- Master Chief Petty Officer of the Coast Guard Rick Trent, first enlisted recipient of the medal, 1998
- Master Chief Petty Officer of the Coast Guard Vincent W. Patton III
- Master Chief Petty Officer of the Coast Guard Frank A. Welch
- Master Chief Petty Officer of the Coast Guard Charles W. Bowen
- Master Chief Petty Officer of the Coast Guard Michael P. Leavitt

== See also ==
- Awards and decorations of the United States military
