= Special Operations Service Ribbon =

Coast Guard Special Operations Service Ribbon
- Special Operations Service Ribbon
- Type: Individual award ribbon
- Awarded for: Significant numbers of personnel participating in a major Coast Guard operation of a special nature, not involving combat
- Presented by: the U.S. Department of Homeland Security
- Eligibility: Coast Guard Personnel and certain other uniformed individuals
- Status: Currently awarded
- First award: 1 July 1987

Precedence
- Next (higher): Military Outstanding Volunteer Service Medal
- Next (lower): Coast Guard Sea Service Ribbon

The Special Operations Service Ribbon is a service award of the United States Coast Guard which was first created 1 July 1987 by order of Commandant of the Coast Guard, Admiral Paul A. Yost Jr. The award is authorized for certain acts of non-combat meritorious service, for which no other service medal or ribbon is authorized.

The four main areas of eligibility, for the presentation of the Special Operations Service Ribbon, are listed as follows:

- Coast Guard operations of a special nature involving multiple agency involvement pertaining to national security or law enforcement.
- Coast Guard operations of a special nature in support of special events drawing large media interest and public attention.
- Coast Guard operations or involvement with foreign government in all areas of saving life and property at sea.
- Coast Guard operations of assistance for friendly and/or developing nations.

Initially a one-time award precluded from the use of service stars, multiple awards of the Special Operations Service Ribbon are now denoted by service stars.

The Commandant of the Coast Guard has also periodically authorized award of the Special Operations Service Ribbon to certain warships, aviation squadrons and other selected units of the U.S. Navy, primarily for support of USCG-led counter-narcotics (CN) and drug interdiction operations and to U.S. Navy and U.S. Air Force units assisting in search-and-rescue and/or natural disaster operations in partnership with the U.S. Coast Guard.

== See also ==
- Awards and decorations of the United States military
