= Meritorious Team Commendation =

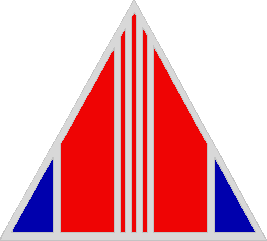
- Service ribbon and civilian lapel pin for the Meritorious Team Commendation
- Type: Unit award
- Awarded for: "[D]isplay cohesion and teamwork noticeable to upper echelon commanders."
- Country: United States
- Presented by: the Department of Homeland Security
- Eligibility: Coast Guard units and teams
- Status: Currently awarded
- Established: 22 December 1993
- Meritorious Team Commendation service ribbon for three awards, at least one of which for operational service.

Precedence
- Next (higher): Army, Naval Service, and Coast Guard: Meritorious Unit Commendations; Air and Space Forces: Meritorious Unit Award
- Next (lower): Army: Superior Unit Award; Naval Service: Navy "E" Ribbon; Air and Space Forces: Air and Space Outstanding Unit Award; Coast Guard: Coast Guard "E" Ribbon

The Meritorious Team Commendation (MTC) is a unit award of the United States Coast Guard. Created on 22 December 1993, the Meritorious Team Commendation is awarded for performance of exceptional actions that would normally warrant a Commandant's Letter of Commendation if recognizing an individual. Recognized groups must also display cohesion and teamwork noticeable to upper echelon commanders. The MTC is awarded to groups or teams that are not identifiable by OPFAC (Operating Facility Address Code) as a United States Coast Guard unit. The MTC may be awarded to military personnel, Coast Guard Auxiliarists, and civilians.

== Appearance ==
The ribbon is primarily scarlet in color, with Old Glory Blue edges 9/64 in (3.6 mm) wide. In the center there are four white stripes 1/16 in (1.6 mm) wide, spaced 1/32 in (0.79 mm) apart.

For civilians there is a lapel pin that is awarded in lieu of a service ribbon. The lapel pin is in the shape of an isosceles triangle 5/8 in (16 mm) wide with a height of 9/16 in (14 mm). The pin is nickel plated with red and blue enameled surfaces referencing the pattern of the service ribbon.

Additional awards of the Meritorious Team Commendation are denoted by award stars with the award authorized to all Team Coast Guard units. For those Coast Guard commands who are awarded the Meritorious Team Commendation under field operating conditions, the Operational Distinguishing Device is authorized.
