= Charles W. Bowen =

10th Master Chief Petty Officer of the Coast Guard

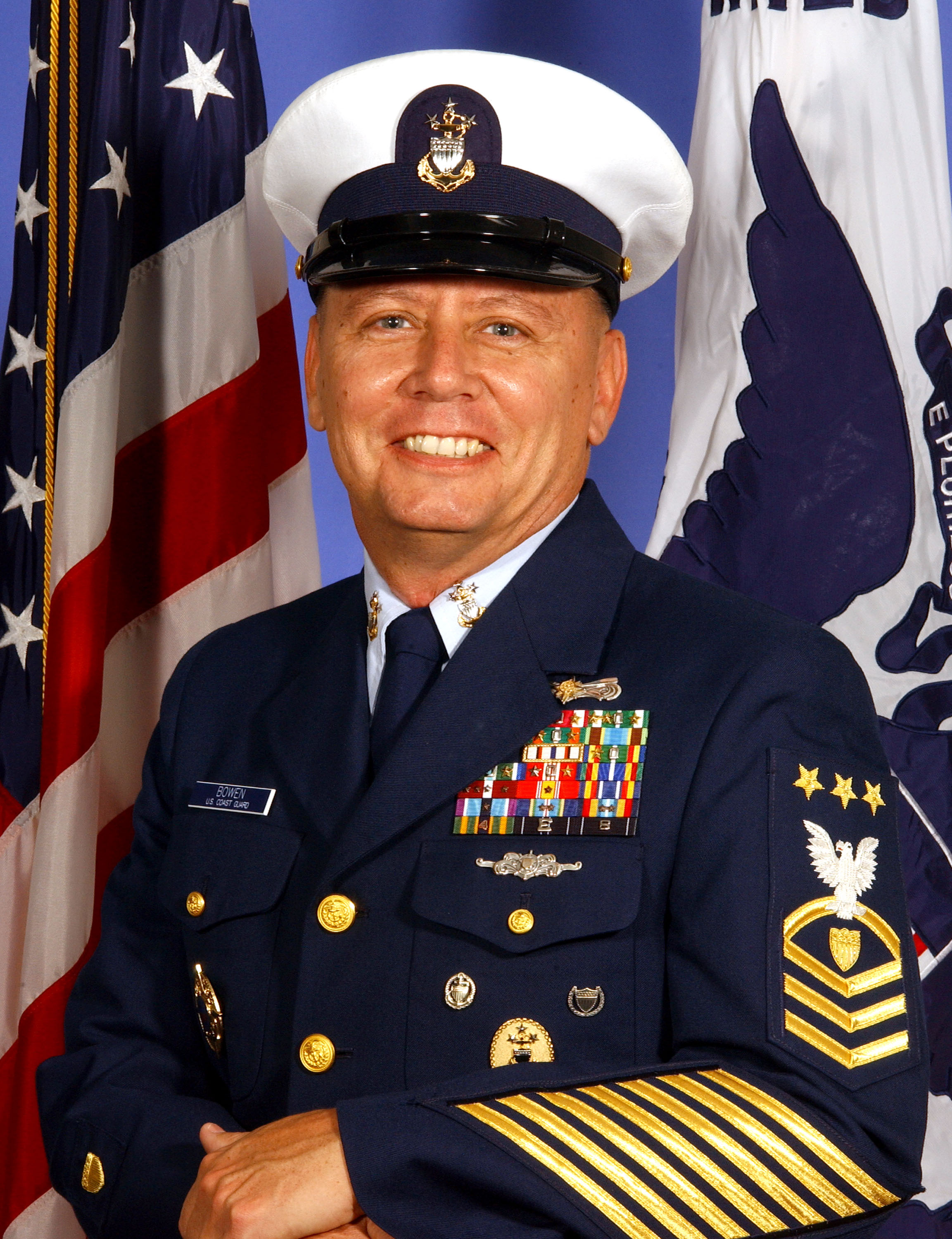
- MCPOCG Charles "Skip" W. Bowen
- Military career
- Allegiance: United States of America
- Branch: United States Coast Guard
- Service years: 1978–2010
- Rank: Master Chief Petty Officer of the Coast Guard
- Nickname: "Skip"
- Awards: Coast Guard Distinguished Service Medal; Meritorious Service Medal (4 awards); Coast Guard Commendation Medal (4 awards); Coast Guard Achievement Medal (3 awards)

Charles W. "Skip" Bowen was the tenth Master Chief Petty Officer of the Coast Guard (MCPOCG). He assumed the position from MCPOCG Frank A. Welch on June 14, 2006, and was relieved on May 21, 2010, by Michael P. Leavitt. Bowen was previously assigned as the Officer-in-Charge of Coast Guard Station Marathon.

== Education ==
Education
	U. S. Army Sergeants Major Academy
BSc	Excelsior University
MBA	Touro University International
	Project Management Institute

== Coast Guard Career ==
After attending basic training at Coast Guard Station Cape May in Cape May, New Jersey in 1978, his first duty station was to a patrol boat, USCGC Point Swift in Clearwater, Florida. From there he was assigned to Coast Guard Station Marathon in the Florida Keys just in time for the Mariel boatlift in 1980. A subsequent assignment at Station Fort Pierce, Florida, was followed by another patrol boat, this time the newly commissioned USCGC Farallon, homeported in Miami. From south Florida, he travelled to the Mid-Atlantic seaboard to join USCGC Point Arena as the Executive Petty Officer. Upon advancing to Chief Petty Officer he was assigned as the Officer-in-Charge of Coast Guard Station New Haven, in June 1990. Following a successful tour at New Haven, he was transferred to Station Sand Key in Clearwater Beach, Florida in 1994.

In 1997, Bowen was assigned as the Officer-in-Charge of the USCGC Point Turner in Newport, Rhode Island, until her decommissioning in April 1998. During May 1998 he was assigned as the Officer-in-Charge of USCGC Hammerhead, based in Woods Hole, Massachusetts; this cutter was the first of the high-tech 87-foot (27 m) patrol boats on the east coast.

From 1999 to 2001, Bowen served as the Seventh District Command Master Chief. In May 2002, Bowen graduated with distinction from the United States Army Sergeants Major Academy. While at the academy, he was selected as one of the few non-Army students to serve as a class vice president. Upon graduation, he was awarded the prestigious "William G. Bainbridge Chair of Ethics Award." From June 2002 to June 2004, Bowen served as the Command Master Chief of the Headquarters Units. In addition to those duties, he served as the Interim Master Chief Petty Officer of the Coast Guard from July 2002 through October 2002.

== Awards and decorations ==
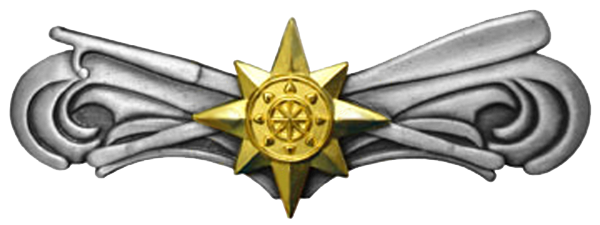
- Advanced Boat Force Operations Insignia
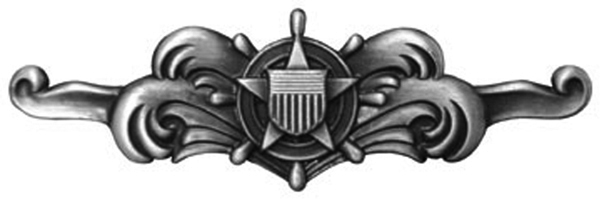
- Cutterman Insignia
- Officer-in-Charge Afloat Pin
- Officer-in-Charge Ashore Pin
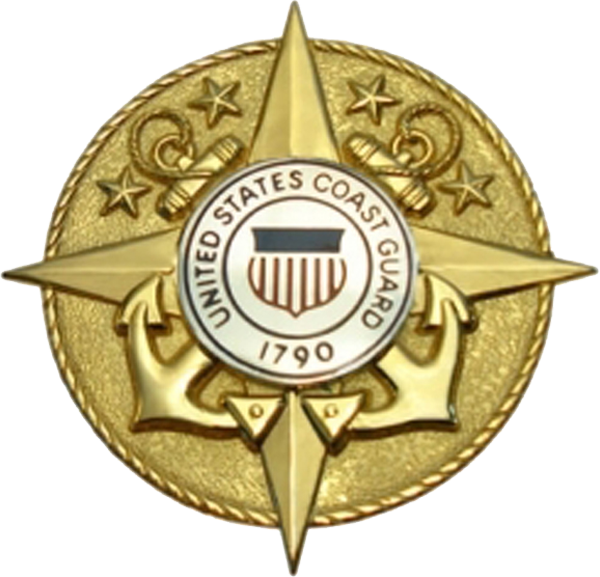
- Commandant Staff Badge
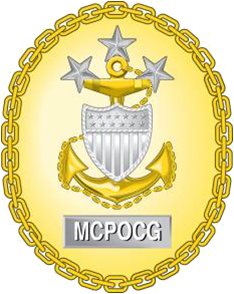
- Master Chief Petty Officer of the Coast Guard

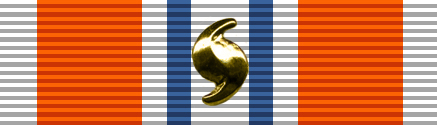
Coast Guard Distinguished Service Medal
Meritorious Service Medal with 3 gold award stars and "O" device
Coast Guard Commendation Medal with 3 gold award stars and "O" device
Coast Guard Achievement Medal with 2 gold award stars and "O" device
Commandant's Letter of Commendation
Coast Guard Presidential Unit Citation with "hurricane symbol"
Secretary of Transportation Outstanding Unit Award
Coast Guard Unit Commendation with award star and "O" device
Coast Guard Meritorious Unit Commendation with 1 silver and 2 gold award stars and "O" device
Meritorious Team Commendation with silver and gold award star and "O" device
Coast Guard Bicentennial Unit Commendation
Coast Guard Good Conduct Medal with 1 silver and 4 bronze service stars
National Defense Service Medal with 1 service star
Global War on Terrorism Service Medal
Humanitarian Service Medal with service star
Special Operations Service Ribbon with 2 service stars
Sea Service Ribbon with 2 service stars
Non-Commissioned Officer Professional Development Ribbon with bronze award numeral 4
Expert Rifle Marksmanship Medal
Pistol Marksmanship Ribbon with silver sharpshooter device

- 8 Service stripes.

== Personal ==
Bowen's educational accomplishments include a Bachelor of Science Degree magna cum laude from Excelsior University and a Master of Business Administration summa cum laude from Touro University International.

== Post Coast Guard career ==
In April 2011, Bowen went to work at Bollinger Shipyards, in Lockport, Louisiana. Bowen's first position at Bollinger was to manage the Sentinel building program.

In August 2012 Bowen was promoted to vice president for Government Relations.

Military offices
Preceded by Frank A. Welch	Master Chief Petty Officer of the Coast Guard; 2006–2010	Succeeded by Michael P. Leavitt
