= Charles L. Calhoun =

1st Master Chief Petty Officer of the Coast Guard

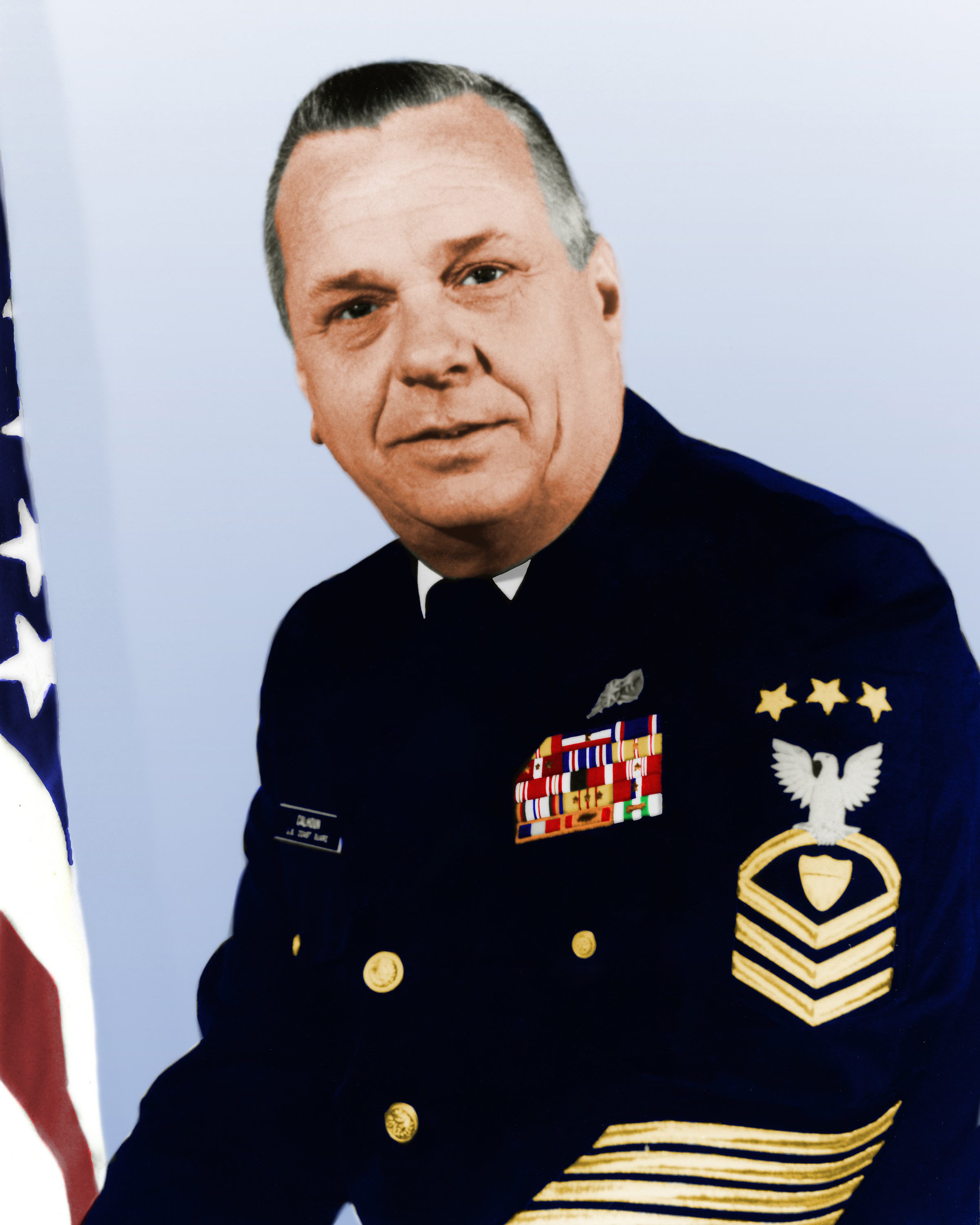
- Charles Calhoun
- Born: April 20, 1925; Ocean City, Maryland, U.S.
- Died: February 24, 2002 (aged 76); Santa Rosa, California, U.S.
- Military career
- Allegiance: United States of America
- Branch: United States Navy; United States Coast Guard
- Service years: 1943–1946 (Navy); 1946–1973 (Coast Guard)
- Rank: Torpedoman Second Class (Navy); Master Chief Petty Officer of the Coast Guard
- Conflicts: World War II; Vietnam War
- Awards: Legion of Merit; Commandant's Letter of Commendation Ribbon; Combat Action Ribbon; Navy Presidential Unit Citation

Charles Luther Calhoun (April 20, 1925 – February 24, 2002) was an American military enlisted man who served briefly in the United States Navy during World War II and then in the United States Coast Guard, where he would rise to become the first Master Chief Petty Officer of the Coast Guard.

== Biography ==
Charles Calhoun was born April 20, 1925, in Ocean City, Maryland, and lived very close to the coast throughout his childhood. His grandfather was a commercial fisherman who taught Calhoun how to fish as a boy. He joined the United States Navy in 1943 at the age of 17 and was trained as a torpedoman. He served on the USS Lunga Point in the Pacific Ocean theater of World War II. He participated in many of the bloodiest battles of the theater, including the battles of Leyte Gulf, Luzon, Iwo Jima, and Okinawa. The Lunga Point's crew received the Presidential Unit Citation and the Navy Unit Commendation for "extraordinary heroism and action against enemy Japanese forces in the air, ashore, and afloat" following a kamikaze attack on the ship. Calhoun was honorably discharged from the Navy on February 21, 1946.

=== Coast Guard ===
Calhoun returned to Ocean City and worked in the post office for a short period, but enlisted in the United States Coast Guard with a friend on September 20, 1946. He enlisted at the rank of Boatswain's Mate Second Class due to his Navy experience. His first assignment was to a small station in Ocean City. There he saved a man who had fallen from a jetty into the water and broken his hip. Calhoun was awarded the Commandant's Letter of Commendation Ribbon for the rescue. He would later serve with Coast Guard Squadron One aboard the USCGC Point Orient during the Vietnam War. The cutter sighted and fought enemies on her first patrol, making the Point Orient the first Coast Guard cutter to fire shots in the Vietnam War.

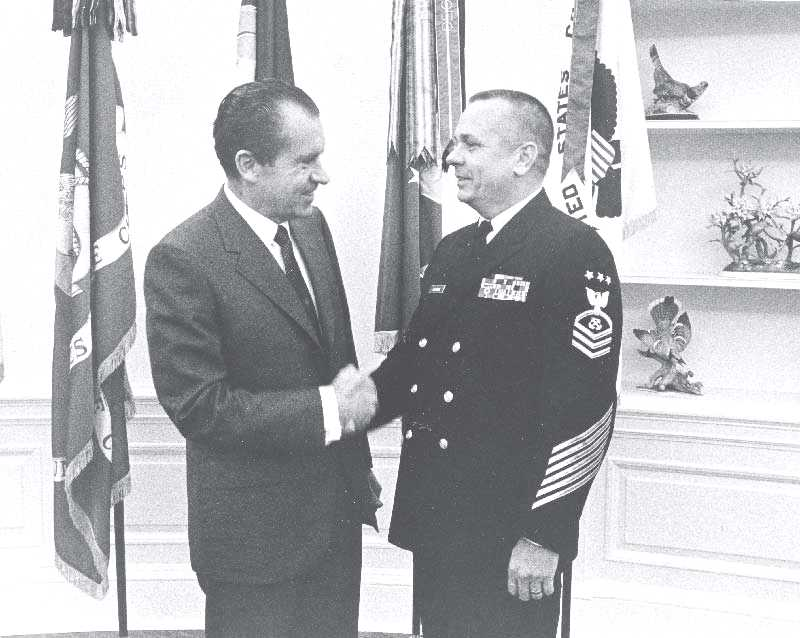
Calhoun meeting with President Richard Nixon

Calhoun learned of the creation of the new office, Master Chief Petty Officer of the Coast Guard (MCPOCG), while working as a career counselor. Calhoun sent in an application for the job, and centered his application essay on his belief that the office should be used to promote communication between enlisted sailors and their command. He was accepted and was made the first MCPOCG by then-Commandant of the Coast Guard Willard J. Smith on August 27, 1969. He undertook numerous projects during his tenure in the office, including working on the board that led to the creation of the Cutterman Insignia, implementing a program of local advisors who reported to the MCPOCG office to hear enlisted personnel issues, and beginning the movement towards the Coast Guard wearing their own style of uniform rather than Navy uniforms with a few defining patches and pins. Calhoun retired from the MCPOCG position on August 1, 1973. He later died in Santa Rosa, California, on February 24, 2002.

== Awards and decorations ==
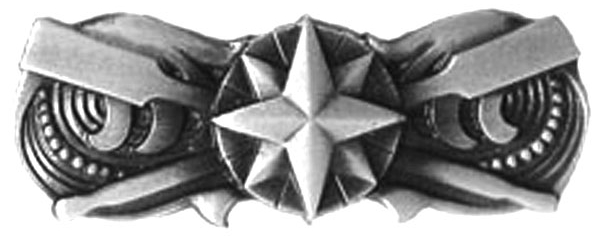

Badge	Coxswain Insignia		
1st row	Legion of Merit | Commandant's Letter of Commendation Ribbon		
2nd row	Combat Action Ribbon	Navy Presidential Unit Citation with one bronze service star	Navy Unit Commendation
3rd row	Coast Guard Good Conduct Medal with 1 silver service star	American Campaign Medal	Asiatic-Pacific Campaign Medal with 2 bronze service stars
4th row	World War II Victory Medal	Navy Occupation Service Medal	National Defense Service Medal with 1 bronze service star
5th row	Armed Forces Expeditionary Medal	Vietnam Service Medal with 3 bronze campaign stars	Philippine Presidential Unit Citation
6th row	Vietnam Gallantry Cross Unit Citation	Philippine Liberation Medal with 1 bronze campaign star	Vietnam Campaign Medal

- 7 gold service stripes.

== Legacy ==
In October 2019, the current Master Chief Petty Officer of the Coast Guard Jason M. Vanderhaden announced that Commandant of the Coast Guard Admiral Karl L. Schultz had selected Charles L. Calhoun as the namesake for the tenth National Security Cutter USCGC Calhoun.

Military offices
Preceded by Position Created	Master Chief Petty Officer of the Coast Guard; 1969–1973	Succeeded by Philip F. Smith
