= Allen Thiele =

5th Master Chief Petty Officer of the Coast Guard

Allen William Thiele
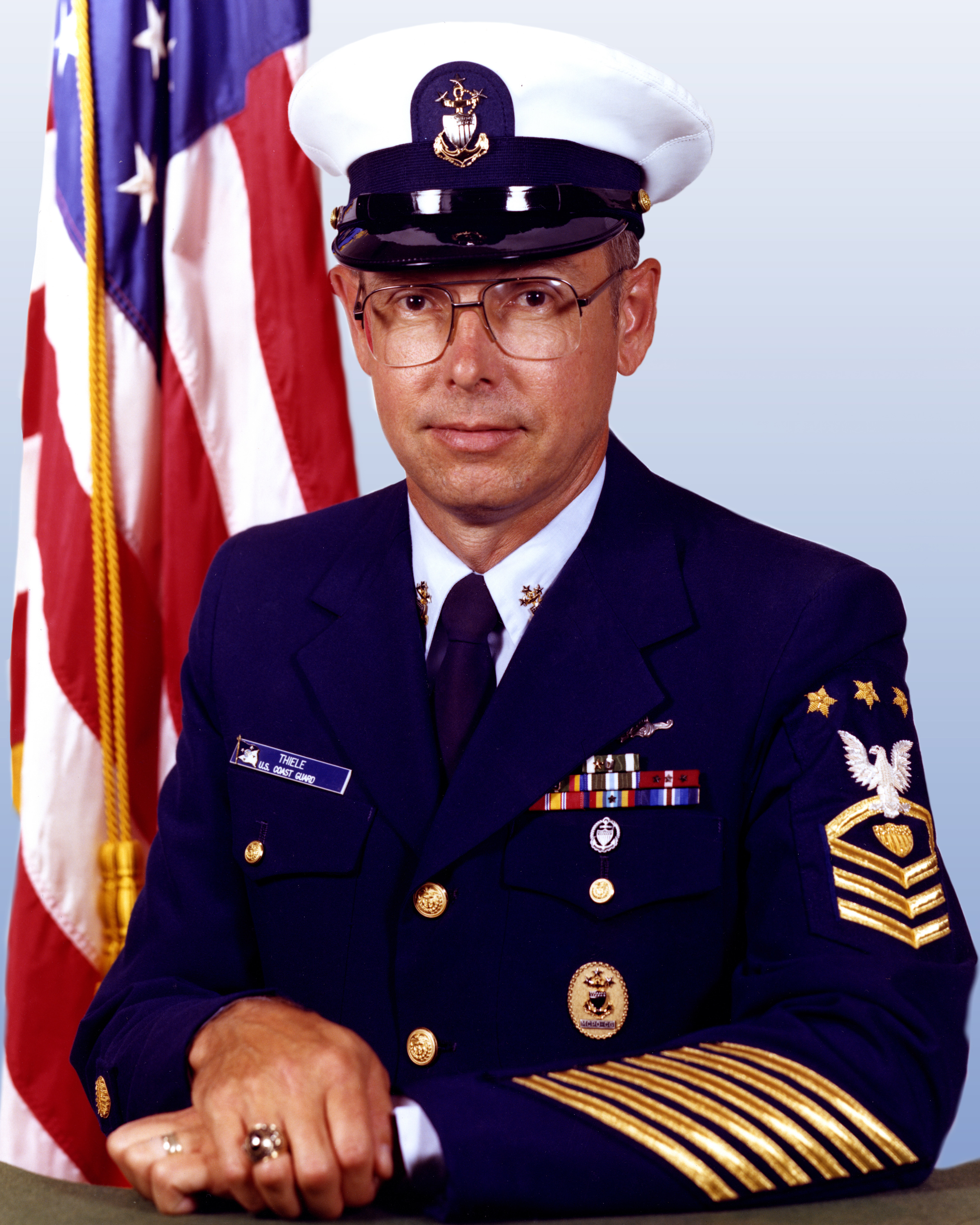
- MCPOCG Allen Thiele
- Born: May 28, 1940; Manitowoc, Wisconsin, U.S.
- Died: September 23, 2017 (aged 77); Washington Island, Wisconsin, U.S.
- Military career
- Allegiance: United States of America
- Branch: United States Coast Guard
- Service years: 1958–1990
- Rank: Master Chief Petty Officer of the Coast Guard

Allen William Thiele (May 28, 1940 – September 23, 2017) was the fifth Master Chief Petty Officer of the Coast Guard, serving from 1986 to 1990.

== Career ==
Thiele enlisted in the Coast Guard in Green Bay, Wisconsin in 1958. After completing basic training in Cape May, New Jersey, he was stationed in New Orleans, Louisiana. In 1959, he was transferred to the Philippines.

After returning to the United States, he was stationed at Coast Guard Stations in Algoma, Wisconsin and Plum Island, Wisconsin and aboard USCGC Mesquite (WLB-305). He was then officer-in-charge of the Boating Safety Detachment in Two Rivers, Wisconsin.

In 1969, Thiele was stationed at Coast Guard Station Kauaʻi, Hawaii as executive petty officer. He then served aboard USCGC Owasco (WHEC-39) until 1973. In 1976, he was assigned as officer-in-charge of the recruiting office in Milwaukee, Wisconsin.

In 1979, Thiele became command enlisted advisor of the Fourteenth Coast Guard District. He was then officer-in-charge of USCGC Wyaconda (WLR-75403) from 1982 until 1986, when he became Master Chief Petty Officer of the Coast Guard. Thiele retired in 1990.

Awards he received during his career include the Legion of Merit, the Joint Service Commendation Medal, the Coast Guard Commendation Medal with Operational Distinguishing Device and award star, the Commandant's Letter of Commendation Ribbon, the Coast Guard Unit Commendation with Operational Distinguishing Device, the Coast Guard Meritorious Unit Commendation, the Coast Guard Bicentennial Unit Commendation, the Coast Guard Good Conduct Medal with silver and three bronze service stars, the National Defense Service Medal, the Coast Guard Sea Service Ribbon with two service stars, the Restricted Duty Ribbon and the Cutterman Insignia.

Master Chief Thiele died on September 23, 2017, at Washington Island, Wisconsin. The lead ship in the new Chief Petty Officer class of inland construction tenders USCGC Allen Thiele (WLIC-1601) will be named in his honor.
