= Robert C. Parker =

United States Coast Guard admiral

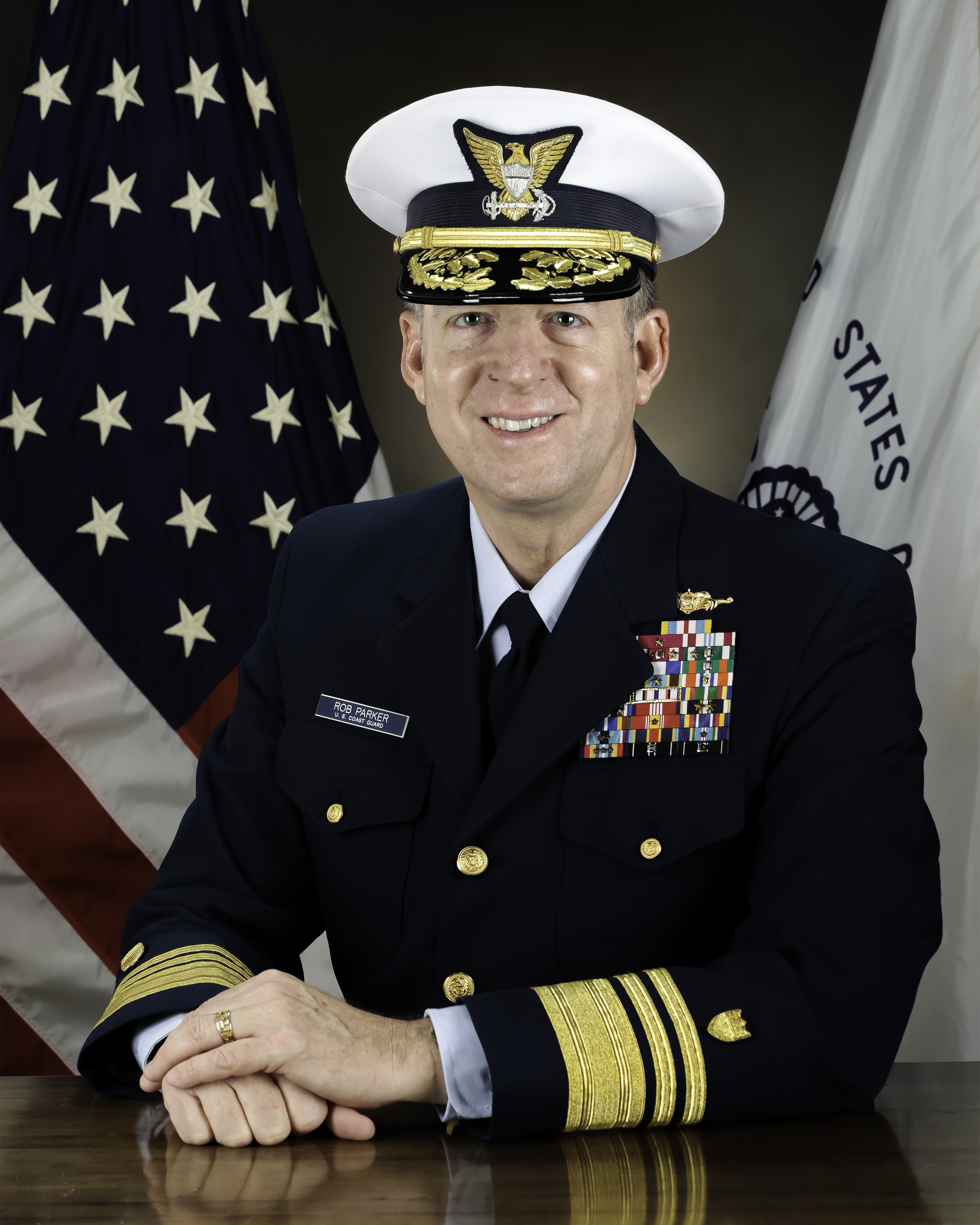
- Born: September 7, 1957 (age 69)
- Military career
- Allegiance: United States of America
- Branch: United States Coast Guard
- Rank: Vice Admiral
- Awards: Cutterman Insignia; Coast Guard Distinguished Service Medal (1); Defense Superior Service Medal (1); Legion of Merit (2) Meritorious Service Medal; Coast Guard Commendation Medal (2); Coast Guard Achievement Medal

Vice Admiral Robert Charles Parker (born September 7, 1957) is a retired officer of the United States Coast Guard.

== Coast Guard career ==
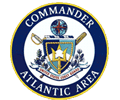

Vice Admiral Robert C. Parker assumed the duties as Commander, Coast Guard Atlantic Area in April 2010, where he serves as the operational commander for all U.S. Coast Guard missions from the Rocky Mountains to the Persian Gulf, spanning across five Coast Guard Districts and 40 states. He concurrently serves as Commander, Defense Force East and provides Coast Guard mission support to the Department of Defense and Combatant Commanders. Before assuming command of LANTAREA, Vice Admiral Parker served as the U.S. Southern Command's first Director of Security and Intelligence in Miami, Florida. He was promoted to Flag rank in July 2006 and was assigned as the Assistant Commandant for Capabilities in Washington, DC.

Vice Admiral Parker has over 12 years of sea duty, including three commands. His assignments ashore have included: Operations Center Duty Officer for the Twelfth Coast Guard District and Pacific Area in Alameda, California; Security Assistance Liaison Officer in Monrovia, Liberia; Professional Development Branch Chief at the U. S. Coast Guard Academy, New London, Connecticut; Chief, Pacific Area Operational Forces Branch in Alameda; Chief of Operations, Eleventh Coast Guard District in Alameda; and Chief of Staff, Thirteenth Coast Guard District in Seattle, Washington.

== Education ==
Robert Parker is a 1979 graduate of the U. S. Coast Guard Academy. Additionally, he holds a Master of Arts degree in National Security and Strategic Studies from the U. S. Naval War College. He also completed a one-year National Security Fellowship at the John F. Kennedy School of Government at Harvard University in 1999.

== Retirement ==
On Friday, May 16, 2014, VADM Parker was relieved as Commander, Coast Guard Atlantic Area by VADM William "Dean" Lee at a change of command and retirement ceremony held at Naval Station Norfolk, Virginia. VADM Parker subsequently retired from active duty.

== Awards and decorations ==
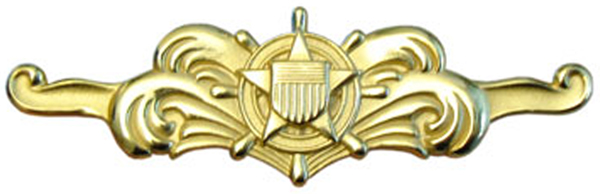
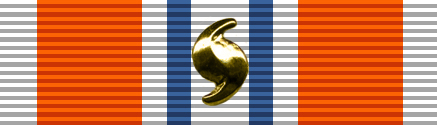
Cutterman Insignia
	Coast Guard Distinguished Service Medal
	Defense Superior Service Medal
	Legion of Merit with two gold award stars
	Meritorious Service Medal with two gold award stars and Operational Distinguishing Device
	Coast Guard Commendation Medal with three gold award stars and "O" device
	Coast Guard Achievement Medal with "O" device
	Commandant's Letter of Commendation Ribbon with two gold award stars and Operational Distinguishing Device
	Coast Guard Presidential Unit Citation
	Secretary of Transportation Outstanding Unit Award
[[Image:|80px|alt=]]	Coast Guard Unit Commendation
	Coast Guard Meritorious Unit Commendation with five award stars and "O" device
	Meritorious Team Commendation
	Coast Guard "E" Ribbon
	Coast Guard Bicentennial Unit Commendation
	National Defense Service Medal with two bronze service stars
	Global War on Terrorism Service Medal
	Humanitarian Service Medal with three service stars
