= Frank A. Welch =

American maritime officer (1960–2026)

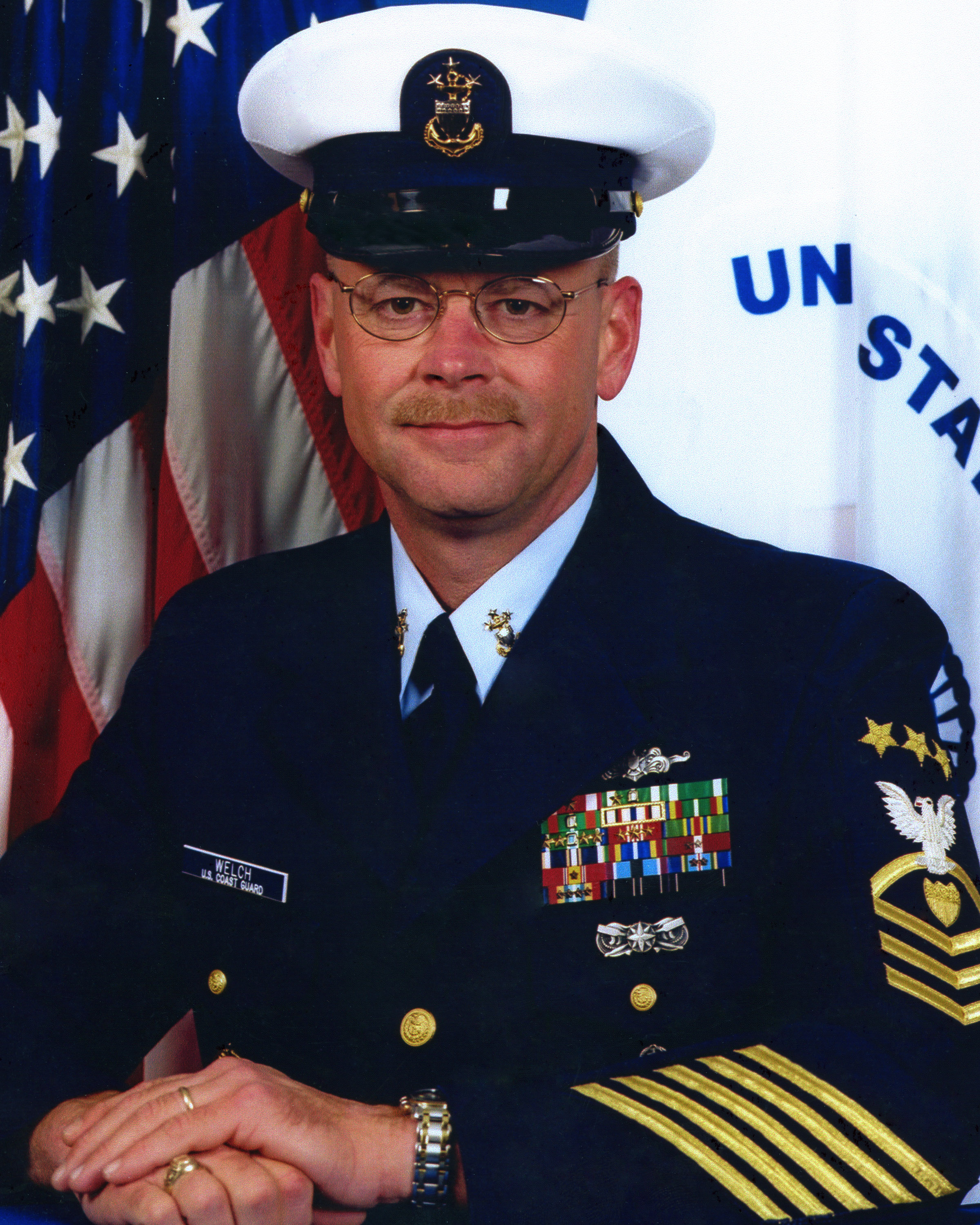
- MCPOCG Frank A. Welch
- Born: October 22, 1960; Wichita Falls, Texas, U.S.
- Died: June 25, 2026 (aged 65); Spotsylvania, Virginia, U.S.
- Military career
- Allegiance: United States of America
- Branch: United States Coast Guard
- Service years: 1980—2006
- Rank: Master Chief Petty Officer of the Coast Guard

Franklin Alvin Welch (October 22, 1960 – June 25, 2026) was an American maritime officer who was the ninth Master Chief Petty Officer of the United States Coast Guard. He entered the Coast Guard in 1980 after graduating from Shades Valley High School Class of 1978, in Birmingham, Alabama. A Master Chief Quartermaster, Welch served in office from October 10, 2002, to June 14, 2006, and served in the Coast Guard for over 26 years.

== Career ==
On October 10, 2002, Welch assumed his duties as the ninth Master Chief Petty Officer of the Coast Guard. In his most recent assignment, Welch served as Officer-in-Charge of USCGC Sockeye, homeported at Station Bodega Bay, California. His first operational task aboard Sockeye was to command her through an initial homeport transit of 6,000 nautical miles (11,000 km) from New Orleans, Louisiana, to her homeport of Bodega Bay. Prior to this assignment, Welch served as Officer-in-Charge, USCGC Point Chico, and was also homeported at Bodega Bay.

Advancing quickly, Welch served in the Coast Guard for 26 years; thirteen of which were as a Master Chief Petty Officer. He has a diverse background in Coast Guard operations. He has served aboard USCGC Sweetbrier in Cordova, Alaska, where he devoted his off-duty time striking the Quartermaster rating; Aids to Navigation Team Bristol, Rhode Island, as operations and aids to navigation petty officer; USCGC Harriet Lane as assistant navigator and deck watch officer; USCGC Vigorous as assistant navigator and deck watch officer; Fleet Training Unit, U.S. Atlantic Fleet as underway navigation and visual communications instructor and training liaison officer; and aboard USCGC Galveston Island, homeported in Apra Harbor, Guam, as executive petty officer. Welch also served as "Gold Badge" Command Master Chief for the Ninth Coast Guard District, Cleveland, Ohio, where he represented the enlisted men and women of the "Great Lakes," and as Master Chief of the Coast Guard Chief Petty Officer Academy in Petaluma, California. Welch was designated as a Master Training Specialist by Commander, Training Command, U.S. Atlantic Fleet where he also received the Coast Guardsman of the Year Award for 1991. In August 2002, he received the Northern California Senior Enlisted Person of the Year (Operational) award sponsored by the United States Navy League.

Welch attended many specialized training courses during his career, including the Coast Guard Chief Petty Officer Academy, where he was the president of Class XXVI.

He earned the permanent Cutterman Insignia, Coxswain, Command Master Chief, Chief Petty Officer Academy, and Officer in Charge Afloat pins. His military awards include the Coast Guard Distinguished Service Medal, three Meritorious Service Medals, two Coast Guard Commendation Medals with "O" device, the Navy Commendation Medal, the Coast Guard Achievement Medal with "O" device, the Commandant's Letter of Commendation Ribbon with "O" device, two Coast Guard Unit Commendations with "O" device, five Coast Guard Meritorious Unit Commendations with "O" device, four Meritorious Team Commendation ribbons, the Navy Meritorious Unit Commendation, the Coast Guard Bicentennial Unit Commendation ribbon, seven Coast Guard Good Conduct Medals, two National Defense Service Medals, the Global War on Terrorism Service Medal, the Humanitarian Service Medal, three Special Operations Service Ribbons, five Coast Guard Sea Service ribbons, and the Coast Guard Rifle and Pistol Marksmanship ribbons.

Master Chief Charles (Skip) W. Bowen assumed the duties as the tenth Master Chief Petty Officer of the Coast Guard on June 14, 2006, in a ceremony held at the USCG Telecommunications and Information Systems Command (TISCOM). Welch died in Spotsylvania on June 25, 2026, at the age of 65.

== Personal life ==
Welch, a native of Texas, was married to Mari Lynn Perry of Newport, Rhode Island. They lived in Spotsylvania, Virginia.

== Awards and decorations ==
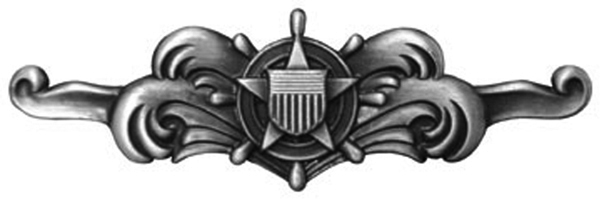
- Cutterman Insignia
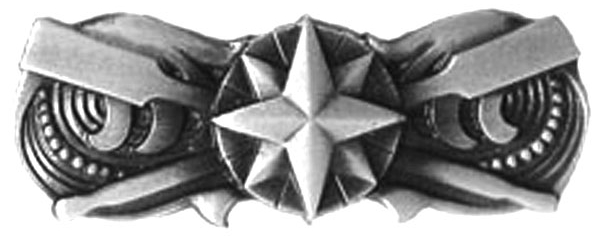
- Coxswain Insignia
- Officer-in-Charge Afloat Pin
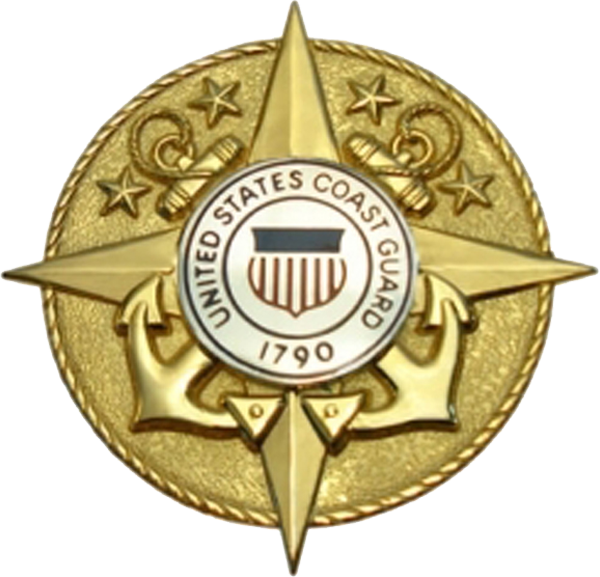
- Commandant Staff Badge
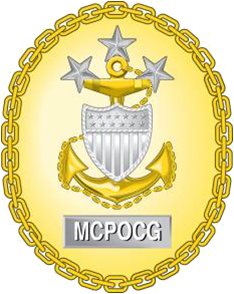
- Master Chief Petty Officer of the Coast Guard
- Coast Guard Distinguished Service Medal
- Meritorious Service Medal with one gold award star
- Coast Guard Commendation Medal with "O" device and award star
- 6 gold Service stripes.

Military offices
Preceded by Vincent W. Patton III	Master Chief Petty Officer of the Coast Guard; 2002—2006	Succeeded by Charles W. Bowen
