= R. Jay Lloyd =

6th Master Chief Petty Officer of the Coast Guard

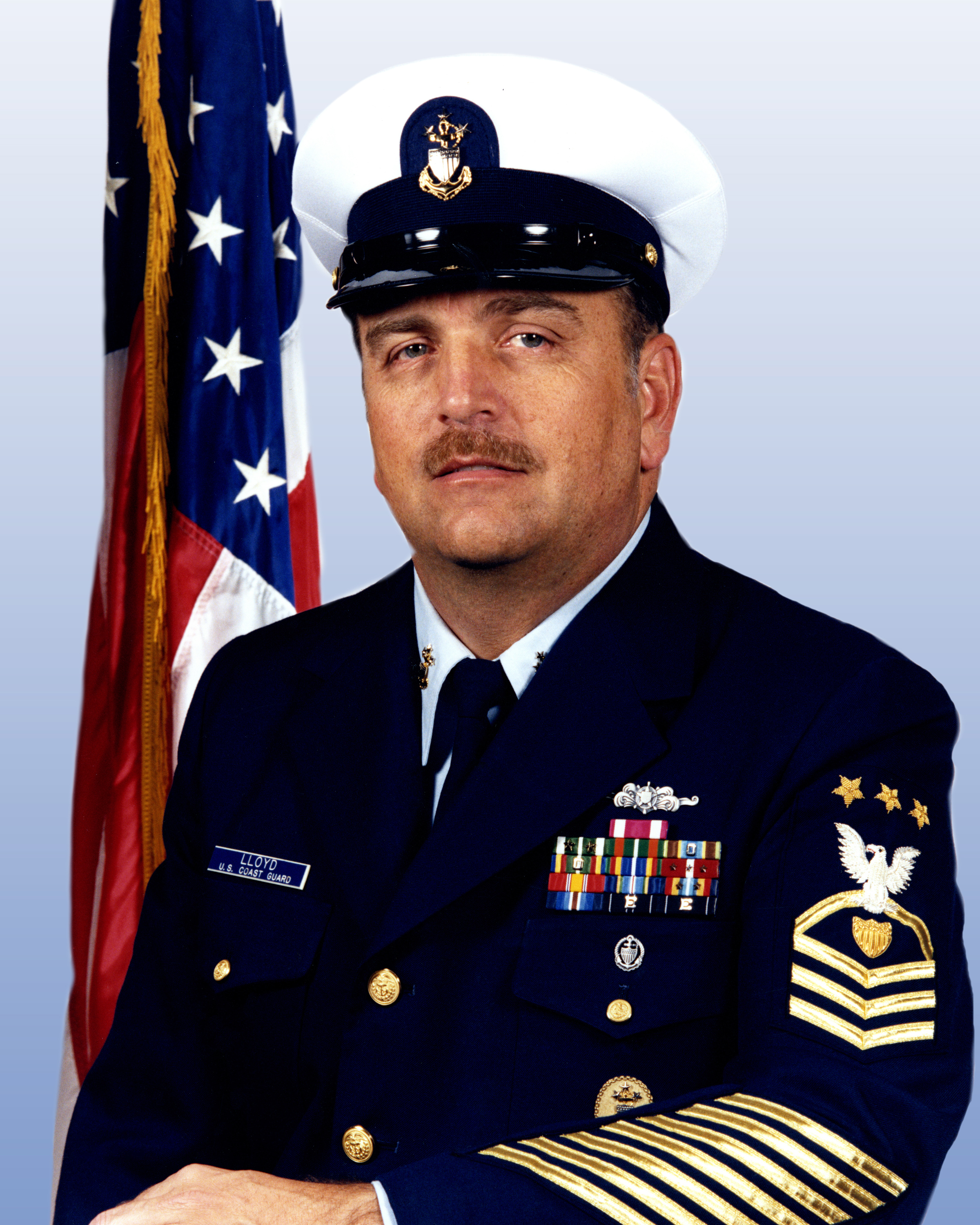
- MCPOCG R. Jay Lloyd
- Born: 1943 or 1944 (age 82–83)
- Military career
- Allegiance: United States of America
- Branch: United States Coast Guard
- Service years: 1961–1994
- Rank: Master Chief Petty Officer of the Coast Guard; Master Chief Boatswain's Mate

Robert Jay Lloyd (born 1945/1946) was the sixth Master Chief Petty Officer of the Coast Guard, serving as the enlisted advisor to the Commandant of the Coast Guard, from 1990 to 1994.

A Coast Guard veteran of 33 years, Lloyd served as Officer in Charge of USCG Point Bennett in Port Townsend, Washington; USCGC Point Winslow in Eureka, California; and Coast Guard Station Cortez in Cortez, Florida. He also served as Executive Petty Officer at Loran Station Anguar Palau, Western Carolina Islands and Coast Guard Station Willapa Bay, Washington. His seagoing experience included assignments on board USCGC Point Hope, Sabine, TX; USCGC Barataria, Alameda, California; USCGC Confidence, Kodiak, Alaska; and USCGC Cape Carter, Crescent City, California. Earlier in his career, Lloyd served at the Fourteenth Coast Guard District Office, Honolulu, Hawaii; Coast Guard Reserve Unit Denver, Colorado; and Coast Guard Base Alameda, California.

On June 29, 1990, Lloyd became the sixth Master Chief Petty Officer of the Coast Guard. Prior to his selection, he served as Command Enlisted Advisor of the Seventeenth Coast Guard District in Juneau, Alaska. He had also previously served as Command Enlisted Advisor for the Eighth Coast Guard District, New Orleans, Louisiana.

Lloyd attended more than a dozen specialized training courses during his career. He is a graduate of the United States Army Sergeants Major Academy; United States Coast Guard Senior Petty Officer Leadership and Management School, and Defense Equal Opportunity Management Institute. He also has a Bachelor of Arts and Master of Arts degree in history from New Mexico State University.

His military awards include two Legion of Merit Medals, Meritorious Service Medal, three Coast Guard Commendation Medals, Coast Guard Achievement Medal, Commandant's Letter of Commendation with "O" device, two Coast Guard Unit Commendation's with "O" device, Bicentennial Unit Commendation, eight Coast Guard Good Conduct Awards, National Defense Service Medal with Bronze Star, Humanitarian Service Medal, Coast Guard Sea Service Ribbon, Coast Guard Restricted Duty Ribbon, Coast Guard Expert Rifleman Medal, and Coast Guard Expert Pistol Shot Medal. He is a member of the advisory board of VetJobs.

Military offices
Preceded by Allen Thiele	Master Chief Petty Officer of the Coast Guard; 1990–1994	Succeeded by Eric A. Trent
