= USCGC Calhoun =

Legend-class cutters of the United States Coast Guard

USCGC Calhoun (WMSL-759)
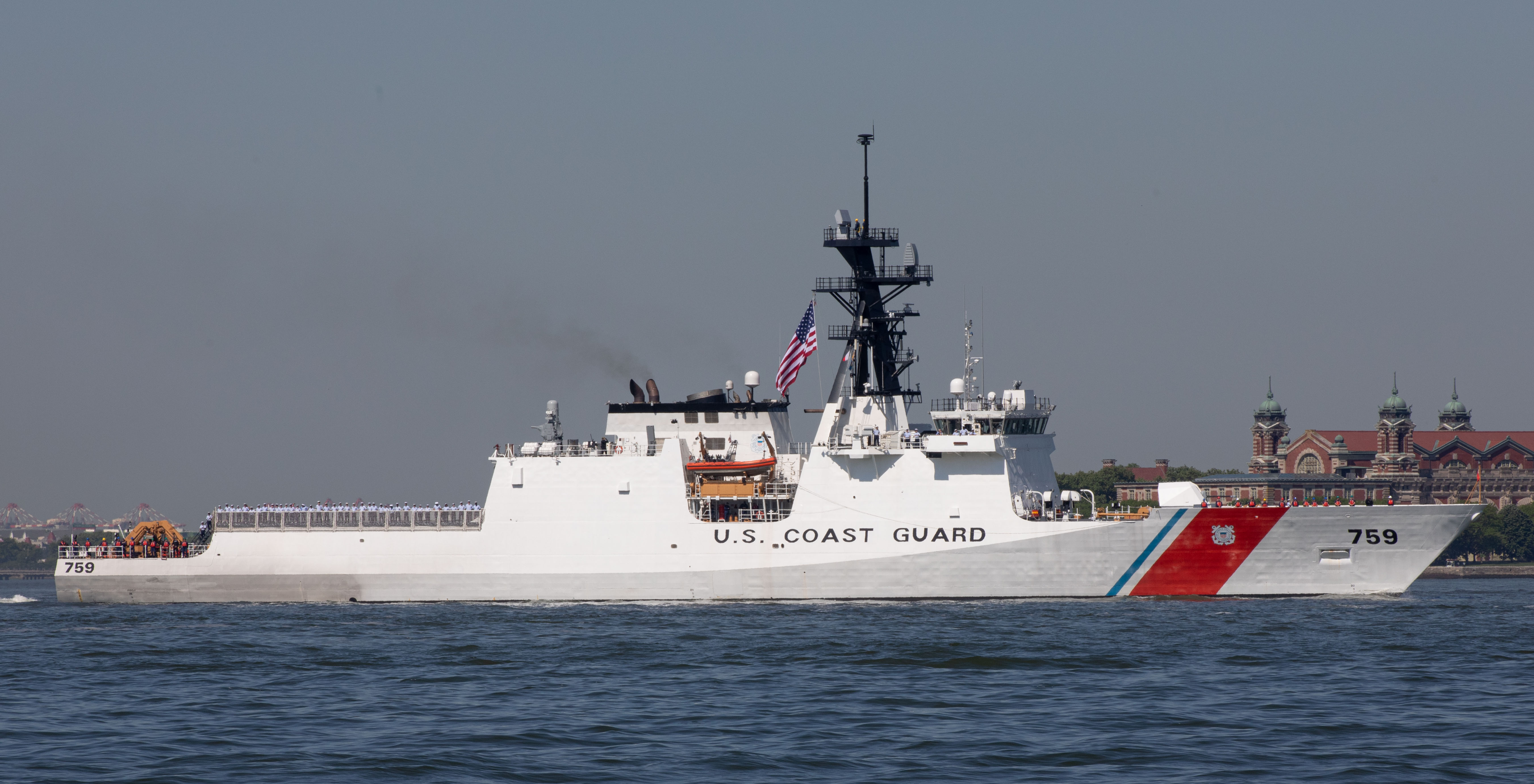

History

United States
- Name: Calhoun
- Namesake: Charles L. Calhoun
- Awarded: 21 December 2018
- Builder: Huntington Ingalls Industries, Pascagoula, Mississippi
- Cost: $499.76 million
- Laid down: 23 July 2021
- Launched: 2 April 2022
- Sponsored by: Christina Calhoun Zubowicz
- Christened: 4 June 2022
- Commissioned: 20 April 2024
- Home port: North Charleston, South Carolina
- Identification: Pennant number: WMSL-759
- Motto: "Never Give Up"
- Status: in active service
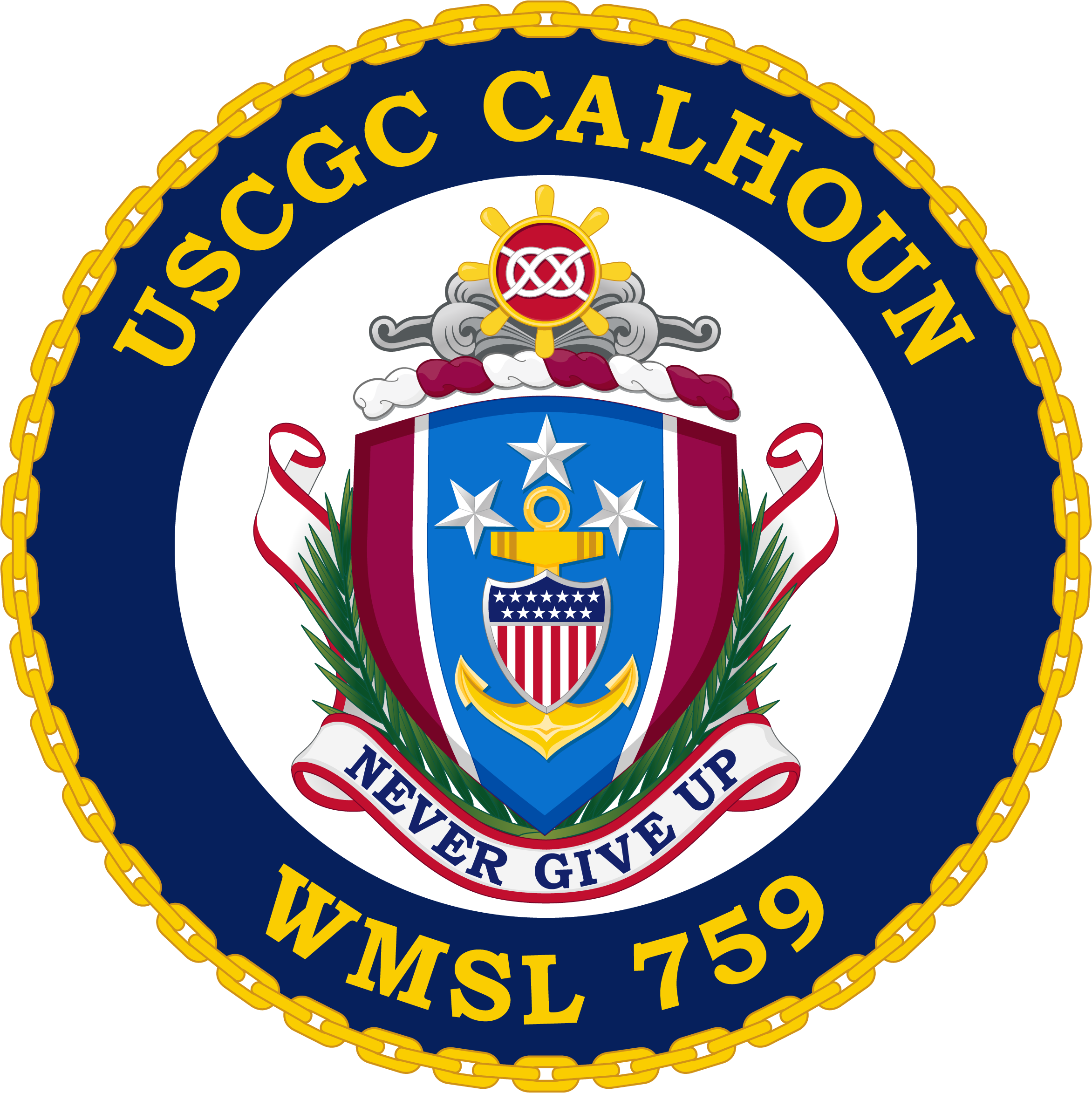
- Badge

General characteristics
- Class & type: Legend-class cutter
- Displacement: 4,500 long tons (4,600 t)
- Length: 418 ft (127 m)
- Beam: 54 ft (16 m)
- Draft: 22.5 ft (6.9 m)
- Propulsion: Combined diesel and gas
- Speed: 28 knots (52 km/h; 32 mph)
- Range: 12,000 nmi (22,000 km; 14,000 mi)
- Endurance: 60 to 90-day patrol cycles
- Complement: 120
- Sensors & processing systems: AN/SPS-75 air search radar; SPQ-9B fire control radar; AN/SPS-79 surface search radar
- Electronic warfare & decoys: AN/SLQ-32 electronic warfare system; 2 x Mk-36 SRBOC/ 2 x Mk-53 NULKA countermeasures chaff/rapid decoy launcher
- Armament: 1 x Mk-110 57 mm Naval Gun System (variant of the Bofors 57 mm gun); 1 × 20 mm Block 1B Phalanx close-in weapons system; 4 × .50 caliber machine guns; 2 × M240B 7.62 mm machine guns
- Armor: Ballistic protection for main gun
- Aircraft carried: 2 x MH-65C Dolphin MCH, or 1 x MH-65C Dolphin MCH and 2 x sUAS

USCGC Calhoun (WMSL-759) is the tenth Legend-class cutter of the United States Coast Guard. She is the first ship to be named after Charles L. Calhoun, the first Master Chief Petty Officer of the Coast Guard.

== Development and design ==
All of Legend-class cutters were constructed by Huntington Ingalls Industries and were part of the Integrated Deepwater System Program. They are of the high endurance cutter roles with additional upgrades to make it more of an asset to the Department of Defense during declared national emergency contingencies. The cutters are armed mainly to take on lightly armed hostiles in low-threat environments.

== Construction and career ==
Calhoun and her sister ship Friedman were ordered on 21 December 2018. On 12 November 2019, 100 tons of her steel had been cut. As of July 2021, she was more than halfway through her construction schedule. After the planned ceremony was delayed in 2020, her keel was formally authenticated on 23 July 2021. Calhoun was launched on 2 April 2022 and christened on 4 June 2022. Ingalls Shipbuilding announced on 2 August 2023 that Calhoun completed her acceptance sea trials. Calhoun was delivered to Coast Guard Base Charleston and commissioned on 20 April 2024.
