= Philip F. Smith =

2nd Master Chief Petty Officer of the Coast Guard

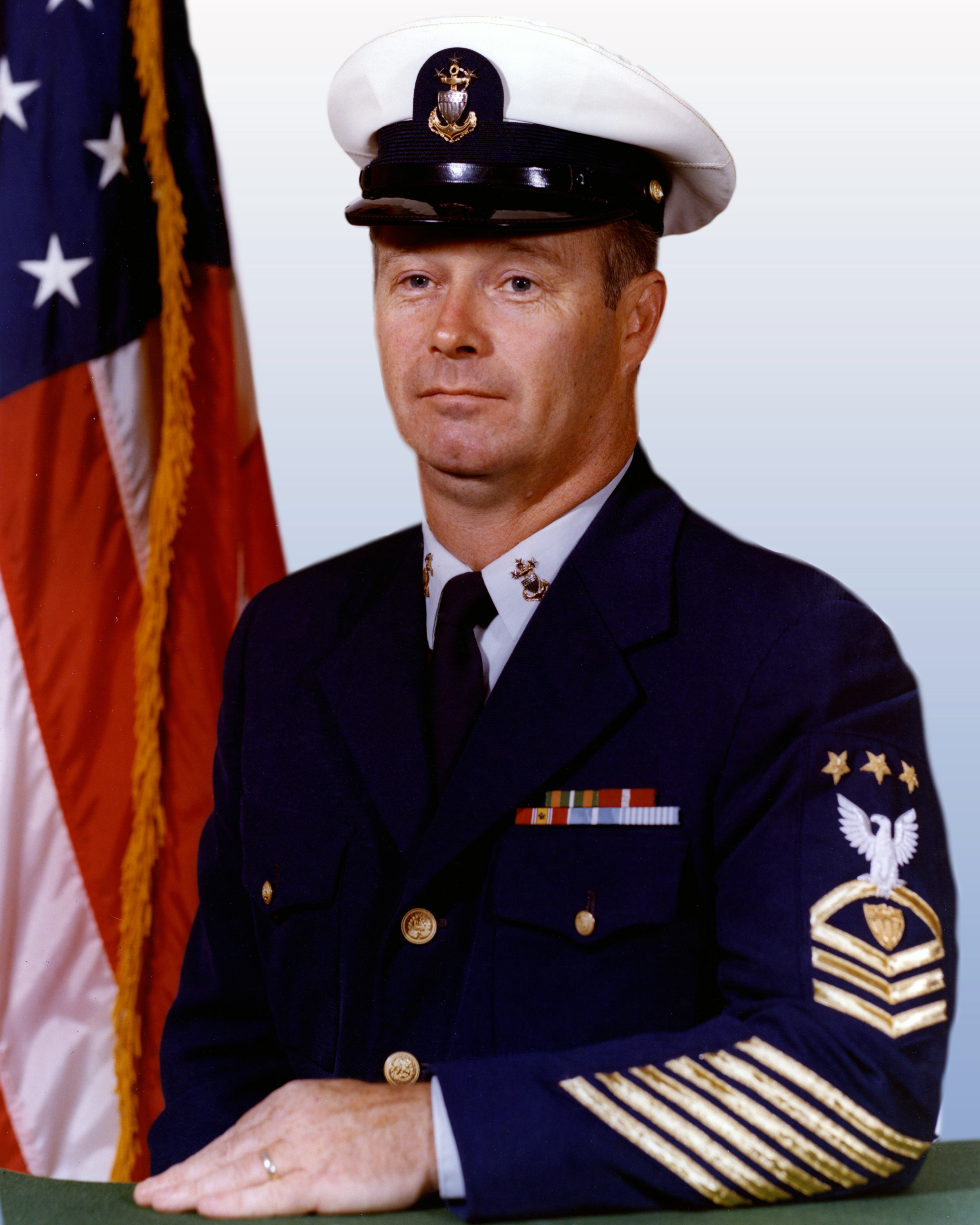
- MCPOCG Philip F. Smith
- Born: August 23, 1932; Brooklyn, New York, U.S.
- Died: June 22, 2017 (aged 84); Seattle, Washington, U.S.
- Military career
- Allegiance: United States of America
- Branch: United States Coast Guard
- Service years: 1949—1977
- Rank: Master Chief Petty Officer of the Coast Guard; Master Chief Yeoman
- Awards: Coast Guard Good Conduct Medal, National Defense Service Medal, United Nations Service Medal, Korean Service Medal

Philip Francis Smith (August 23, 1932 – June 22, 2017) was the second Master Chief Petty Officer of the Coast Guard, serving as the enlisted advisor to the Commandant of the Coast Guard, from 1973 to 1977.

Smith became the Master Chief Petty Officer of the Coast Guard on August 1, 1973, succeeding Charles Calhoun. He enlisted in the Coast Guard on September 20, 1949, and after recruit training served aboard USCGC Rhododendron, homeported at Seattle, Washington. After attending yeoman school at the Coast Guard Training Center at Groton, Connecticut in 1950, he returned to Seattle to serve in the operations division, Thirteenth Coast Guard District. Following a tour of sea duty aboard USCGC Bering Strait homeported at Honolulu, Hawaii from September 1952 to May 1954, he returned again to Seattle to serve as yeoman in the personnel division of the Thirteenth District office.

Later tours of duty included the Marine Inspection Office, Guam, Coast Guard Air Station Port Angeles Washington, the personnel division at the Seventeenth Coast Guard District office, Juneau, Alaska, Coast Guard Air Station San Diego, California, and the personnel division of the Eleventh Coast Guard District office at Long Beach, California. From March 1968 to March 1969, he served aboard USCGC Staten Island, homeported at Seattle. He then returned to the personnel division in the Thirteenth Coast Guard District. He was promoted to the rating of master chief yeoman on July 1, 1966. While serving his last tour of duty at Seattle, Smith was selected as the second Master Chief Petty Officer of the Coast Guard by the Commandant of the Coast Guard, Admiral Chester R. Bender. His service medals and awards include the Coast Guard Good Conduct Medal with silver star, National Defense Service Medal with bronze star, United Nations Service Medal, Korean Service Medal.

Master Chief Smith died on June 22, 2017, in Seattle, Washington.

== Awards and decorations ==

Coast Guard Achievement Medal		Coast Guard Good Conduct Medal with silver award star
National Defense Service Medal with bronze award star	Korea Service Medal	United Nations Service Medal

Military offices
Preceded by Charles L. Calhoun	Master Chief Petty Officer of the Coast Guard; 1973–1977	Succeeded by Hollis B. Stephens
