= Legend-class cutter =

United States Coast Guard cutter class

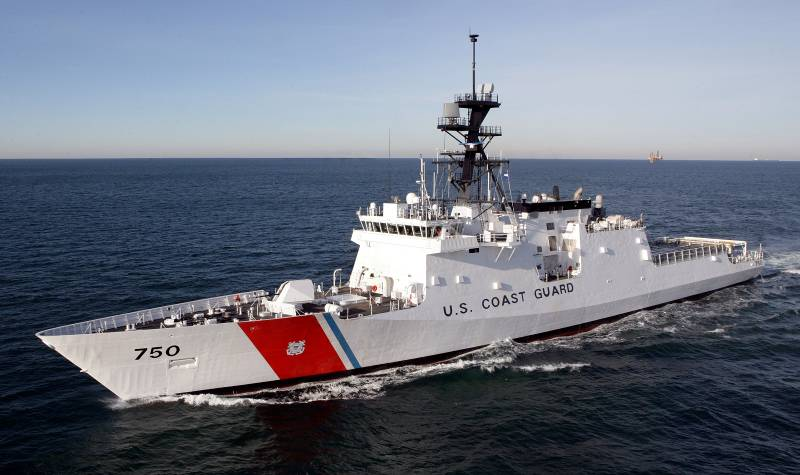
- USCGC Bertholf, the first National Security Cutter

Class overview
- Builders: Ingalls Shipbuilding
- Operators: United States Coast Guard
- Preceded by: Hamilton class
- Subclasses: FF(X)
- Cost: $670m(average), $735m(FY13 ship)
- In commission: 2008–present
- Planned: 10 (Option for 12)
- Building: 0
- Completed: 10
- Canceled: 1
- Active: 10

General characteristics
- Type: United States Coast Guard Cutter / Large patrol vessel
- Displacement: 4,600 long tons (4,700 t)
- Length: 418 feet (127 m)
- Beam: 54 feet (16 m)
- Draft: 22.5 feet (6.9 m)
- Installed power: 3 × Caterpillar 3512B diesel generators
- Propulsion: Combined diesel and gas turbine; 2 × 7,400 kW (9,900 hp) MTU 20V 1163 diesels; 1 × 22 MW (30,000 hp) GE LM2500 gas turbine engine
- Speed: Over 28 knots (52 km/h; 32 mph)
- Range: 12,000 nautical miles (22,000 km; 14,000 mi)
- Endurance: 60–90-day cycles
- Complement: 113 (14 officers + 99 enlisted) and can carry up to 148 depending on mission
- Sensors & processing systems: EADS 3D TRS-16 AN/SPS-75 Air Search Radar; SPQ-9B Fire Control Radar; AN/SPS-79 Surface Search Radar; AN/SLQ-32B(V)2; AN/UPX-29A IFF; AN/URN-25 TACAN; Mk 46 Mod 1 Optical Sighting System (WMSL 750 - 753); Mk 20 Mod 0 Electro-Optical Sighting System (WMSL 754 - 760); Furuno X and S-band radars; Sea Commander Combat System; Link-11 and Link-16 tactical data links
- Electronic warfare & decoys: AN/SLQ-32B(V)2 Electronic Warfare System; 2 × SRBOC/ 2 × Nulka countermeasures chaff/rapid decoy launchers
- Armament: 1 × Mk 110 57mm gun, a variant of the Bofors 57 mm gun and Gunfire Control System; 1 × 20 mm Block 1B Baseline 2 Phalanx Close-In Weapons System; 4 × crew-served .50 caliber (12.7 mm) Browning M2 machine guns; 2 × crew-served M240B 7.62 mm machine guns; Designed for but not with additional weapons and sensors
- Armor: Ballistic protection for main gun
- Aircraft carried: 1 × MH-65C Dolphin MCH and 2 × sUAS
- Aviation facilities: 50-by-80-foot (15 m × 24 m) flight deck, hangar for all aircraft

The Legend-class cutter, also known as the National Security Cutter (NSC) and Maritime Security Cutter, Large, is the largest active patrol cutter class of the United States Coast Guard, the size of a frigate. Entering into service in 2008, the Legend class is the largest of several new cutter designs developed as part of the Integrated Deepwater System Program.

== Mission ==
These vessels can be used for a variety of tasks, including environmental protection, search and rescue, fisheries protection, ports, waterways, and coastal security, counterterrorism activities, law enforcement, drug interdiction, defense operations, and other military operations, including assigned naval warfare tasks with the U.S. Navy.

== Design ==
The Legend-class cutters are the second-longest of all U.S. Coast Guard cutters, behind the research icebreaker Healy, and replaced the 12 Hamilton-class cutters in service. These cutters are envisioned by the Coast Guard as being able to undertake the entire range of the high-endurance cutter roles, with additional upgrades to make it more of an asset to the Department of Defense during declared national emergency contingencies. To facilitate intercept missions, the Legend class can carry and launch the Short Range Prosecutor and the Long Range Interceptor rigid-hulled inflatable boats (RHIBs). The cutters are configured to survive in low-threat environments, such as an enemy having a poorly equipped military, some coastal patrol craft, and few to no anti-ship cruise missiles.

Operations in this environment can be general defense operations, including theater security, port protection, ship escort, anti-piracy, and maritime interception operations. The cutters can survive in medium-threat environments, which can include a fairly well equipped military of ships and aircraft with weapons and radar coverage well offshore, higher numbers of anti-ship cruise missiles, and a possible submarine threat. Operations in this threat environment could include defense operations, naval surface fire support, and the evacuation of noncombatants. The cutters are not expected to survive in a high-threat environment with their current configuration.

The cutter has a rear-launching ramp, capable of launching and retrieving the two aft-stored RHIBs while underway. The NSC is built to about 90% military standards. The NSC has a steel hull and steel superstructure with steel bulkheads. Ballistic protection is provided for the main gun. The cutter's crew-served weapons can have steel ballistic shields attached for protection. The NSC is equipped with a state-of-the-art damage-control system, that contributes to the ship's survivability.

The NSC is designed to U.S. Navy damage stability criteria and to level-1 survivability standards. Most of the NSC design is compatible with ABS naval vessel rules. The NSC has a degaussing capability. The cutters have a reduced radar cross-section, which gives the cutters a higher degree of stealth over the past cutters. The NSC uses a modified version of the same stealthy mast design as the Arleigh Burke-class destroyers.

=== Combat suite ===
Legend-class cutters have increased data exchange bandwidth. The Hensoldt, formerly EADS North America, TRS-3D radar system provides three-dimensional air and surface search functions, and is used in the LCS program and as the German Korvette 130 program. The cutters are equipped with the AN/SLQ-32(V)2 electronic warfare system, used in the DDG-51 class. The cutters AN/SLQ-32B(V)2 system is to be upgraded under the Surface Electronic Warfare Improvement Program (SEWIP).

The Legend class is equipped with the same 220 rpm Mk 110 Bofors 57 mm gun as mounted on the U.S. Navy's littoral combat ships and Constellation-class frigates. Guided 57 mm ammunition is being developed for the Mk 110 for the Navy and Coast Guard, including for use on the National Security cutters. The missile defense duties are handled by the Mk 53 Nulka decoy systems, the Mk 36 SRBOC countermeasure systems also used on the FFG-7 and CG-47 programs, and the Phalanx CIWS. The combination of the Mk 110 and the Phalanx gives the cutters anti-surface capability, limited air-defense capability, and the capability to provide naval gunfire support.

The cutters have space, weight, and power reserved for additional weapons and systems, which includes mine-warfare systems, non-line-of-sight missiles, and can have a SeaRAM replace the 20 mm Phalanx CIWS. The NSC is capable of carrying a sonar that is reported as having mine and underwater swimmer location ability. The NSC has an NBC detection and defense system to repel chemical, biological, or radiological attacks and has wash-down systems. The cutter's weapons, command and control suite can be upgraded and is hardened to survive potential attacks and process increased data flow.

== History ==
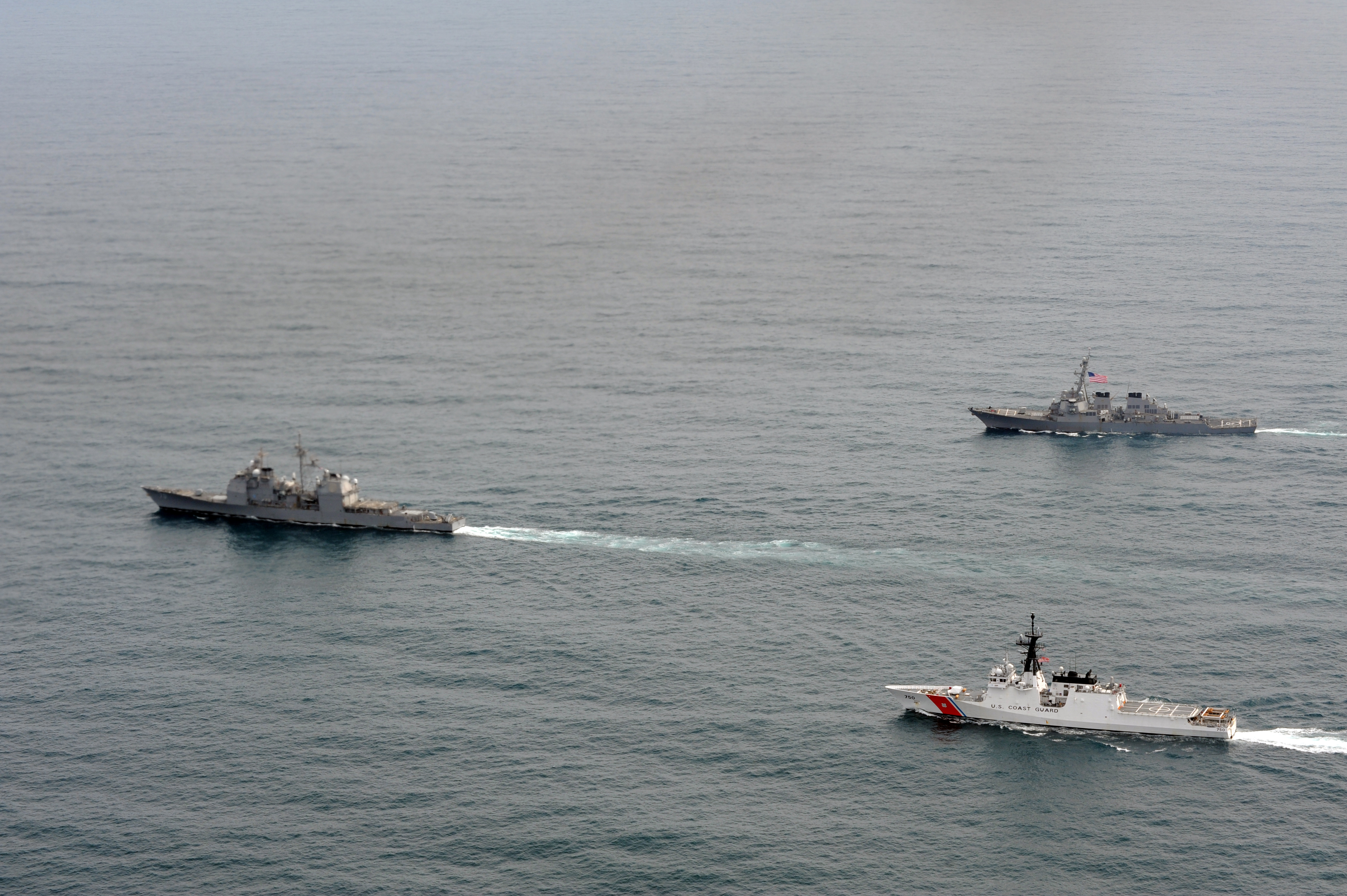
Bertholf underway in formation with the Navy during Exercise Northern Edge, 2011

The first NSC, USCGC Bertholf, entered sea trials in February 2008. She has been in service since August 2008, and is based at Coast Guard Island, Alameda, California. A second NSC, Waesche, was based in Alameda in 2010. Construction of Stratton, which now carries a crew of 123, began in 2008 at Huntington Ingalls Shipyard in Pascagoula. The vessel was christened by first lady Michelle Obama in July 2010, and delivered to the Coast Guard in September 2011. She is now in service in Alameda. Construction on the fourth NSC, Hamilton, began in 2011. She was delivered to the Coast Guard in September 2014.

In December 2009, a fleet mix analysis phase study called for nine NSCs. Eight ships are in the Program of Record. Seven hulls were funded as of the FY2013-2017 capital investment plan. The NSCs proved their capability to perform naval operations during the 2012 RIMPAC exercises, where the Bertholf detected and tracked missile threats and provided naval gunfire support for troops ashore during the training exercise, demonstrating the capability of moving with other naval forces and being able to perform other defense operations.

== Program issues ==
In July 2009, the Government Accountability Office reported that delays in the NSC program are likely to result in "the loss of thousands of cutter operational days for conducting missions through 2017." The GAO also reported that month that problems in the NSC program had delayed the OPC program by five years. The program was also plagued by structural issues. The Coast Guard historically uses its cutters extensively, typically 180 days at sea a year. Operations in North Pacific and North Atlantic waters are some of the roughest seas in the Northern Hemisphere. Stresses on the cutters are expected to be very severe. Structural analysis showed that some parts of the cutter could be expected to survive only 3 years. This was addressed in cutter 752 onwards, with the first two cutters receiving reinforcements.

WMSL-752, the Stratton, suffered corrosion and leaks within weeks of commissioning in 2012. Earlier ships have not had that problem, so it may be the result of the cathodic protection system being hooked up in reverse. The first NSC, the Bertholf, has had structural enhancements put into place to fix reports of fatigue life issues. The second NSC, Waesche, had structural enhancement work completed in September 2018. The cutter Stratton and all subsequent NSCs have the enhancements already installed. The NSC program originally encountered problems meeting TEMPEST requirements. After more recent testing, the first NSC, Bertholf, passed all TEMPEST requirements.

The delays and problems led to cost increases. The 2014 USCG estimate for eight ships is $5.474 billion, for an average unit cost of $684 million. The first six hulls cost $3.902 billion, for an average of $650 million per ship. The sixth NSC cost $735 million in FY2012-13. In the FY18 Homeland Security Appropriations Bill in November 2017, funding for the 10th NSC at a cost of $540 million and long lead items for the 11th NSC was proposed. The FY2018 Omnibus Appropriations Bill includes $1.24 billion in funding for the NSC program. The bill contained funding for the construction of the 10th National Security Cutter (NSC), long-lead-time materials for the 11th NSC, and construction of the 11th NSC.

The Department of Homeland Security Appropriations Act, 2020 makes available $100.5 million for long lead-time material for a 12th cutter. In March 2023, the Coast Guard's proposed FY2024 budget requested $17.1 million in procurement funding for the NSC program for post-delivery activities for the 10th and 11th NSCs, class-wide activities that included test and evaluation, and program close-out support, thereby suggesting it is not pursuing the option of a 12th cutter.

In January 2018, a whistleblower lawsuit against Lockheed Martin was unsealed, alleging that the company had sold defective communications systems to the NSC program. The qui tam lawsuit, filed by a former Lockheed employee, said Lockheed had concealed known problems with the radio-frequency distribution systems installed on nine NSCs, preventing them from simultaneously transmitting and receiving multiple radio signals. To settle the lawsuit, Lockheed agreed to pay the federal government $2.2 million, and to provide repairs valued at $2.2 million to the faulty systems.

On June 5, 2025, it was announced the 11th ship of the class, WMSL-760, USCGC Friedman was cancelled per a contract agreement reached between HII and the Trump administration.

== Variants ==
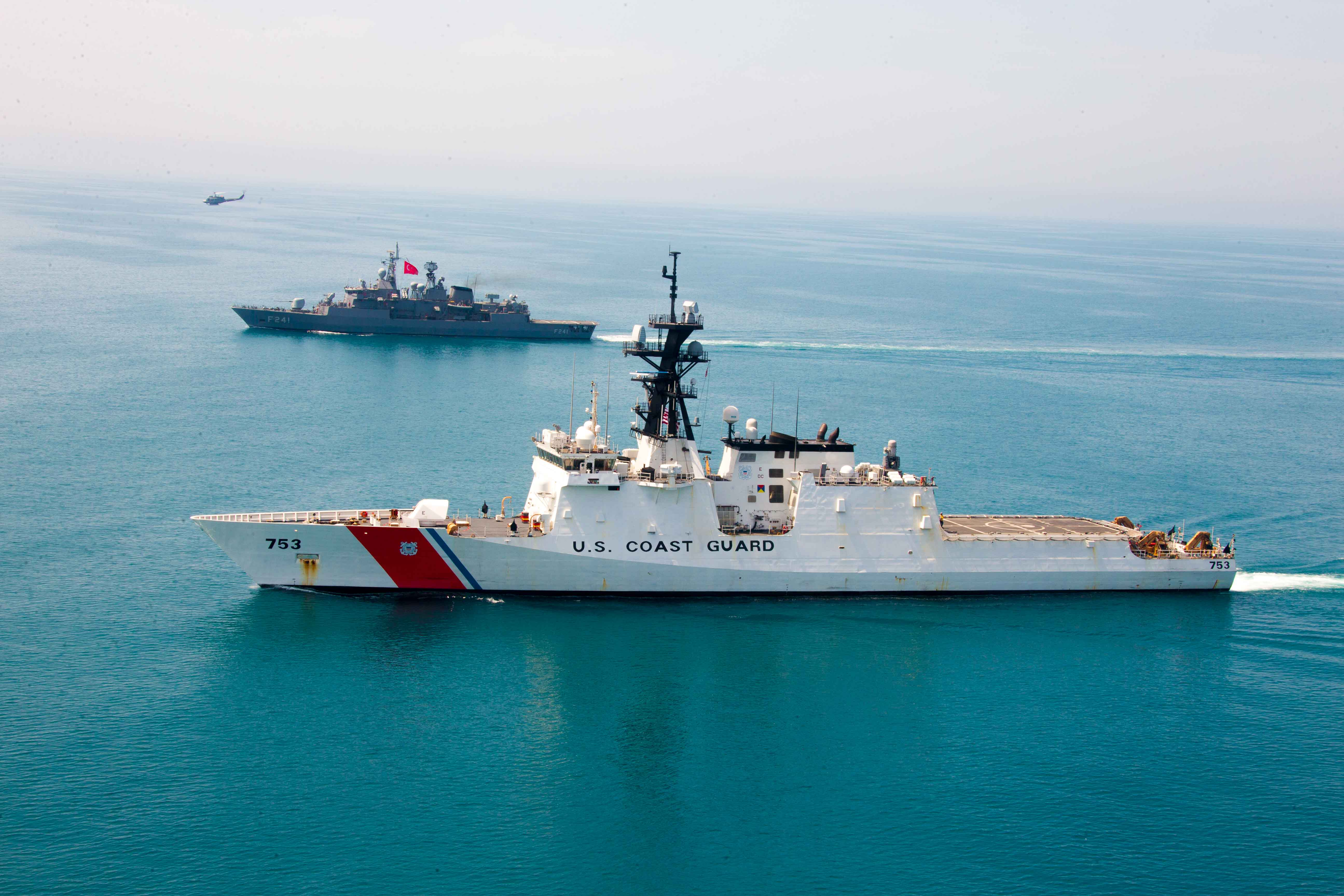
USCGC Hamilton and TCG Turgutreis in the Black Sea, April 2021

Huntington Ingalls Industries has proposed two "patrol frigates" for Navy use, based on the NSC hull.

Patrol Frigate 4501 is very similar to the NSC, the main differences being a modified stern ramp and a knuckle boom crane replacing the overhead crane. The crew is increased to 148. It was offered to the U.S. Navy as a replacement for the Littoral Combat Ship. The FY13 cost of an LCS was $446.3 million compared to $735 million for an NSC.

Patrol Frigate 4921 is a more radical redesign. It has a crew of 141. Weapons and sensors are added at the expense of reducing range from 12,000 to 8,000 nautical miles (22,000 to 15,000 km). It adds a 12-cell VLS launcher for ESSM air-defense missiles, just behind the main gun, which is upgraded from 57 mm to a 76 mm Super Rapid. Two quad launchers for Harpoon anti-ship missiles and a triple launcher for torpedoes are added to the stern. It retains the SeaRAM/Phalanx CIWS and 6 machine guns of other NSC variants. The stern is closed in and houses a towed-array sonar. A hull sonar is installed for mine countermeasures and an ESM suite. The original "National Patrol Frigate" concept had an AN/SPY-1F air-defense radar. By 2012 the PF 4921 was being shown with an Australian CEAFAR radar. Two other enhanced patrol frigates were also proposed, the 4922 and 4923. The Patrol Frigate 4922 redesign focuses on general combat systems upgrades, adding on additional ASW sonar and radar. The FF4923 redesign focuses on the Mk 41 VLS in favor of the Mk 56, for greater AAW/ASW/ASUW capability, adding 16 cells for used by ESSM, ASROC, and SM-2

Brazil, Saudi Arabia, and Germany have shown interest in NSC derivatives.

The National Security Cutter was selected as the basis for the FF(X) frigate after the cancellation of the Constellation class frigate program.

== Ship list ==
Ship	Hull Number	Builder	Namesake	Steel Cut	Laid down	Launched	Commissioned	Homeport	Status
Bertholf	WMSL-750	Ingalls Shipbuilding, Pascagoula	Commodore Ellsworth P. Bertholf		March 29, 2005	September 29, 2006	August 4, 2008	Alameda, CA	Active in service
Waesche	WMSL-751	Ingalls Shipbuilding, Pascagoula	Admiral Russell R. Waesche		September 11, 2006	July 12, 2008	May 7, 2010	Alameda, CA	Active in service
Stratton	WMSL-752	Ingalls Shipbuilding, Pascagoula	Captain Dorothy C. Stratton		July 20, 2009	July 23, 2010	March 31, 2012	Alameda, CA	Active in service
Hamilton	WMSL-753	Ingalls Shipbuilding, Pascagoula	Secretary Alexander Hamilton		September 5, 2012	August 10, 2013	December 6, 2014	Charleston, SC	Active in service
James	WMSL-754	Ingalls Shipbuilding, Pascagoula	Captain Joshua James		May 17, 2013	May 3, 2014	August 8, 2015	Charleston, SC	Active in service
Munro	WMSL-755	Ingalls Shipbuilding, Pascagoula	Signalman First Class Douglas A. Munro		November 5, 2014	September 12, 2015	April 1, 2017	Alameda, CA	Active in service
Kimball	WMSL-756	Ingalls Shipbuilding, Pascagoula	Sumner I. Kimball		March 4, 2016	December 17, 2016	August 24, 2019	Honolulu, HI	Active in service
Midgett	WMSL-757	Ingalls Shipbuilding, Pascagoula	Midgett Family		January 30, 2017	November 22, 2017	August 24, 2019	Honolulu, HI	Active in service
Stone	WMSL-758	Ingalls Shipbuilding, Pascagoula	Commander Elmer F. Stone		September 14, 2018	October 4, 2019	March 19, 2021	Charleston, SC	Active in service
Calhoun	WMSL-759	Ingalls Shipbuilding, Pascagoula	Master Chief Petty Officer of the Coast Guard Charles L. Calhoun	2019 Nov 12	July 23, 2021	April 3, 2022	April 20, 2024	Charleston, SC	Active in service
Friedman	WMSL-760	Ingalls Shipbuilding, Pascagoula	Elizebeth Smith Friedman					Charleston, SC	Previously under construction. Cancelled June 5, 2025.
Unnamed	WMSL- 761								Long Lead Time Materials (LLTM) funded as Option for 12th ship. LLTM contract not yet awarded. $300,000,000 is authorized for a twelfth National Security Cutter. USCG has not exercised option, as of March 2023.

=== Gallery ===
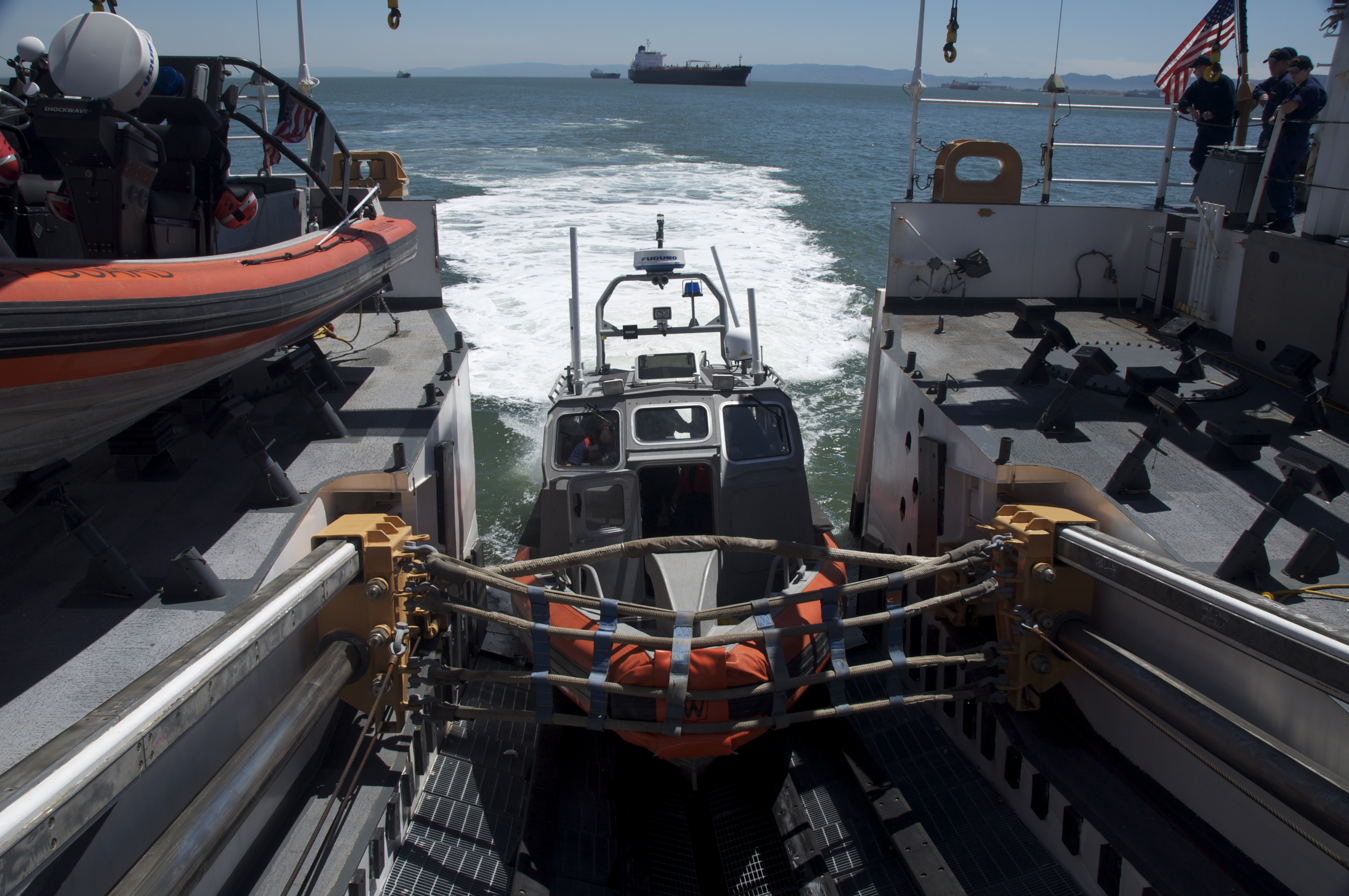
A long range interceptor aboard the cutter Bertholf

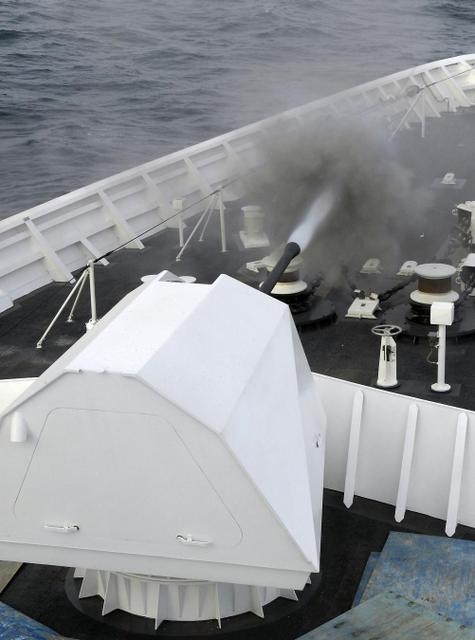
The Mk 110 aboard the Bertholf firing during Combat System Ship Qualification Trials

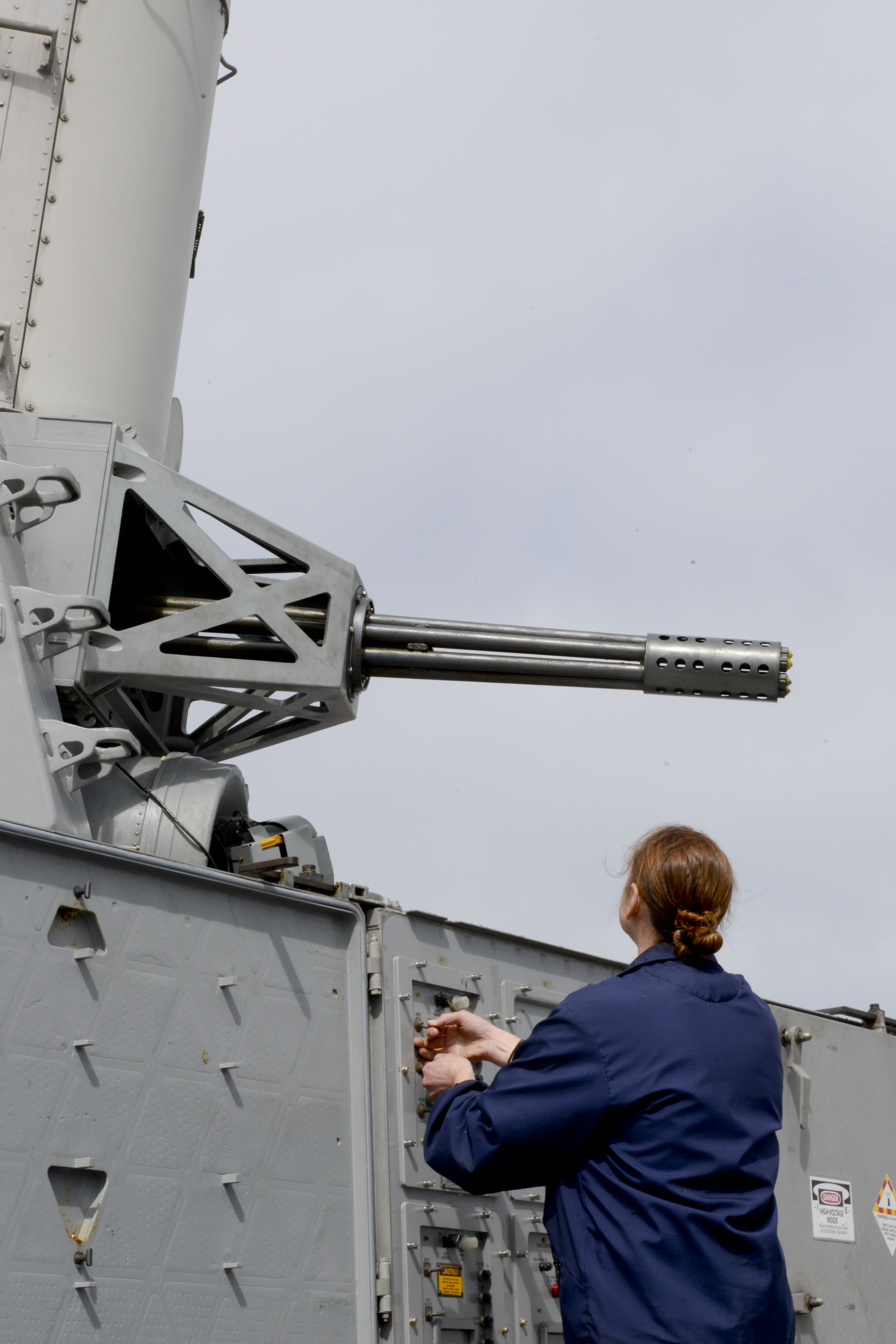
A Phalanx CIWS aboard the cutter Waesche during pre-fire checks

A NULKA decoy is fired from the cutter Bertholf

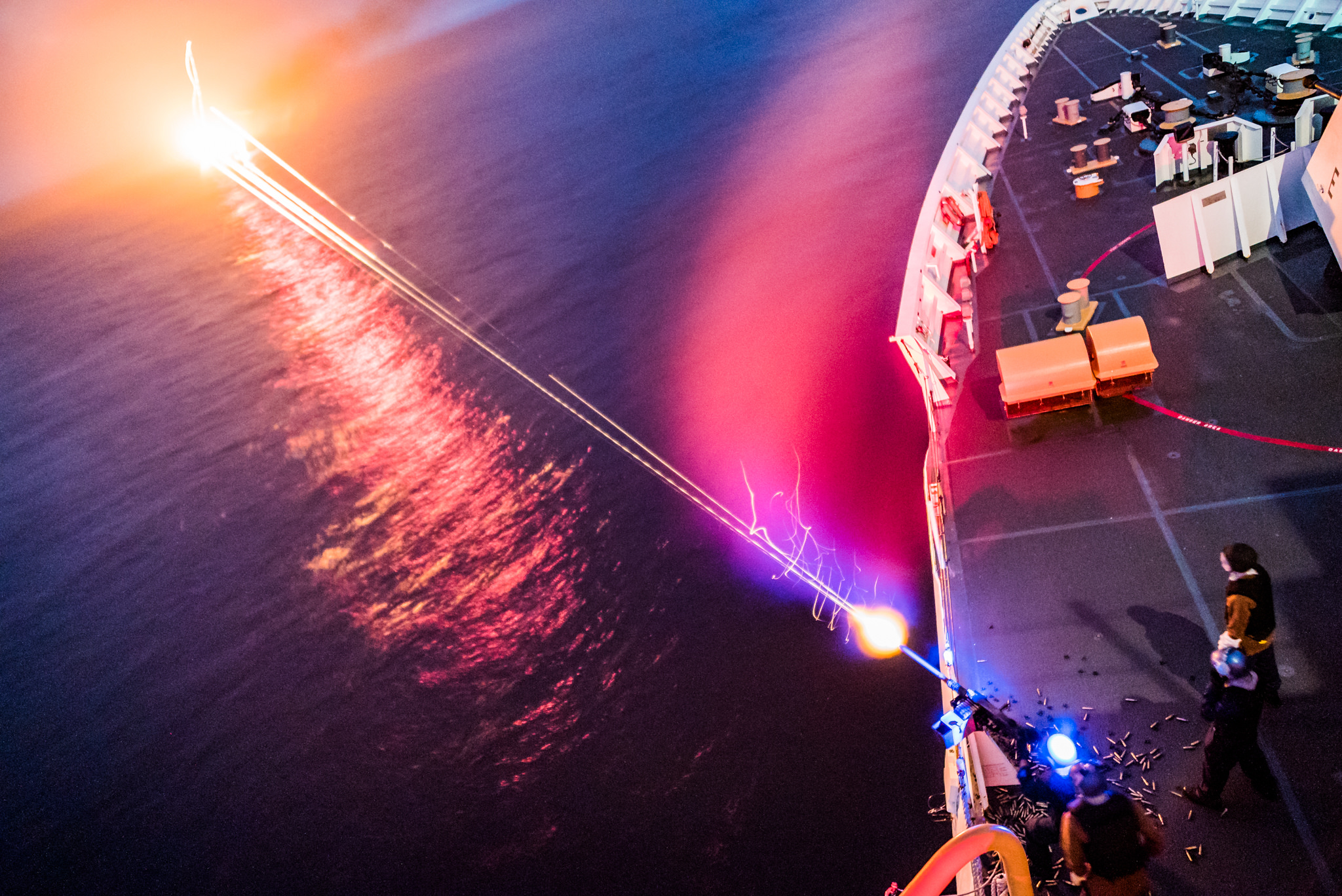
A nighttime live-fire exercise with a .50 caliber machine gun aboard the cutter Stratton

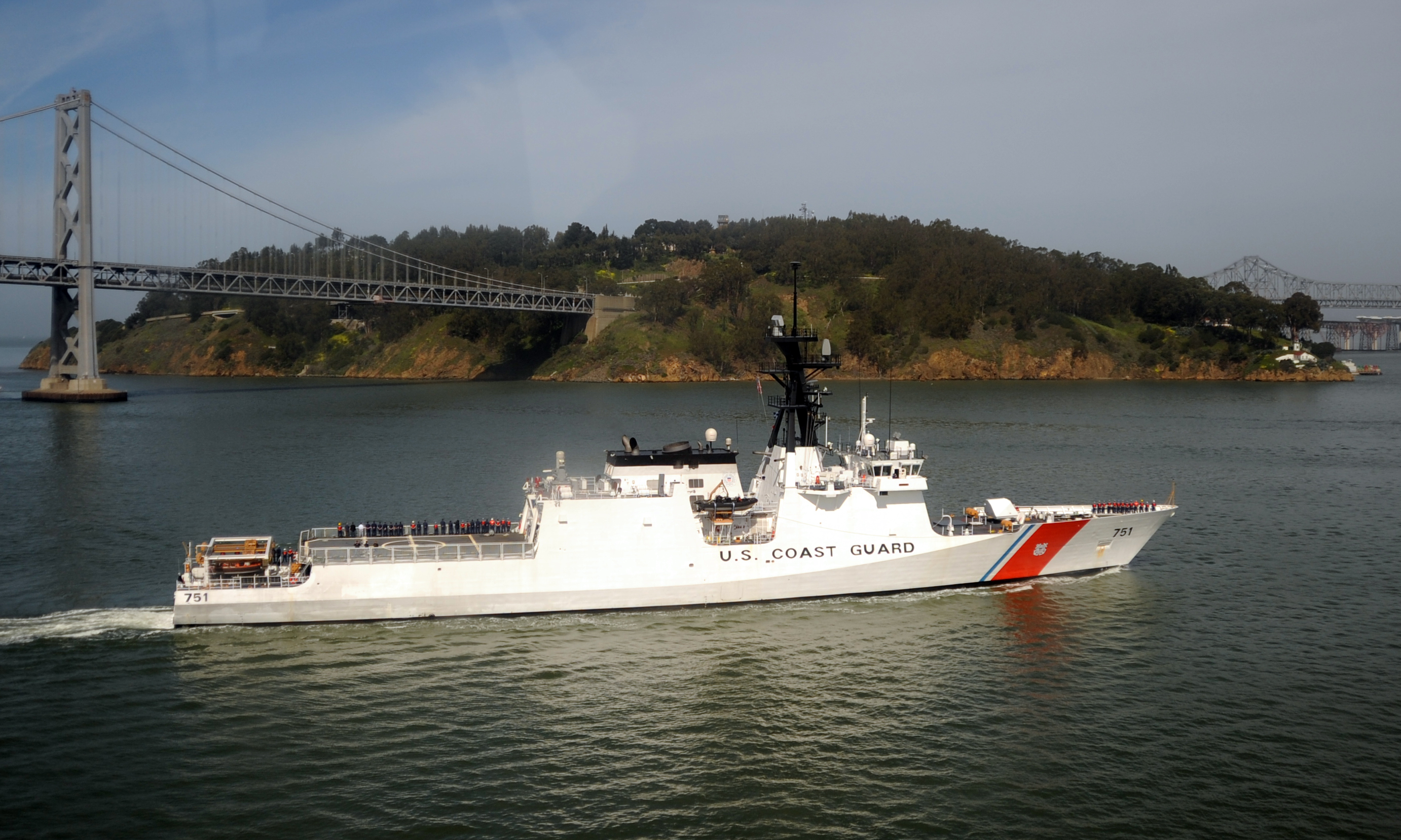
USCGC Waesche in San Francisco Bay

== See also ==
- Equipment of the United States Coast Guard
- Offshore Patrol Cutter
- USCG Seagoing Buoy Tender
- USCG inland buoy tender
