= USCGC Friedman =

Canceled Legend-class cutter of the United States Coast Guard

USCGC Friedman (WMSL-760)
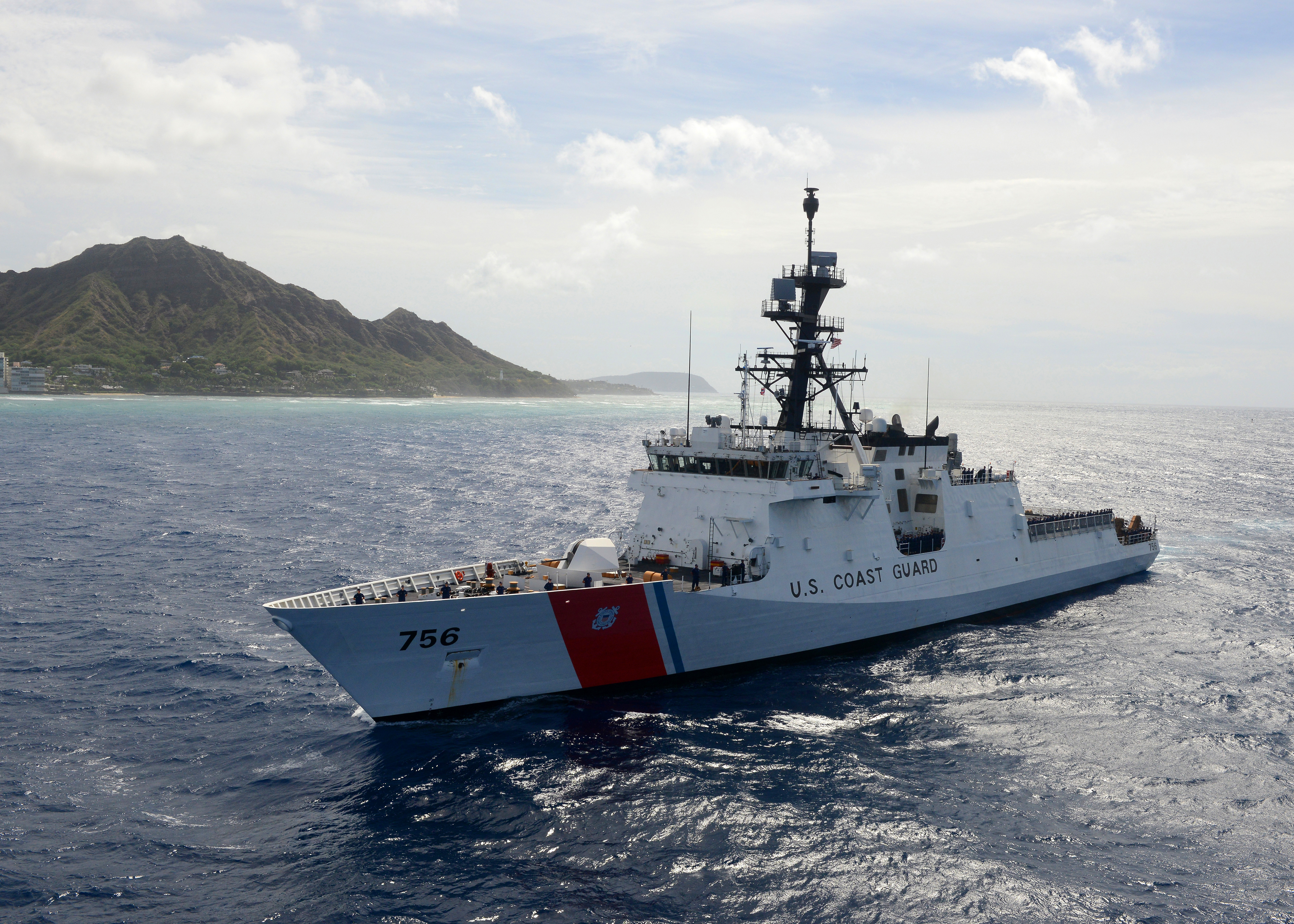
- Legend-class cutter

History

United States
- Name: Friedman
- Namesake: Elizebeth Smith Friedman
- Awarded: 21 December 2018
- Builder: Huntington Ingalls Industries, Pascagoula, Mississippi
- Cost: $499.76 million
- Identification: Pennant number: WMSL-760
- Status: Cancelled June 5, 2025

General characteristics
- Class & type: Legend-class cutter
- Displacement: 4,500 long tons (4,600 t)
- Length: 418 ft (127 m)
- Beam: 54 ft (16 m)
- Draft: 22.5 ft (6.9 m)
- Propulsion: Combined diesel and gas
- Speed: 28 knots (52 km/h; 32 mph)
- Range: 12,000 nmi (22,000 km; 14,000 mi)
- Endurance: 60 to 90-day patrol cycles
- Complement: 120
- Sensors & processing systems: AN/SPS-75 air search radar; SPQ-9B fire control radar; AN/SPS-79 surface search radar
- Electronic warfare & decoys: AN/SLQ-32 electronic warfare system; 2 x Mk-36 SRBOC/ 2 x Mk-53 NULKA countermeasures chaff/rapid decoy launcher
- Armament: 1 x Mk-110 57 mm Naval Gun System (variant of the Bofors 57 mm gun); 1 × 20 mm Block 1B Phalanx close-in weapons system; 4 × .50 caliber machine guns; 2 × M240B 7.62 mm machine guns
- Armor: Ballistic protection for main gun
- Aircraft carried: 2 x MH-65C Dolphin MCH, or 1 x MH-65C Dolphin MCH and 2 x sUAS

USCGC Friedman (WMSL-760) was to be the eleventh Legend-class cutter of the United States Coast Guard. On 5 June 2025 it was announced per agreement between Huntington Ingalls Industries and the Trump administration that she had been cancelled. She was to be the first ship to be named after Elizebeth Smith Friedman, the famous American cryptologist.

== Development and design ==
All of Legend-class cutters were constructed by Huntington Ingalls Industries and were part of the Integrated Deepwater System Program. They are of the high endurance cutter roles with additional upgrades to make it more of an asset to the Department of Defense during declared national emergency contingencies. The cutters are armed mainly to take on lightly armed hostiles in Low-Threat Environments.

== Construction and career ==
Friedman and her sister ship Calhoun were ordered on 21 December 2018. Construction by Huntington Ingalls Industries began on 11 May 2021.

On June 5, 2025 it was announced the contract for Friedman was cancelled, in an agreement between Huntington Ingalls Industries and the Trump administration.

Because of the similarity between the FF(X) frigate and the Legend-class cutter, the US Navy intends to utilize parts from the canceled Friedman to achieve the target of launching the first FF(X) frigate by late 2028.
