= Carl W. Constantine =

4th Master Chief Petty Officer of the Coast Guard

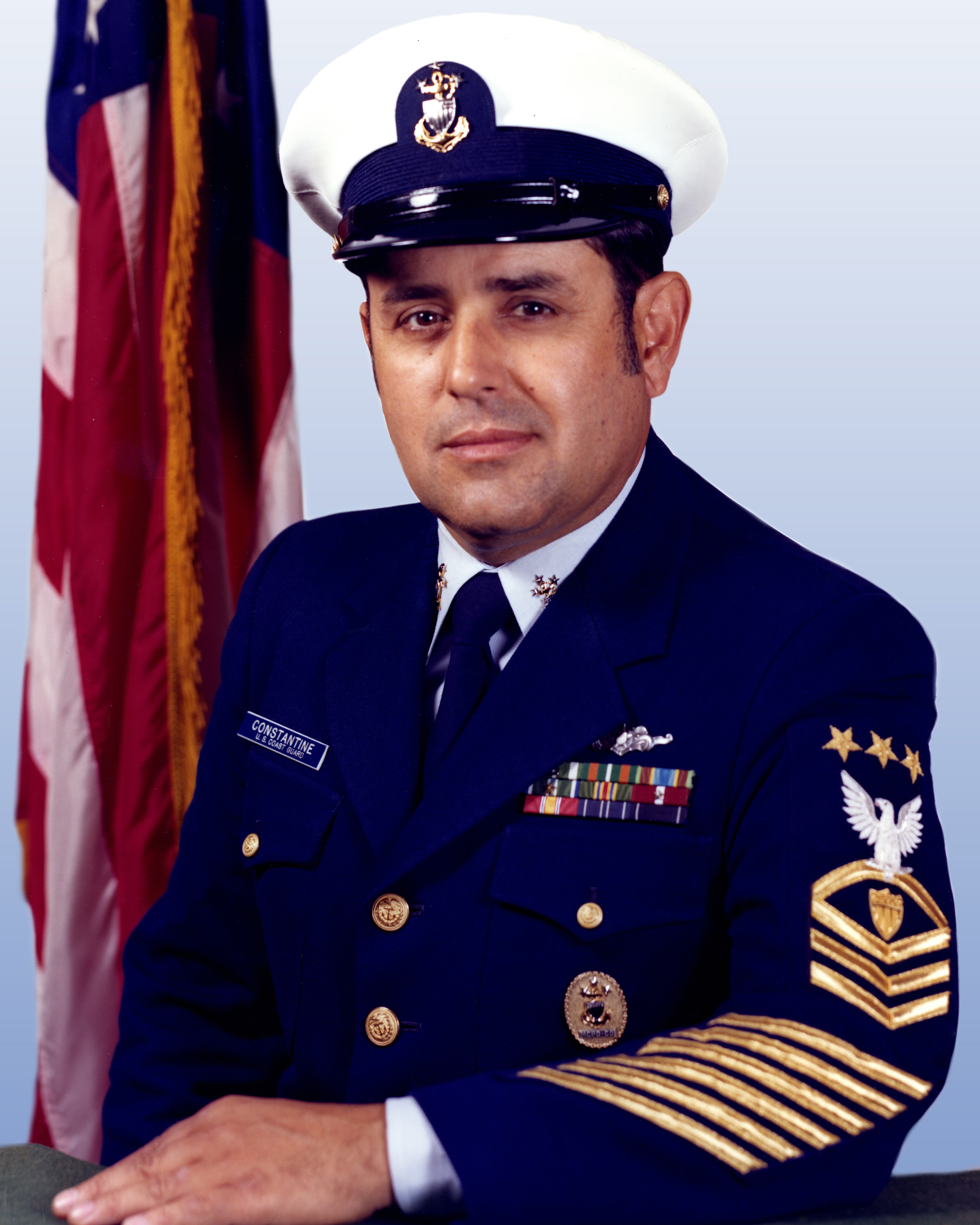
- MCPOCG Carl W. Constantine
- Born: September 14, 1938 (age 87); San Pedro, California, U.S.
- Military career
- Allegiance: United States of America
- Branch: United States Coast Guard
- Service years: 1957—1986
- Rank: Master Chief Petty Officer of the Coast Guard; Master Chief Radioman

Carl Wayne Constantine (born September 14, 1938) was the fourth Master Chief Petty Officer of the Coast Guard, serving as the enlisted advisor to the Commandant of the Coast Guard, from 1981 to 1986. He was born in San Pedro, California.

Constantine enlisted in the United States Coast Guard on February 28, 1957, at Long Beach, California and attended basic training at Alameda, California as a seaman recruit. Upon completion of basic training he was sent to radioman school. Upon graduation from radioman school he spent the next three years serving aboard USCGC Minnetonka and USCGC Heather

Upon transfer he spent the next five and a half years at Coast Guard radio stations in Miami, Florida and Honolulu, Hawaii. After leaving Honolulu, he was transferred to USCGC Tamaroa, homeported at Staten Island, New York, where he was advanced to chief petty officer in 1966. From 1968 to 1970, he served at the Coast Guard Communications Center at Governors Island in New York. In 1970, he was assigned to serve aboard USCGC Gallatin. In October 1972 he was assigned to Coast Guard Radio Station Washington, D.C. where he obtained the rating of senior chief radioman. In September 1974 he began a seven-year tour in Alaska where he served as the radioman-in-charge of the communication center at the Seventeenth Coast Guard District office, Juneau. While in Juneau he was also selected as the command enlisted advisor for the Seventeenth Coast Guard District. On August 1, 1981, Admiral John B. Hayes, Commandant of the Coast Guard, appointed him as the fourth Master Chief Petty Officer of the Coast Guard.

Constantine's awards include the Coast Guard Commendation Medal (twice), CG Achievement Medal, CG Meritorious Unit Commendation (twice), Navy Meritorious Unit Commendation, CG Letter of Commendation Ribbon, CG Good Conduct Medal (with silver star), Marksmanship Ribbon (Pistol and Rifle), National Defense Service Medal and the CG Cutterman's Insignia.

He has attended numerous management classes including the Senior Petty officer Leadership and Management School. He co-developed and instructed a Seventeenth Coast Guard District Junior Petty Officer Leadership school, and also attended the University of Alaska.
