= Hollis B. Stephens =

3rd Master Chief Petty Officer of the Coast Guard

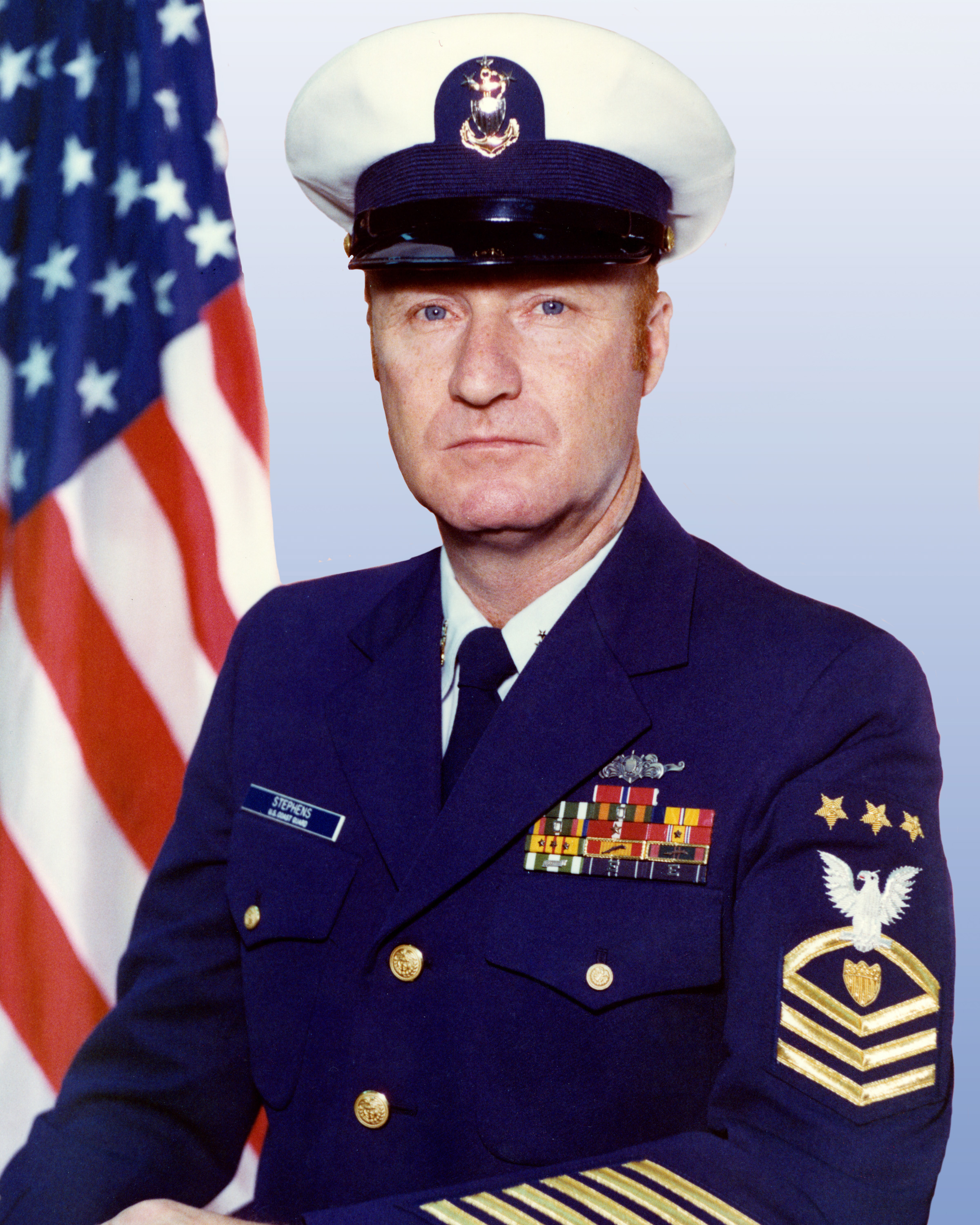
- MCPOCG Hollis Stephens
- Born: November 30, 1932 (age 93); Georgia, U.S.
- Military career
- Allegiance: United States of America
- Branch: United States Coast Guard
- Service years: 1950—1981
- Rank: Master Chief Petty Officer of the Coast Guard; Master Chief Boatswain's Mate
- Conflicts: Vietnam War

Hollis Byron Stephens (born November 30, 1932) was the third Master Chief Petty Officer of the Coast Guard, serving as the enlisted advisor to the Commandant of the Coast Guard from 1977 to 1981. He was born in Georgia.

Stephens enlisted in the United States Coast Guard on January 17, 1950, and after boot training was assigned to the Coast Guard Station at Grand Haven, Michigan, where he subsequently advanced from seaman apprentice to boatswain's mate second class. From August to November 1954, he served as coxswain on search and rescue missions out of Port Aransas Lifeboat Station. He next served two years aboard USCGC Triton. From 1956 to 1958 he was assigned as officer-in-charge of the Light Attendant Station, Panama City, Florida, and Point Aufer Light Station, Louisiana. Next he served on board the 83' patrol cutter at Panama City, where he was advanced to chief boatswain's mate.

He returned to Port Aransas where he served various jobs including: lifeboat station, group office, and officer-in-charge of both USCGC Myrtle and the 82' patrol cutter. From 1962 to 1965 he served as an instructor of recruits at the Coast Guard Training Center Cape May, New Jersey. That was followed by two years at Loran Station Kolca, Kauai, Hawaii. In 1967 he was transferred to Detroit, Michigan where he served aboard USCGC Bramble and later as officer-in-charge of the recruiting station at Detroit. From June 1970 to July 1971, he was assigned to port security and waterways detail and as a liaison between U.S. Army transportation units and Coast Guard explosive loading detachments in the Republic of South Vietnam. After returning to the United States, he returned to Detroit where he served at the group office until 1974. Stephens was assigned as executive petty officer and training officer of the presidential support detail at Miami Beach, Florida. His next assignment was stationed at Coast Guard Base Miami, Florida. On August 1, 1977, Master Chief Stephens was selected to become the third Master Chief Petty Officer of the Coast Guard.

Stephens' awards include the Bronze Star Medal, Coast Guard Commendation Medal, Coast Guard Achievement Medal, Combat Action, Coast Guard Good Conduct with Silver Star, National Defense Service Medal, Vietnam Service Medal, Republic of Vietnam Gallantry Cross Unit Citation, Republic of Vietnam Civil Action Unit Citation, Republic of Vietnam Campaign Medal, Expert Rifle Medal, Expert Pistol Medal. He also has the Cutterman Insignia and the Coxswain Insignia.

== Awards and decorations ==
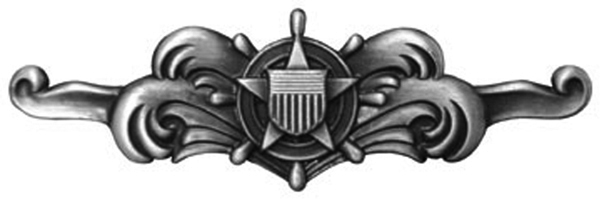

Enlisted Cutterman insignia
Bronze Star
Coast Guard Commendation Medal	Coast Guard Achievement Medal with Operational Distinguishing Device	Navy Combat Action Ribbon
Navy Unit Commendation with Operational Distinguishing Device	Coast Guard Good Conduct Medal with silver award star	National Defense Service Medal with bronze award star
Vietnam Service Medal with three bronze award stars	Vietnam Gallantry Cross with palm	Civil Actions Medal unit citation ribbon
Vietnam Campaign Medal	Coast Guard rifle Marksmanship ribbon with expert device	Coast Guard pistol Marksmanship ribbon with expert device
