= Vincent W. Patton III =

Eighth Master Chief Petty Officer of the Coast Guard

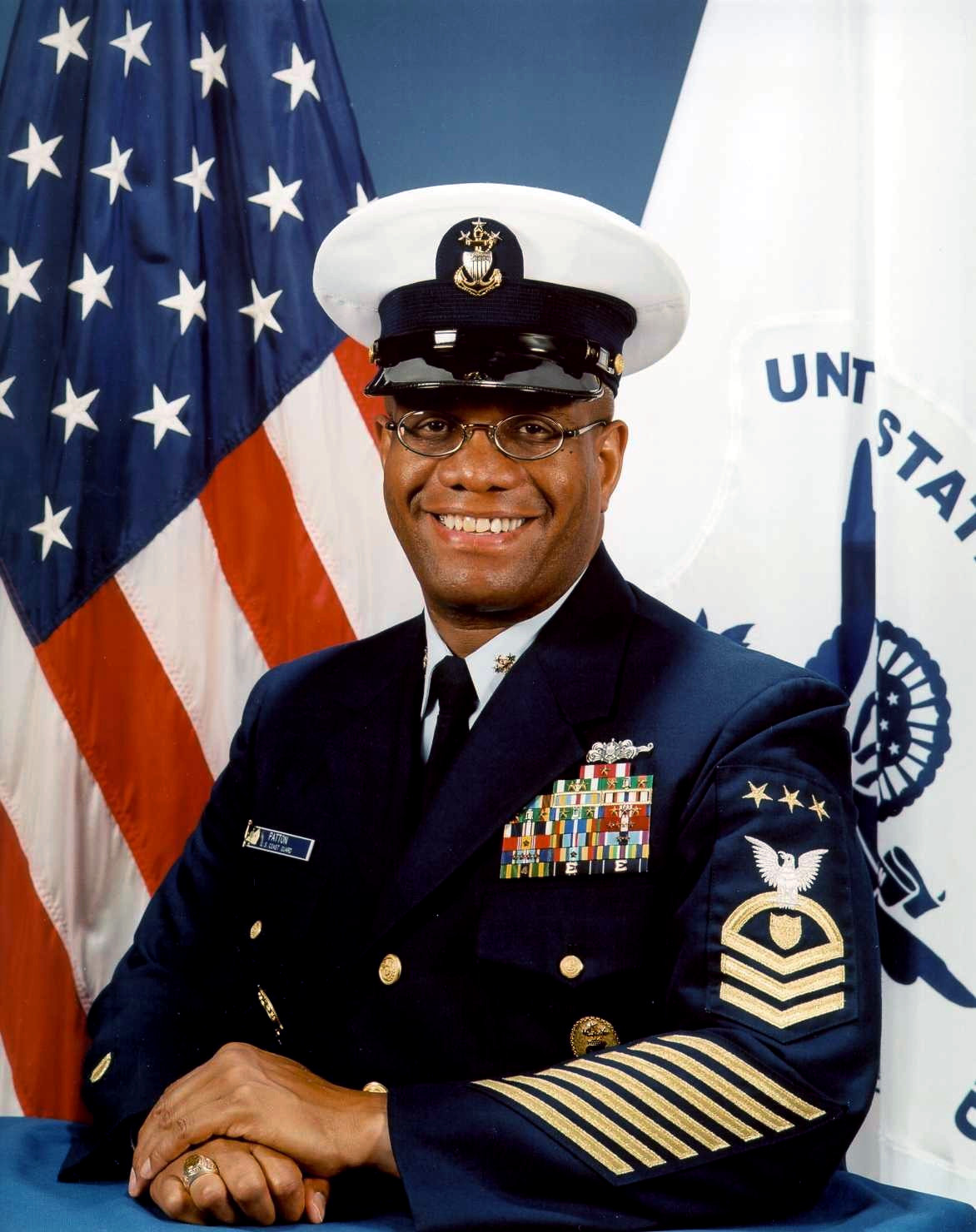
- Born: November 21, 1954 (age 71); Detroit, Michigan, U.S.
- Military career
- Allegiance: United States of America
- Branch: United States Coast Guard
- Service years: 1972–2002
- Rank: Master Chief Petty Officer of the Coast Guard
- Awards: Coast Guard Distinguished Service Medal; Meritorious Service Medal (2); Coast Guard Commendation Medal (3); Coast Guard Achievement Medal (3) with "O" Device

Vincent W. Patton III (born 21 November 1954 in Detroit Michigan) is a retired Master Chief Petty Officer of the Coast Guard in the United States.

== Education ==
A 1972 graduate of Cass Technical High School, Patton was a member of the U.S. Naval Sea Cadet Corps (NSCC) during his high school years. Patton received his Doctor of Education degree in 1984 from the American University, Washington, DC. He has a master's degree in Counseling Psychology from Loyola University Chicago; a Bachelor of Science degree in Social Work from Shaw College at Detroit, Michigan; and a Bachelor of Arts degree in communications from Pacific Union College, Angwin, California.

== Career ==
Patton became the first African American selected as the service's senior-most enlisted ranking position as the Master Chief Petty Officer of the Coast Guard in 1998. His career included staff and operational assignments both afloat and ashore throughout the United States, and a joint military service assignment in Cuba and Haiti.

Patton served as the eighth Master Chief Petty Officer of the Coast Guard from May 1998 to October 2002. As the service's top senior enlisted leader and ombudsman, he was the principal advisor to the Commandant of the Coast Guard, his directorates, and the Secretaries of Transportation and Defense.

Military offices
Preceded by Eric A. Trent	Master Chief Petty Officer of the Coast Guard; 1998–2002	Succeeded by Frank A. Welch
