= Coast Guard Station New Haven =

US Coast Guard station in Connecticut

Coordinates: 41°16′21″N 72°54′12″W

USCG emblem

United States Coast Guard Station New Haven is located at 120 Woodward Avenue, New Haven, Connecticut 06512. It belongs to the Long Island Sound sector of operations.

== Operations ==
Annually the New Haven Coast Guard Station carries out about 150-200 search and rescue operations along with 200-300 boardings and searches of vessels. As well as these active services, Station New Haven gives hourly weather reports for all seafarers in their area. If required the Sound has at its disposal 500 active service members, 200 reservists and 1200 auxiliaries to call upon.

== Patrol Area ==
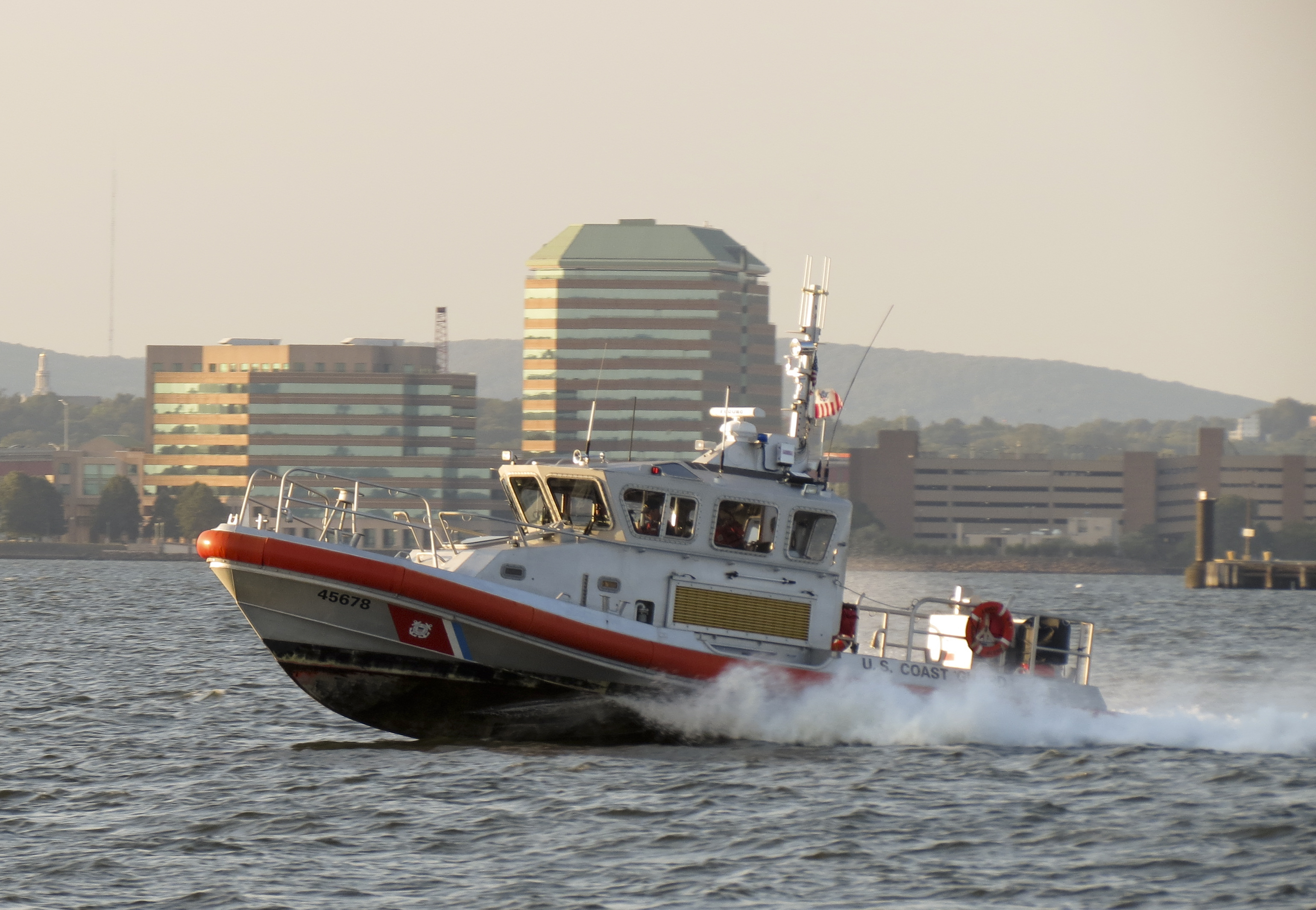
A RB-M Responding to a call from Station New Haven

Station New Haven's patrol area is predominantly around Long Island Sound, from Black Rock Harbor to Clinton Harbor on the Connecticut side. On the Long Island side it's Mattituck Inlet to 2 nautical miles east out from Mt. Sinai Harbor. At the end of 2011 the station received a new RB-M (Response Boat-Medium) Coast Guard vessel, replacing its previous vessel which had served the station since 1977.

== Open House ==
Each year in the month of May Station New Haven hosts an open house day where members of the public are welcome to visit and see displays of equipment used, methods, and an example of a search and rescue mission when a helicopter arrives from Air Station Atlantic City in New Jersey.
