= USCGC Wyaconda =

- USCGC Wyaconda (WLR-75403)

History

United States
- Name: USCGC Wyaconda
- Operator: United States Coast Guard
- Builder: Maxon Construction Co, Tell City, Indiana
- Cost: US$374,423
- Launched: 7 March 1965
- Commissioned: 30 May 1965
- Home port: Dubuque, Iowa
- Identification: MMSI number: 366999516; Callsign: NAGA
- Status: In service

General characteristics
- Class & type: Gasconade class 75 ft (23 m) river buoy tender
- Displacement: 141 tons
- Length: 75 ft (23 m)
- Beam: 22 ft (6.7 m)
- Draft: 4 ft (1.2 m)
- Propulsion: 2 diesel engines turning 2 shafts with 600 bhp
- Speed: 8 knots (15 km/h)
- Notes: Designed to work in tandem with a 130 ft (40 m) work barge

USCGC Wyaconda is a Gasconade-class 75-foot (23 m) river buoy tender that was commissioned 30 May 1965 at Leavenworth, Kansas. Wyaconda was the first of four Gasconade-class buoy tenders built by Maxon Construction Co. of Tell City, Indiana. She has been homeported at Dubuque, Iowa since June 1973. Her areas of responsibility are the upper Mississippi River from Clinton, Iowa to Minneapolis, Minnesota; Minnesota River from St. Paul, Minnesota to Shakopee, Minnesota; and St. Croix River from Prescott, Wisconsin to Stillwater, Minnesota.

== Bibliography ==
- World navies of Today specifications for Gasconade class tug-type river buoy tenders
- Monitoring Times online magazine
- "Sector Upper Mississippi River Cutters". USCG Sector Upper Mississippi River. U.S. Coast Guard.
- Scheina, Robert L. (1990). U.S. Coast Guard Cutters & Craft, 1946-1990. Naval Institute Press, Annapolis. ISBN 978-0-87021-719-7.
