= Master Chief Petty Officer of the Coast Guard =

Senior enlisted member of the US Coast Guard

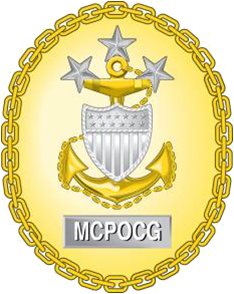
- Badge of the MCPOCG

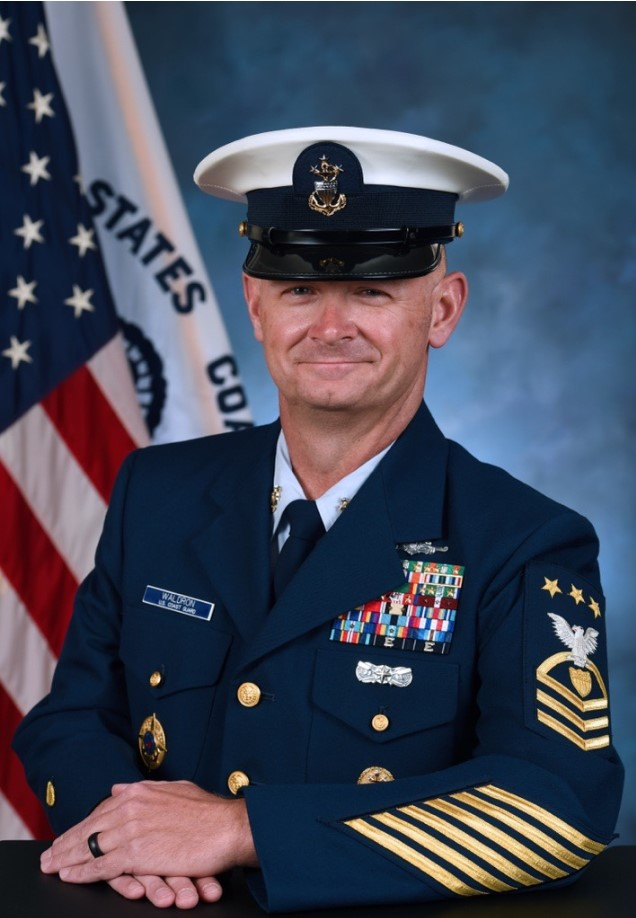
- Incumbent; Phillip N. Waldron since 25 July 2025
- United States Coast Guard
- Type: Senior enlisted advisor
- Abbreviation: MCPOCG
- Reports to: Commandant of the Coast Guard
- Appointer: Commandant of the Coast Guard
- Term length: 4 years
- Formation: 27 August 1969; 57 years ago
- First holder: Charles L. Calhoun
- Deputy: Deputy Master Chief Petty Officer of the Coast Guard
- Salary: $10,758.00 per month, regardless of the incumbent's service longevity
- Website: uscg.mil/MCPOCG

The master chief petty officer of the Coast Guard (MCPOCG) is the senior enlisted member of the United States Coast Guard and the principal advisor to the commandant of the Coast Guard on all enlisted personnel matters.

The holder of this position is equivalent to the master chief petty officer of the Navy, sergeant major of the Marine Corps, sergeant major of the Army, chief master sergeant of the Air Force, and chief master sergeant of the Space Force, and by protocol, is equal to a vice admiral.

The MCPOCG is appointed by the commandant of the Coast Guard to serve as a spokesperson to address the issues of enlisted personnel to the highest levels in the Coast Guard and is designated as a special paygrade above E-9. As such the MCPOCG is the senior enlisted advisor to the commandant of the Coast Guard. The MCPOCG's exact duties vary, depending on the commandant, though generally devotes much time traveling throughout the Coast Guard observing training and communicating with coast guardsmen and their families. The normal tour of assignment is four years, which typically runs concurrently with the commandant.

The first member to hold this post was MCPOCG Charles L. Calhoun. The 15th and current MCPOCG is Phillip N. Waldron who assumed office on 25 July 2025.

== Insignia ==
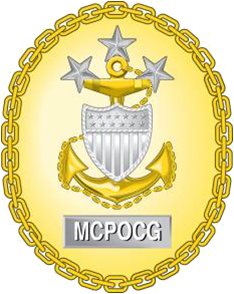
MCPOCG insignia
Sleeve	Collar/Cap	Badge

== List of master chief petty officers of the Coast Guard ==
No.	Portrait	Name (born–died)	Term of office			Ref.
No.	Portrait	Name (born–died)	Took office	Left office	Time in office	Ref.
1		Charles L. Calhoun (1925–2002)	27 August 1969	1 August 1973	3 years, 339 days	
2		Philip F. Smith (1932–2017)	1 August 1973	1 August 1977	4 years, 0 days	
3		Hollis B. Stephens (1932–)	1 August 1977	1 August 1981	4 years, 0 days	
4		Carl W. Constantine (1938–)	1 August 1981	1 May 1986	4 years, 273 days	
5		Allen Thiele (1940–2017)	1 May 1986	29 June 1990	4 years, 59 days	
6		R. Jay Lloyd (?–)	29 June 1990	1 July 1994	4 years, 2 days	
7		Eric A. Trent (1944–)	1 July 1994	31 May 1998	3 years, 334 days	
8		Vincent W. Patton III (1954–)	31 May 1998	10 October 2002	4 years, 132 days	
9		Frank A. Welch (1960–2026)	10 October 2002	14 June 2006	3 years, 247 days	
10		Charles W. Bowen (?–)	14 June 2006	21 May 2010	3 years, 341 days	
11		Michael P. Leavitt (1960–)	21 May 2010	22 May 2014	4 years, 1 day	
12		Steven W. Cantrell (?–)	22 May 2014	17 May 2018	3 years, 360 days	
13		Jason M. Vanderhaden (?–)	17 May 2018	19 May 2022	4 years, 2 days	
14		Heath B. Jones (?–)	19 May 2022	25 July 2025	3 years, 67 days	
15		Phillip Waldron (?–)	25 July 2025	Incumbent	1 year, 106 days	

== See also ==
- Senior Enlisted Advisor to the Chairman
- Sergeant Major of the Army
- Command Sergeant Major of the US Army Reserve
- Sergeant Major of the Marine Corps
- Master Chief Petty Officer of the Navy
- Chief Master Sergeant of the Air Force
- Chief Master Sergeant of the Space Force
- Senior Enlisted Advisor to the Chief of the National Guard Bureau
- Master Chief Petty Officer of the Coast Guard Reserve Force
