= Commandant's Letter of Commendation Ribbon (United States Coast Guard) =

- Commandant's Letter of Commendation Ribbon
- Type: Individual award ribbon
- Awarded for: An act or service resulting in unusual and/or outstanding achievement
- Presented by: United States Department of Homeland Security
- Eligibility: Members of the Armed Forces of the United States, including foreign military personnel serving in any capacity with the Coast Guard
- Status: Currently awarded
- First award: 17 March 1979

Precedence
- Next (higher): Service achievement medals
- Next (lower): Coast Guard Combat Action Ribbon

The Commandant's Letter of Commendation Ribbon is a personal military award of the United States Coast Guard. The award was established in March 1979 by Admiral John B. Hayes.

== Criteria ==
The Commandant's Letter of Commendation Ribbon is awarded to any member of the Coast Guard who receives a Letter of Commendation from the Commandant of the United States Coast Guard. The decoration is retroactive to August 12, 1921 which was when the Commandant's Commendation Letter was first issued by Admiral William E. Reynolds.

Additional awards of the Commandant's Letter of Commendation Ribbon are denoted by 5/16 inch stars. The Commandant's Letter of Commendation Ribbon with the Operational Distinguishing Device may be authorized for operational and field condition achievements. Considering Coast Guard awards and decorations only, the Commandant's Letter of Commendation Ribbon is below the Coast Guard Achievement Medal in order of precedence.

== See also ==
- Awards and decorations of the United States military
