= Cutterman insignia =

United States Coast Guard insignia to represent service aboard a Coast Guard cutter

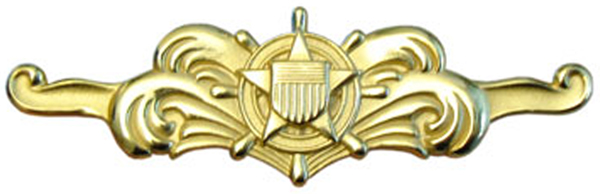
Cutterman insignia - officer

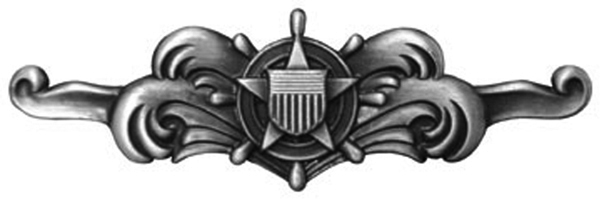
Cutterman insignia - enlisted

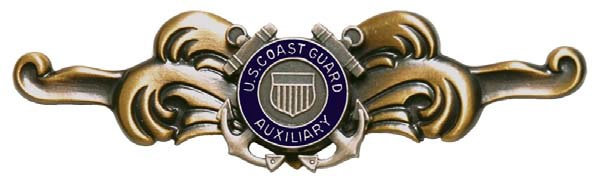
Cutterman insignia - auxiliary

The cutterman insignia is a device awarded by the United States Coast Guard to represent service aboard a Coast Guard cutter. The pin is awarded on a temporary basis after six months of sea time, qualification in required watch stations, successful completion of an oral or written board, and receiving a recommendation from their unit's commanding officer. Temporary insignias may be worn while attached to a cutter, but must be removed upon permanently transferring to a non-afloat unit. The award becomes permanent after 5 years of cumulative sea time in the Coast Guard (prior service sea time counts for pay purposes, but not for qualification as a cutterman).

On 18 October 1974, the Office of Personnel promulgated the Coast Guard Cutterman Insignia program, to “recognize the contributions and qualifications of our personnel.” The version awarded to officers is gold-toned, while the version awarded to enlisted members is pewter-toned.

The analog to Coast Guard cuttermen in the United States Navy would be surface warfare officer (SWO) and enlisted surface warfare specialist (ESWS).

The United States Coast Guard Auxiliary also issues a version of the cutterman insignia that requires a minimum of two years serving at least 52 days per year aboard a cutter, 65 feet in length or greater, and including a minimum of 24 of those days being served underway. The insignia design is identical in size and form to the cutterman insignia. A pewter auxiliary emblem is superimposed in the center of the bronze-tone stylized waves.

== See also ==
- Badges of the United States Coast Guard
- United States Coast Guard Cutter
