= Good Ol' Boys Roundup =

Whites-only event run by U.S. ATF agents

The Good Ol' Boys Roundup was an annual whites only event run by agents of the Bureau of Alcohol, Tobacco and Firearms in southern Tennessee from 1980 to 1996. A senior manager at the Knoxville U.S. Attorney's Office warned personnel not to attend due to reports of "heavy drinking, strippers, and persons engaging in extramarital affairs". After allegations emerged that a "Ku Klux Klan attitude" pervaded the event a Senate Judiciary Committee was formed to investigate.

== The event ==
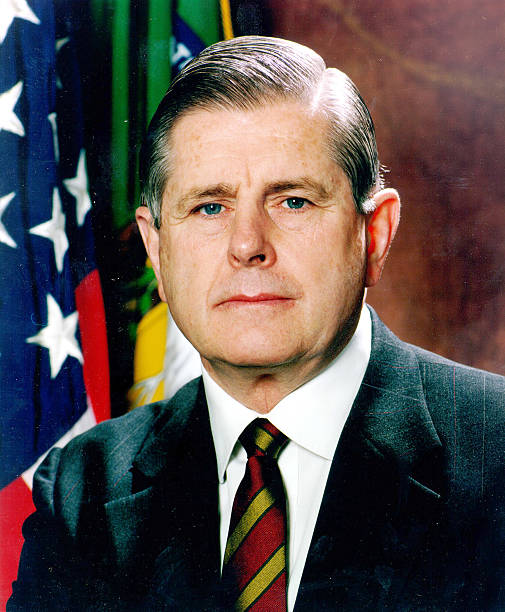
According to ATF director John Magaw, the event had no overtly racist overtones until 1985, although he conceded eight days later that blacks would never have felt welcome at any point.

The founder of the event, ATF agent Raymond Eugene Rightmyer, was "known—or he had been accused—of having racist tendencies." Rightmyer insisted that, although there was racist conduct at the event, he had often tried to halt it.

In its first year 1980, it drew 58 attendees; but by 1994 it had grown to 341 attendees. Around 1980, they moved down river below the dam.

The event grounds consisted of "motor homes, trailers, tents and pickups gathered around a large beer truck". Admission was varyingly charged between $70–90 per person, and law enforcement officers from outside the ATF were allowed to attend if invited by an ATF agent. After the 1995 scandal the Treasury Department banned its agents from attending.

In 1995, Jeff Randall of the Gadsden Minutemen militia infiltrated the event and took clandestine video. The footage resulted in a Washington Times article. The photos and video he took of the event in May 1990 broke open the scandal detailing alleged racist activities at the annual roundup. A Justice Department investigation and congressional probe resulted from the attention. Mike Kemp of the Gadsden Minutemen claimed the only real action taken as a result of the exposure had been threats and "kill the messenger" efforts to discredit his group.

The accusation was later proved to be false as determined by OIG - "Randall's account thus is replete with inaccuracies and is internally inconsistent. His motivation to fabricate evidence appears to be strong, and his allegation is contradicted by more than 200 other witnesses. We therefore find no credible evidence that "nigger hunting licenses" were available at the 1995 Roundup."

The OIG report acknowledges occurrences of racially hostile conduct, but found it not to be pervasive or sanctioned. A non-law enforcement attendee at one of the first events describes the atmosphere as exceptionally drunken, but peaceable, contained, and not overtly racist; the OIG report indicates that as guests and party crashers began to outnumber the law enforcement attendees, that changed.

== Examples of racist exhibitions ==
- A sign at the entrance to the event location noted a "Nigger checkpoint area".
- T-shirts were sold showing Martin Luther King Jr.'s face in sniper crosshairs, O. J. Simpson's head in a noose and black men sprawled across police cruisers with the phrase "Boyz on the Hood" (a play on a John Singleton movie title and a song by Eazy-E).

== Other criminal activity ==
An article in The Philadelphia Inquirer claimed the event consisted of marathon bouts of drinking, and made women feel unsafe. The Senate Subcommittee found evidence of rape. These allegations were made by two hearsay witnesses, and one eye witness. The alleged victim denied having been raped, and the eyewitness later recanted. The Office of Inspector General (OIG) of the Justice Department, in the report cited above, classified the incident as unsubstantiated.

Isolated instances of illegal drugs and untaxed "moonshine" were also alleged, but not fully substantiated.
