= James Loy =

Commandant of the U.S. Coast Guard and Deputy Secretary of Homeland Security

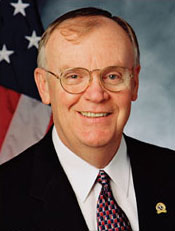

United States Secretary of Homeland Security
- Acting
- In office February 1, 2005 – February 15, 2005
- President: George W. Bush
- Preceded by: Tom Ridge
- Succeeded by: Michael Chertoff

2nd United States Deputy Secretary of Homeland Security
- In office November 4, 2003 – March 1, 2005
- President: George W. Bush
- Preceded by: Gordon R. England
- Succeeded by: Michael P. Jackson

2nd Administrator of the Transportation Security Administration
- In office July 19, 2002 – November 7, 2003
- President: George W. Bush
- Preceded by: John Magaw
- Succeeded by: David M. Stone

21st Commandant of the Coast Guard
- In office May 30, 1998 – May 30, 2002
- President: Bill Clinton; George W. Bush
- Preceded by: Robert E. Kramek
- Succeeded by: Thomas H. Collins

Personal details
- Born: James Milton Loy; August 10, 1942 (age 84) Altoona, Pennsylvania, U.S.
- Party: Independent
- Education: United States Coast Guard Academy (BS); Wesleyan University (MA); University of Rhode Island (MPA)

Military service
- Branch/service: United States Coast Guard
- Years of service: 1964–2002
- Rank: Admiral
- Battles/wars: Vietnam War; Gulf War
- Awards: Transportation Distinguished Service Medal; Coast Guard Distinguished Service Medal (4); Defense Superior Service Medal; Bronze Star (with valor)

James Milton Loy (born August 10, 1942) is a retired admiral of the United States Coast Guard who served as the acting U.S. Secretary of Homeland Security in 2005 and U.S. Deputy Secretary of Homeland Security (DHS) from November 4, 2003, to March 1, 2005. Prior to his appointment as deputy secretary, he served as the second administrator of the Transportation Security Administration from 2002 to 2003, and before that as the commandant of the U.S. Coast Guard from 1998 to 2002. Also in 2004, Loy was elected as a fellow of the National Academy of Public Administration.

== Early life and education ==
Born in Altoona, Pennsylvania, Loy earned the rank of Eagle Scout in the Boy Scouts of America as a youth and was awarded the Distinguished Eagle Scout Award as an adult. Loy entered the United States Coast Guard Academy in 1960. Subsequently, he earned master's degrees in history and government from Wesleyan University, and in Public Administration from University of Rhode Island.

== Career ==
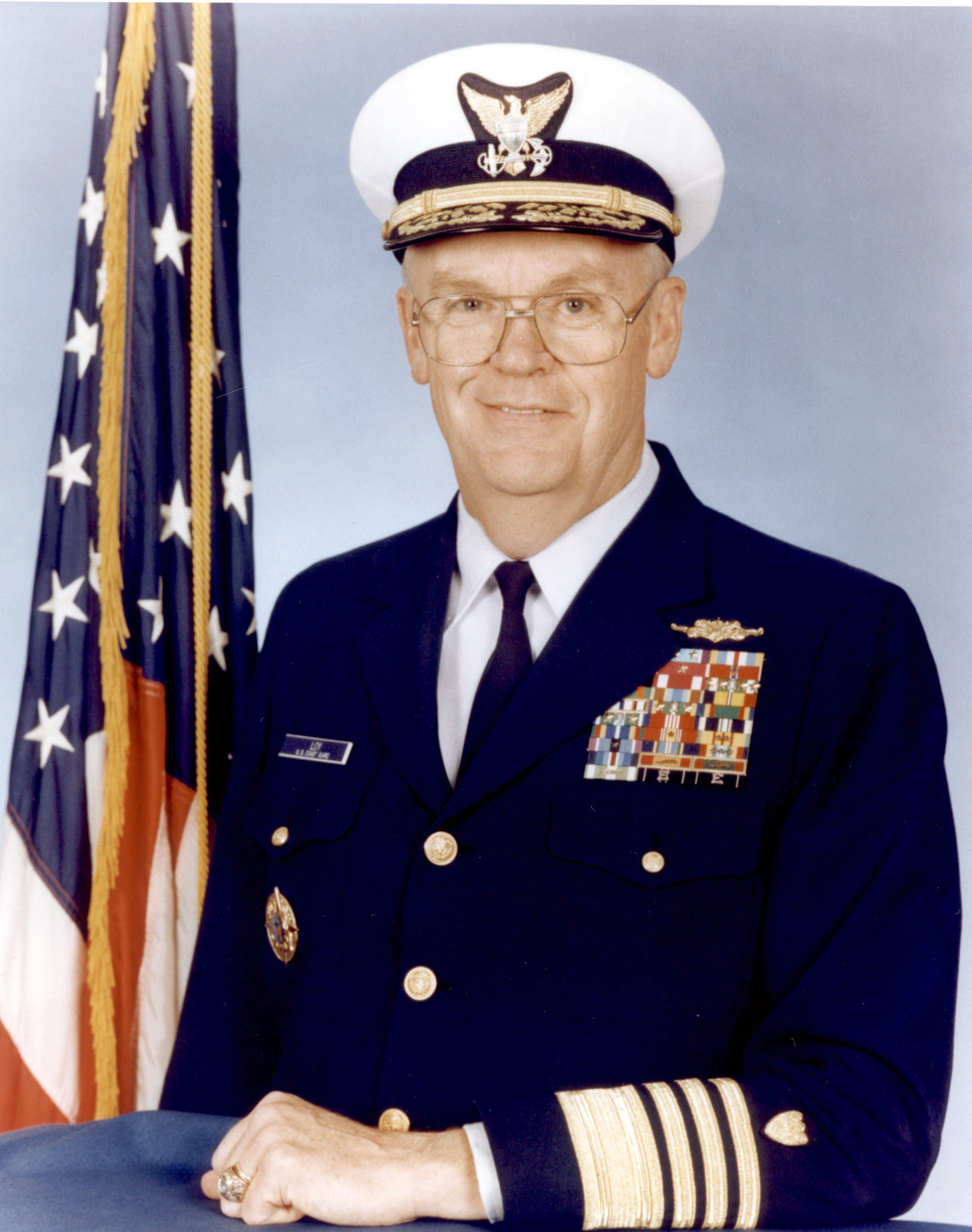
Loy during his tenure as the Commandant of the U.S. Coast Guard

Loy served as a commissioned officer in the U.S. Coast Guard, served in combat as commanding officer of patrol boat USCGC Point Lomas during the Vietnam War, and eventually rose to the rank of admiral. In May 1998, Loy became the twenty first Commandant of the Coast Guard, serving in that post until 2002.

As the USCG Commandant, Loy reacted to the September 11 attacks of 2001. In the short term, he supervised the resumption of sea-borne trade throughout the U.S., after the USCG had shut down most major ports after the attacks. In the long term, Loy led the U.S. delegation to the International Maritime Organization (IMO), and was instrumental in ensuring that the International Ship and Port Facility Security Code was approved and implemented in 2002. The code came into effect in 2004.

In May 2002, the Secretary of the U.S. Department of Transportation, Norman Mineta, appointed Loy to become the Deputy Undersecretary for the newly formed Transportation Security Administration. Loy led the agency through its creation and subsequent incorporation into the Department of Homeland Security.

On October 23, 2003, Loy was nominated as the U.S. Deputy Secretary of Homeland Security by U.S. President George W. Bush, and sworn in on November 4, 2003. Following the departure of Tom Ridge, Loy filled in as Acting Secretary of Homeland Security from February 1, 2005, until February 15, 2005, when Michael Chertoff was confirmed and sworn into office. Joining the exodus of leadership, Loy resigned as Deputy Secretary, effective March 1, 2005.

On April 7, 2005, the Cohen Group announced that Loy had joined the firm as a Senior Counselor, effective April 18. On August 5, 2005, Loy joined the Board of Directors for Lockheed Martin.

In the fall of 2006 it was announced that Loy was being honored as the first Chair of the Tyler Institute for Leadership at the U.S. Coast Guard Academy. As such Loy has played a significant role in speaking and drawing other distinguished visitors to the Academy. His first class was designed to teach a select group of cadets about the international shipping industry and how it might be secured.

In March 2007, The Washington Post had a feature on Loy and his relation to the U.S. Coast Guard's Deepwater contract, which was awarded to Lockheed Martin in summer of 2002. When asked by the Washington Post if he ever faced improper influence on Deepwater decisions while serving as the USCG Commandant, Loy said: "The question is almost insulting. I will pass on giving you any kind of answer."

== Personal ==
In the 2024 United States presidential election, Loy endorsed Kamala Harris.

== Awards and decorations ==
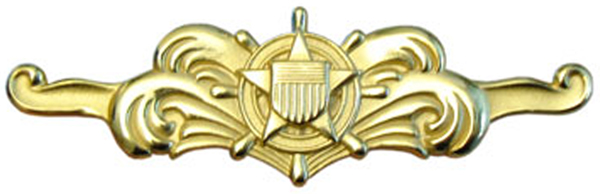

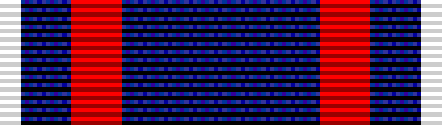

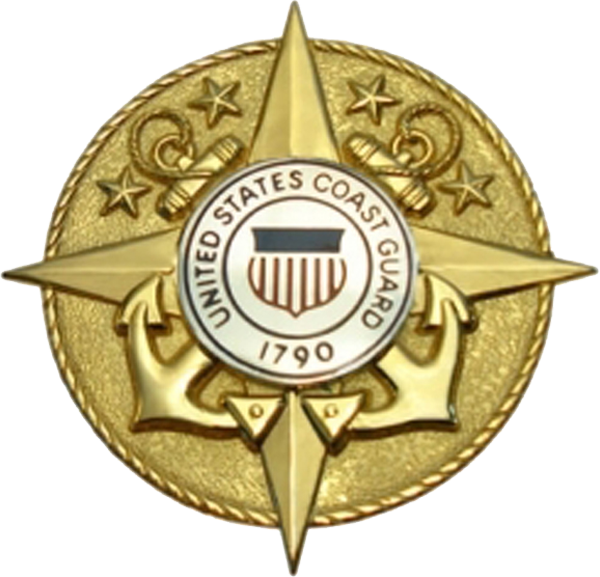

Badge	Cutterman Insignia		
1st row	Transportation Distinguished Service Medal		Coast Guard Distinguished Service Medal with three gold award stars
2nd row	Defense Superior Service Medal	Legion of Merit with one award star	Bronze Star Medal with "V" Device
3rd row	Meritorious Service Medal	Coast Guard Commendation Medal with four award stars and "O" device	Coast Guard Achievement Medal
4th row	Commandant's Letter of Commendation Ribbon	Combat Action Ribbon	Secretary of Transportation Outstanding Unit Award
5th row	Coast Guard Unit Commendation with 2 award stars and "O" device	Navy Unit Commendation	Coast Guard Meritorious Unit Commendation with 2 award stars and "O" device
6th row	Meritorious Team Commendation	Coast Guard "E" Ribbon	Coast Guard Bicentennial Unit Commendation
7th row	National Defense Service Medal with two bronze service stars	Vietnam Service Medal with two service stars	Humanitarian Service Medal with one service star
8th row	Special Operations Service Ribbon	Sea Service Ribbon with three service stars	Restricted Duty Ribbon
9th row	Royal Norwegian Order of Merit, Commander with Star	Vietnam Gallantry Cross Unit Citation	Vietnam Civil Actions Unit Citation
10th row	Vietnam Campaign Medal	Expert Rifle Marksmanship Medal	Expert Pistol Marksmanship Medal
Badge	Commandant Staff Badge		

- Admiral Loy is a recipient of the Distinguished Eagle Scout Award.

== Post career activities ==
In 2020, Loy, along with over 130 other former Republican national security officials, signed a statement that asserted that President Trump was unfit to serve another term, and "To that end, we are firmly convinced that it is in the best interest of our nation that Vice President Joe Biden be elected as the next President of the United States, and we will vote for him."

In July 2022, Loy joined with other former U.S. military leaders in condemning former president and commander in chief, Donald Trump. "While rioters tried to thwart the peaceful transfer of power and ransacked the Capitol on Jan. 6, 2021, the president and commander in chief, Donald Trump, abdicated his duty to preserve, protect and defend the Constitution.

== See also ==
- Commandant of the United States Coast Guard
- List of Eagle Scouts

Military offices
Preceded by Robert Kramek	Commandant of the Coast Guard; 1998–2002	Succeeded by Thomas Collins
Political offices
Preceded by John Magaw	2nd Administrator of the Transportation Security Administration; 2002–2003	Succeeded by David Stone
Preceded by Gordon England	United States Deputy Secretary of Homeland Security; 2003–2005	Succeeded by Michael Jackson
Preceded by Tom Ridge	United States Secretary of Homeland Security; Acting; 2005	Succeeded by Michael Chertoff
