= Thomas H. Collins =

Commandant of the United States Coast Guard

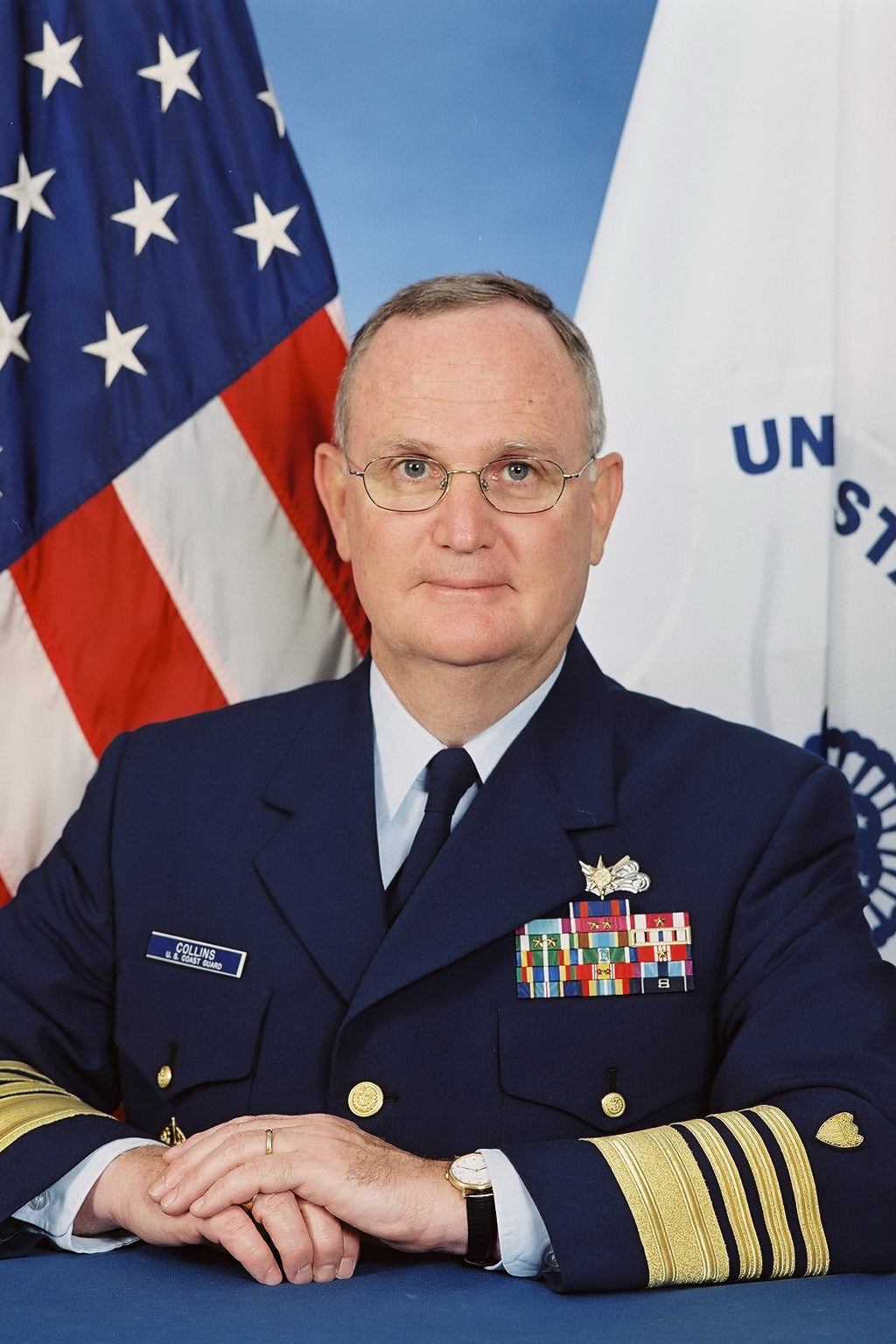
- Official portrait, 2002
- Born: 25 June 1946 (age 80); Stoughton, Massachusetts, U.S.
- Education: U.S. Coast Guard Academy; Wesleyan University (MA); University of New Haven (MBA)
- Military career
- Allegiance: United States
- Branch: United States Coast Guard
- Service years: 1968–2006
- Rank: Admiral
- Commands: Commandant of the Coast Guard; Pacific Area and Eleventh Coast Guard District; USCGC Cape Morgan (WPB-95313)
- Conflicts: September 11 attacks
- Other work: SPADAC, Inc., SureID, USIS Inc., Terma North America, U.S. Coast Guard Foundation

Thomas Hansen Collins (born 25 June 1946) is a former admiral of the United States Coast Guard who served as the 22nd commandant from May 2002 to May 2006.

== Early life and education ==
A native of Stoughton, Massachusetts, Collins graduated from the U.S. Coast Guard Academy in 1968 and later served as a faculty member within the Humanities Department. He earned a Master of Arts degree in Liberal Studies from Wesleyan University and a Master of Business Administration from the University of New Haven.

== Career ==
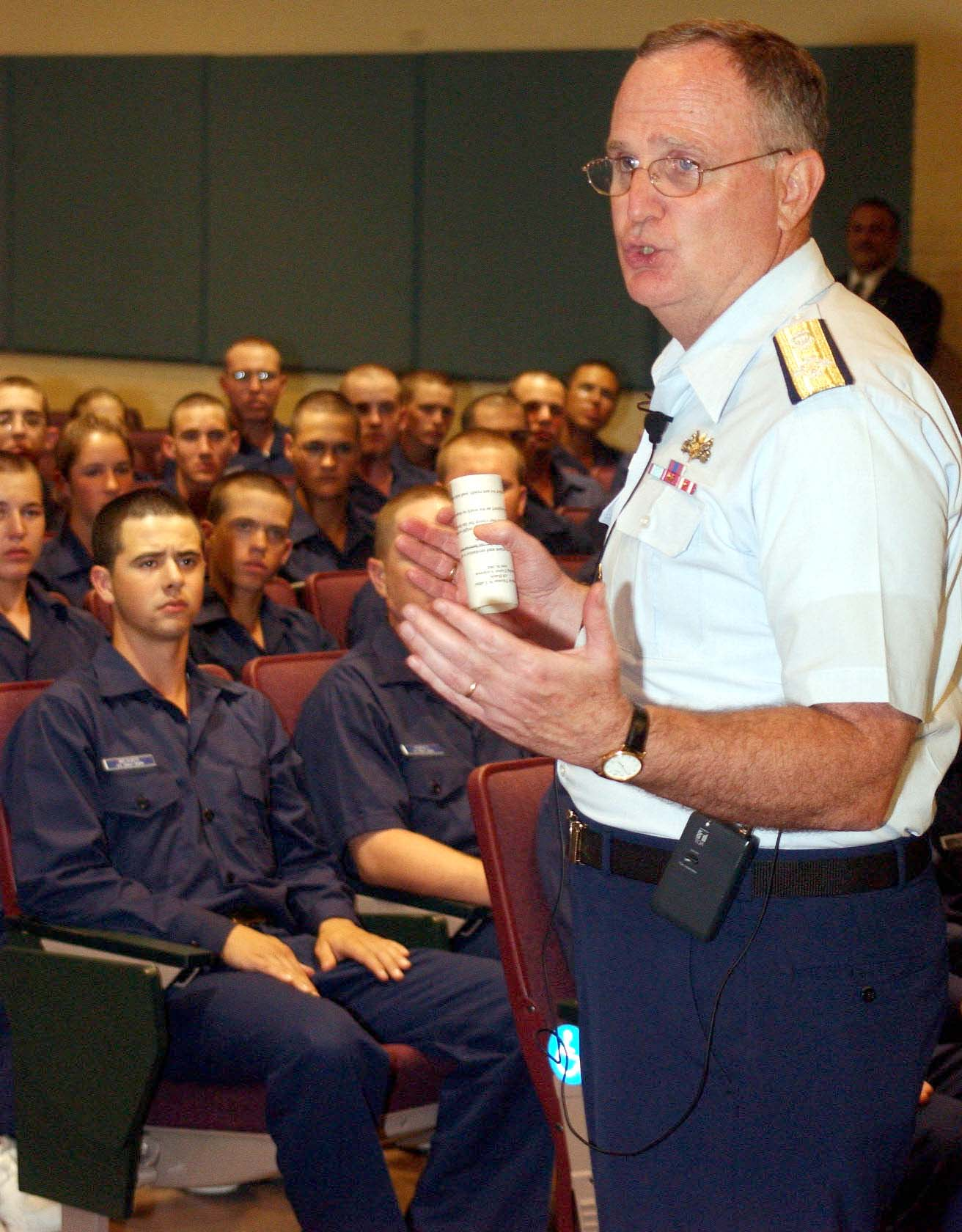
Collins orating before an audience of U.S. Coast Guard recruits at Recruit Training Center Cape May in June 2004

=== U.S. Coast Guard ===
Collins started his U.S. Coast Guard career as a deck watch officer and first lieutenant aboard the cutter Vigilant. Following that assignment, he served a two-year tour as commanding officer of the cutter USCGC Cape Morgan, a patrol boat homeported in Charleston, South Carolina. His shore operational assignments include Deputy Commander, Group St. Petersburg, Florida, and Commander of Coast Guard Group and Captain of the Port, Long Island Sound, in New Haven, Connecticut.

Prior to his promotion to Flag Officer in 1994, he served as Chief, Programs Division at Coast Guard Headquarters, and then as Deputy Chief of Staff of the Coast Guard.

From 1998 to 2000 he served as Commander, Pacific Area and Eleventh Coast Guard District, where he developed the successful Coast Guard response to the increase in illegal drug and migrant smuggling traffic in the Eastern Pacific. His other flag assignments include serving as Commander, Fourteenth Coast Guard District in Honolulu, Hawaii and Chief, Office of Acquisition at Coast Guard Headquarters where he managed the acquisition of twelve major systems worth nearly $3 billion and laid the foundation for the ill-fated Integrated Deepwater System project, which was intended to modernize the ships, aircraft and sensors that the Coast Guard uses to perform its many open ocean missions.

==== Vice Commandant of the U.S. Coast Guard ====
Prior to becoming Commandant, Collins served as Vice Commandant of the United States Coast Guard, the number two post, from 2000 to 2002 where he created the Innovation Council, spearheaded service-wide process improvement initiatives and directed system enhancements as the Coast Guard Acquisition Executive.

==== Commandant of the U.S. Coast Guard ====
Collins served as the 22nd Commandant of the Coast Guard from May 2002 to May 2006, and guided the U.S. Coast Guard in the aftermath of the September 11 attacks of 2001. As part of this effort to tighten maritime security, Collins encouraged people involved in the maritime industry and the recreational boating industry to report suspicious activity to the National Response Center. This program was extended and formalized as America's Waterway Watch in 2005.

== Other activities ==
Collins has served as a director on the boards of numerous companies such as EID Passport Inc., USIS Inc., and Terma North America, and the U.S. Coast Guard Foundation. He consults in areas of national security and maritime security, safety, and environmental protection.

He served on the board of SPADAC from 2007 to 2010 as a key independent director, having been recruited by CEO Mark Dumas to provide balance to the board after SPADAC raised $7.5M in Venture Capital. SPADAC later was renamed to GeoEye Analytics, Inc. after its acquisition then ultimately DigitalGlobe Analytics, Inc. (NYSE: DGI).

== Awards and decorations ==
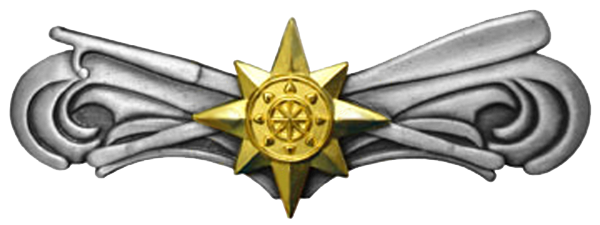

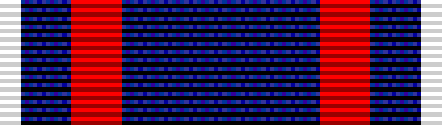

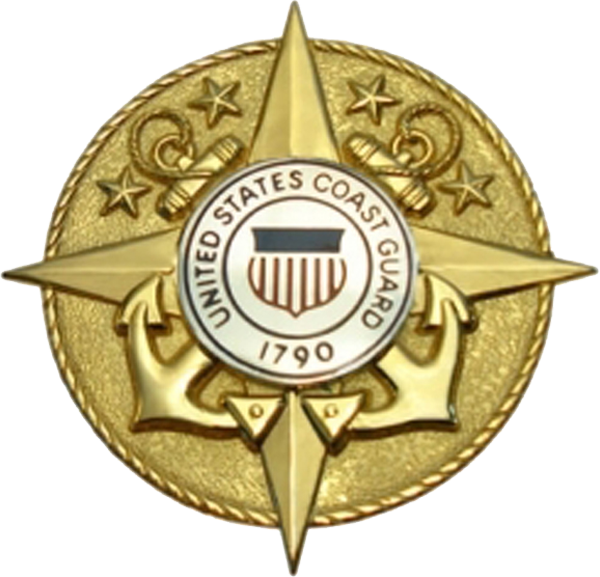

Badge	Advanced Boat Force Operations Insignia		
1st Row	Homeland Security Distinguished Service Medal	Transportation Distinguished Service Medal	Defense Distinguished Service Medal
2nd Row	Coast Guard Distinguished Service Medal	Legion of Merit with 2 gold award stars	Meritorious Service Medal with gold award star
3rd Row	Coast Guard Commendation Medal with 2 gold award stars	Commandant's Letter of Commendation Ribbon	Secretary of Transportation Outstanding Unit Award
4th Row	Coast Guard Unit Commendation	Coast Guard Meritorious Unit Commendation with "O" device	Meritorious Team Commendation with 1 award star
5th Row	Coast Guard Bicentennial Unit Commendation	National Defense Service Medal with 2 bronze service stars	Humanitarian Service Medal
6th row	Special Operations Service Ribbon	Sea Service Ribbon	Pistol Marksmanship Ribbon with silver sharpshooter device
Badge	Commandant Staff Badge		

Military offices
Preceded by James Loy	Commandant of the Coast Guard; 2002—2006	Succeeded by Thad W. Allen
Preceded by James C. Card	Vice Commandant of the Coast Guard; 2000—2002	Succeeded by Thomas J. Barrett
