= Violent Crime Impact Teams =

Bureau of Alcohol, Tobacco, Firearms, and Explosives
- (ATF)
- ATF Logo

Violent Crime Impact Teams (VCIT) in the United States work proactively to identify, disrupt, arrest and prosecute dangerous criminals through innovative technology, analytical investigative resources and an integrated federal, state and local law enforcement strategy along with the leading federal law enforcement agency for the VCIT, the Bureau of Alcohol, Tobacco, Firearms and Explosives (ATF) (an agency within the United States Department of Justice).

== Background ==
In June 2004, Attorney General John Ashcroft, Deputy Attorney General James Comey, and Carl J. Truscott, director of the ATF, announced a federal initiative aimed at reducing crime in 15 cities in the United States through the development of VCIT. The cities include:

- Albuquerque, New Mexico
- Baltimore, Maryland
- Chattanooga, Tennessee
- Columbus, Ohio
- Greensboro, North Carolina
- Las Vegas, Nevada
- Los Angeles, California
- Miami, Florida
- Philadelphia, Pennsylvania
- Pittsburgh, Pennsylvania
- Richmond, Virginia
- Tampa, Florida
- Tucson, Arizona
- Tulsa, Oklahoma
- Washington, D.C.

The VCIT launched as a pilot program built on the success of Project Safe Neighborhoods (PSN), a comprehensive nationwide strategy geared toward combating gun crime in communities across the country. In March 2005, Attorney General Alberto Gonzales announced the selection of five additional cities (Hartford, Connecticut, Houston, Texas, Fresno, California, Camden, New Jersey, and New Orleans, Louisiana) to participate in the VCIT program.

=== Goals and objectives ===
The goal of the VCIT initiative includes decreasing the number of homicides, firearms-related homicides, violent crimes, and the number of violent firearms crimes. Two primary purposes of the VCIT initiative, as articulated by the Office of the Deputy Attorney General (ODAG) and ATF, aim to seek to reduce homicides and violent firearms crimes in cities where these rates disproved the national downward trend and to test the effectiveness of the VCIT strategy in reducing, rather than displacing, the incidents of firearms-related violence in communities by identifying, targeting, and arresting the "worst" violent offenders in specific targeted areas. When responding to firearms-related crime scenes, including homicides, VCIT members assist the local police by investigating all firearms-related leads and ensuring traced firearms evidence.

== Strategy ==
VCIT takes a six-point approach for reducing violent crime:

1. Use technology and human intelligence to identify geographic areas with violent firearms crime
2. Identify the worst violent offenders, support for criminal organizations, and armed career criminals
3. Use criminal investigations and investigative tools to disrupt criminal activity
4. Arrest and prosecute individuals and associates in federal or state jurisdiction looking at maximum penalty
5. Work with community leaders to develop a valuable commitment between the community residents and law enforcement
6. Evaluate results regularly to assess VCIT progress toward achieving the goals

=== Composition ===
VCIT consists of federal agents and support personnel working with state and local law enforcement, producing interdependent benefits and powerful technology of all participating agencies. In addition to the ATF, The Drug Enforcement Administration, U.S. Marshals Service, federal and state prosecutors, state and local law enforcement officers, and federal and state parole officers may participate in the VCIT program.

=== Partnerships ===
Partnerships are deemed essential for VCIT. Federal, state, and local law enforcement agencies actively work together through patrolling and conducting proactive investigations to improve prevention efforts through targeted outreach efforts within at-risk communities. In addition, resources in the communities, such as community leaders and social service agencies, provide help for VCIT. The partnerships cultivate positive relationships between law enforcement and communities, resulting in stronger existing partnerships and new relationships forming. The VCIT routinely and systematically analyzes problems before developing solutions by utilizing a partnered problem-solving process.

== ATF Commitment ==
Federal, State, and local partners must work with an understanding of the knowledge of ATF capabilities available to them in support of their local enforcement efforts. ATF commits to distributing new technologies and investigative advances to help suppress violent criminals in VCIT cities. These tools increase the ability to collect, analyze, and disseminate data, increasing the likelihood for identifying violent crime areas, targeting individuals accountable for firearms-related crime, and improving the quality of life in communities. Technology, such as the National Integrated Ballistic Information Network (NIBIN), Crime Gun Analysis Branch (CGAB), and the National Field Office Case Information System (NFOCIS), helps accomplish the goals of the VCIT initiative.

== Results ==
More than 2,000 arrests of individuals possessing firearms and other criminals, received local, state or federal charges through the program in 2006. The VCIT arrested 650 of the "worst" offenders and the team recovered more than 4,900 firearms. In 2006, the VCIT program added five cities (Atlanta, Georgia, Baton Rouge, Louisiana, Birmingham, Alabama, Laredo, Texas and Milwaukee, Wisconsin).

=== Best Practice Report: Success ===
The "Best Practice Report" identifies the specific practices contributing most to the program's success. In addition, the analysis is essential to strengthen future VCIT deployments. The ten "Best Practice" implementations include:

1. Set clear goals and measure performance
2. Develop collaborative partnerships with local police
3. Target the "worst" criminals
4. Use the full array of intelligence assets
5. Maintain a dynamic approach when targeting offenders and hot spots
6. Conduct proactive street enforcement with local police in targeted hot spots
7. Deploy resources during peak hours of criminal activity
8. Investigate the sources of firearms linked to violent crime
9. Prioritize prosecution of defendants linked to targeted hot spots
10. Publicize success stories

=== Office of the Inspector General Review: Recommendations ===
According to the Office of the Inspector General, the ATF did develop objectives for the VCIT Strategy (six- point approach) to combat violent firearms crime, but the ATF did not execute the Strategy, primarily due to ATF's inconsistent oversight of its Field Divisions on adapting the VCIT Strategy to local operations. The ATF did not develop an adequate evaluation strategy to measure the performance of the VCIT initiative, and ATF's analysis of the data it collected does not support its claims of success. As a result, although the Strategy on paper appears effective, after 24 months of operations and the allotment of more than $35 million in funds for VCIT, ATF cannot definitively show whether the initiative successfully reduced firearms crime in areas with high levels of violent crime.

For 2006, ATF received $20 million to expand the VCIT initiative. The ATF should execute the program consistent with its VCIT Strategy allowing the ATF to determine whether the Strategy deems successful. To accomplish this, recommendations for the ATF include:

- Establish detailed operational guidelines for VCIT implementation, and provide training for ATF Special Agents in Charge and VCIT Coordinators on modifying the VCIT initiative to local crime problems.
- Develop and implement a pre-deployment evaluation for potential VCIT locations to determine the probable applicability of VCIT to local violent crime problems.
- Develop and execute an adequate evaluation strategy to assess VCIT performance and impact on violent firearms crime.
- For existing VCITs, create interagency agreements with federal and local partner agencies defining resource and operational responsibilities.
- Establish management authority and responsibility for overseeing the implementation and evaluation of local VCIT operations in accordance with the VCIT Strategy.

== Additions to VCIT ==
New designated cities became the target of federal violent crime task forces. New legislation strengthens federal laws, targeting violent criminals as part of the department's expanding efforts to fight violent crime. In 2007, the VCIT initiative added four cities, including Mesa, Arizona, Orlando, Florida, San Bernardino, California, and San Juan, Puerto Rico. Currently, VCIT target 31 U.S. cities.

The Violent Crime and Anti-Terrorism Act of 2007 proposes to effectively fight violent crime. The comprehensive package includes violent crime legislation strengthening existing laws to ensure federal law enforcement agencies the power to successfully investigate and prosecute many types of violent crime. One of the provisions, Improving Violent Crime Prevention and Strengthening Anti-Gang Measures, amends several criminal statutes to strengthen penalties and existing tools used to combat violent crime, including firearms and gang violence. In addition, the Flexible Penalties for Firearms Dealers' Violations of the Gun Control Act, provides additional flexibility in the penalties imposed on federal firearms licensees (FFLs) violating the Gun Control Act.

== See also ==
- Violent Crime Control and Law Enforcement Act
- Community Oriented Policing Services
