= Overseas Service Ribbon =

Award of the United States armed forces

An Overseas Service Ribbon is a service military award of the United States military which recognizes those service members who have performed military tours outside the borders of the United States of America. There are different versions of the Overseas Service Ribbons for the U.S. Army, U.S. Navy, U.S. Air Force, U.S. Space Force, and the U.S. Coast Guard. Both the U.S. Navy and the U.S. Marines receive the Navy and Marine Corps Overseas Service Ribbon.

Army Overseas Service Ribbon	Navy and Marine Corps Overseas Service Ribbon	Air and Space Overseas Long Tour Service Ribbon	Air and Space Overseas Short Tour Service Ribbon	Coast Guard Overseas Service Ribbon	Army Reserve Components Overseas Training Ribbon
Next Higher: Army Service Ribbon	Next Higher: Navy Arctic Service Ribbon	Next Higher: Air and Space Overseas Short Tour Ribbon	Next Higher: Air Force Nuclear Deterrence Operations Service Medal	Next Higher: Restricted Duty Ribbon	Next Higher: Army Overseas Service Ribbon
Next Lower: Army Reserve Components Overseas Training Ribbon	Next Lower: Navy Recruiting Service Ribbon	Next Lower: Air and Space Expeditionary Service Ribbon	Next Lower: Air and Space Overseas Long Tour Ribbon	Next Lower: Basic Training Honor Graduate Ribbon	Next Lower: None

== Army ==
The Army Overseas Service Ribbon was first issued in August 1981. It is presented to any member of the United States Army who completes a standard overseas tour of duty.

The length of a standard tour is dependent upon the duty location and whether the Soldier is accompanied or unaccompanied with a spouse/family member(s). The tour in question may be cut one month short due to manning requirements (not due to Soldier misconduct) and still receive full credit for the tour length. There are two types of tour designations, long tours (24+ months) and short tours (6–23 months). Anything shorter than 6 months is considered TDY (Temporary Duty Assignment). The standard unaccompanied Korean tour is 12 months, and accompanied is 36 months. The German tour is 36 months for unaccompanied and accompanied. Combat tours are typically 6–12 months and can extend beyond during critical periods. The Iraqi Surge campaign tour was 15 months.

On the 11 December 2006 revision of AR 600-8-22 (Military Awards), the Army eliminated the policy which had restricted the awarding of the Overseas Service Ribbon when another campaign or service medal is awarded.

Additional awards of the Army Overseas Service Ribbon are denoted by award numerals. For those Army service members performing overseas duty prior to 1981, the Army Overseas Service Ribbon may be awarded retroactively, provided that a service member was on active duty subsequent to 1981.

For time served in designated combat zones, the Army also issues an Overseas Service Bar.

== Navy and Marine Corps ==
The Navy and Marine Corps Overseas Service Ribbon was first proposed in 1968, but not authorized until 17 September 1986. The ribbon is awarded to any member of the Navy or Marine Corps who completes one year of consecutive or cumulative duty at a permanent overseas duty station.

For inactive members of the reserve components, the first award is authorized upon completion of either 30 consecutive or 45 cumulative days of overseas duty, regardless of the type of orders. For subsequent awards, the criteria of award for reservists are the same as the active duty members criteria.

In 1999, a directive of the Chief of Naval Operations permitted those personnel stationed on overseas homeported naval vessels to receive the Navy and Marine Corps Overseas Service Ribbon. Prior to this time, such personnel were only eligible to receive the Sea Service Deployment Ribbon. Current regulations now permit the receipt of both ribbons for the same tour of duty.

Additional awards of the Navy and Marine Corps Overseas Service Ribbon are denoted by service stars.

The Sea Service Deployment Ribbon (SSDR) and Navy and Marine Corps Overseas Service Ribbon (OSR) will be awarded to IAs deploying to Afghanistan (OEF) and Iraq (OIF) in accordance with SECNAVINST 1650.1H. However, the OEF and OIF AOEs may be qualifying areas for either ribbon, depending upon the circumstances of the individual. The following amplifying guidance is provided.

- The 12-month accumulated sea duty requirement for the SSDR is waived for OEF (11 Sep 1 – TBD) and OIF (19 Mar 2003 – TBD) to qualify for the initial award of the ribbon only. The 12-month requirement still applies for second and subsequent awards.
- Individuals with subsequent deployments to the OEF or OIF AOEs may elect to use that deployment time towards qualifying for EITHER a subsequent SSDR or the OSR. The member must elect in writing which ribbon the subsequent deployment time will be credited towards, and may NOT divide the deployment time between the two ribbons. The entire deployment time will be credited towards ONE of the ribbons.

== Air Force and Space Force ==
The Air and Space Overseas Service Ribbon (ASOR) was approved in 1980 by order of General Lew Allen, Air Force Chief of Staff. The award is issued in two grades, being that of "short tour" and "long tour." On 16 November 2020, the Air Force Overseas Service Ribbon was renamed to the Air and Space Overseas Service Ribbon by the Secretary of the Air Force.

The Air and Space Overseas Short Tour Service Ribbon is awarded for less than two years of duty or as directed by Department of the Air Force policies. Normally, the Short Tour Service Ribbon is awarded for a permanent duty assignment of at least 300 days within an 18-month time span; such assignments are generally served unaccompanied by family members, though a short tour assignment need not be unaccompanied. Historically, most Short Tour Service Ribbons were awarded for service in South Korea, by far the most common short tour assignment in the USAF. From June 2003 until April 2011, Airmen serving in hostile environments for 181 days or more qualified for the Short Tour Service Ribbon under a temporary exception to rules outlined in AFI 36–2110. However, this exemption was rescinded by General Norton A. Schwartz in April 2011 and Airmen will no longer qualify for the award if they arrive in a hostile environment on or after 1 July 2011.

The Air and Space Overseas Long Tour Service Ribbon is issued for completion of a standard overseas service assignment of two years or more in length with additional awards denoted by oak leaf clusters. Long tour credit is awarded for completion of an overseas long tour (2 years) prescribed by Department of the Air Force Instructions, or to any member assigned to a United States or overseas location who is subsequently sent under temporary duty orders (to include combat tours) for 365 or more days within a 3-year time frame.

Additional awards of the Air and Space Overseas Service Ribbon are denoted by oak leaf clusters and Department of the Air Force regulations permit the receipt and wear of both the short and long tour ribbons simultaneously, wherein the short tour ribbon takes a higher precedence by being worn to the wearer's right of the long tour ribbon. The "A" device is authorized only on the short tour ribbon to any service member who performs a tour of duty at an arctic based Air Force or Space Force facility; most commonly Pituffik Space Base in Greenland.

== Coast Guard ==
The Coast Guard Overseas Service Ribbon was approved on 28 October 2009 with details announced on 29 April 2010. It is awarded to active duty members on a permanent assignment and who successfully complete a tour of duty of at least 12 months at an overseas shore-based duty station or on board a cutter permanently assigned to an overseas area. It is also awarded to reservists who are permanently assigned and have satisfactorily completed a minimum of 36 cumulative days of service at an overseas duty station during each 12-month period of the total tour of duty.

Duty on board U.S.-based deploying ships or units does not qualify. Personnel who are eligible to receive the Coast Guard's Restricted Duty Ribbon are not eligible to receive the Overseas Service Ribbon for the same period. The ribbon may be awarded retroactively to qualifying individuals for initial award only. Subsequent awards are authorized, and are indicated by small bronze or silver service stars.

== Army Reserve Components Overseas Training Ribbon ==
The Army Reserve Components Overseas Training Ribbon (ARCOTR) was established by the United States Secretary of the Army (SECARMY) on 11 July 1984 as announced in DAGO 1990–15. It is awarded to members of the Reserve Component (RC) of the Army (ARNG and USAR), for successful completion of annual training or ADT for a period not less than 10 consecutive duty days on foreign soil. All ARNG and USAR Soldiers who accompany the RC unit (including unit cells) to which they are assigned or attached as active duty for operational support during overseas training are also eligible for the award. Effective 11 July 1984, all members of the ARNG and USAR are eligible for this award if they were active Reserve status members of the ARNG, USAR (not on active duty in the Active Army), or AGR Soldiers at the time their unit underwent annual training or ADT on foreign soil. Additional awards are denoted by numerals.

The Army Reserve and Army National Guard are the only reserve components which issue an overseas ribbon for training outside of the United States.
