= James Lee Witt =

American politician

James Witt
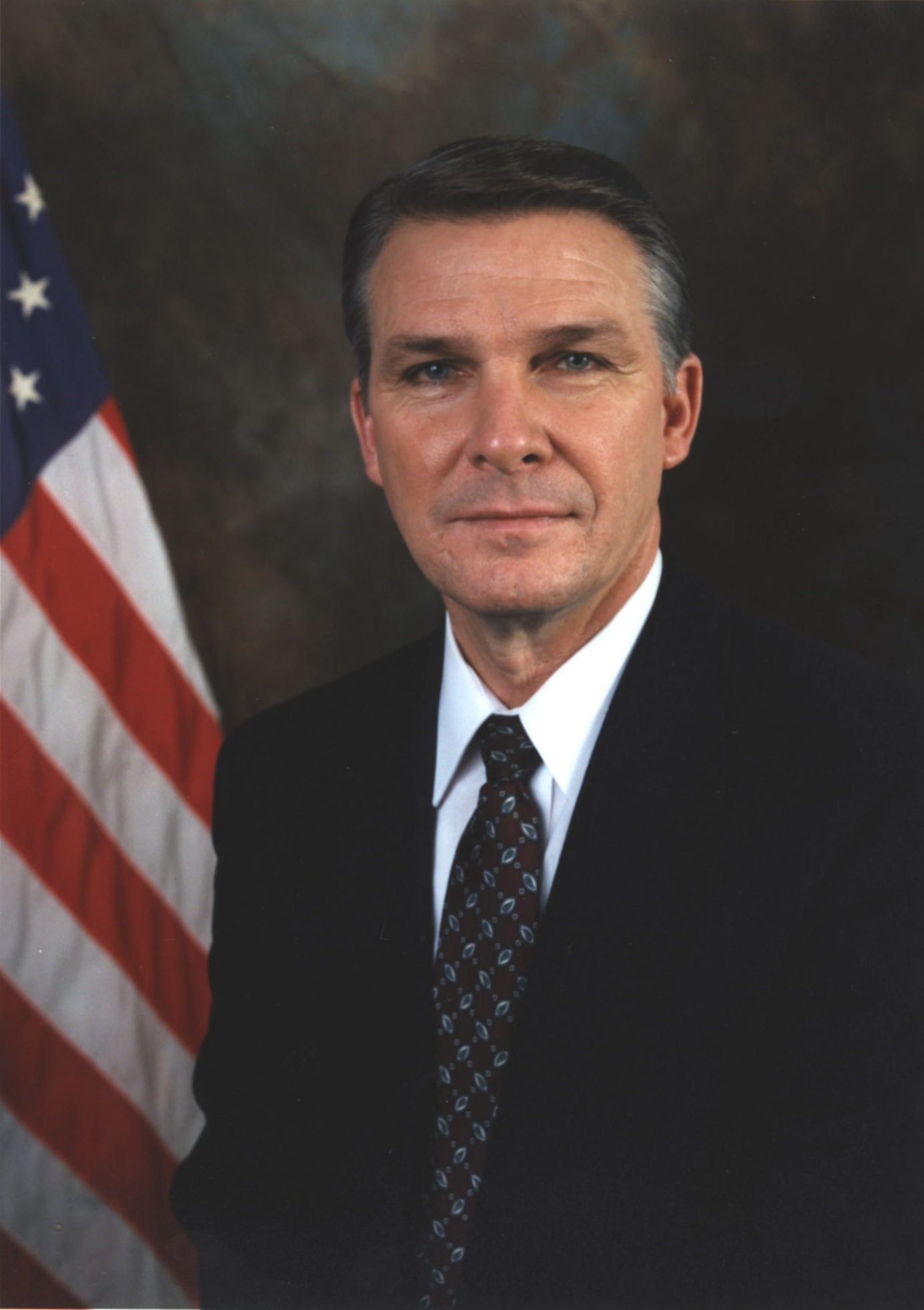

Director of the Federal Emergency Management Agency
- In office April 5, 1993 – January 20, 2001
- President: Bill Clinton
- Preceded by: William Tidball (acting)
- Succeeded by: John Magaw (acting)

Personal details
- Born: January 6, 1944 (age 82) Paris, Arkansas, U.S.
- Party: Democratic
- Witt's voice Recorded in 1996.

James Lee Witt (born January 6, 1944) is a former director of the Federal Emergency Management Agency (FEMA) during the tenure of U.S. President Bill Clinton, and is often credited with raising the agency's level of professionalism and ability to respond to disasters.

== Early life ==
Witt was born in Paris, Arkansas, and was raised in Dardanelle, in Yell County, Arkansas. He and Clinton met as boys in Little League. He founded a construction business in 1968. At 34, he was elected County Judge of Yell County. Witt was re-elected to the post six times and was recognized by the National Association of Counties for his work. Witt was a charter Board Chairman of Child Development Inc., which works to advance Head Start programs.

== Government career ==
In 1988, shortly after being reelected county Judge, an administrative position he had held for ten years, Witt was appointed by then-Governor Bill Clinton to be the head of the Arkansas Office of Emergency Services. There he reorganized the state's emergency management process. Clinton subsequently moved the new Fire Protection Services Program to OES, including the board and the grant program, which was administered in conjunction with the state Insurance Department."

When Clinton was elected president, he appointed Witt to head FEMA, for which Witt was confirmed by the U.S. Senate in 1993. In 1996, FEMA was given cabinet rank.

During his tenure Witt was able to overcome FEMA's previously poor reputation. A 1992 interim report by the Congress (prior to Hurricane Andrew, which led to further criticism of FEMA) had said, "FEMA is widely viewed as a political dumping ground, a turkey farm, if you will, where large numbers of positions exist that can be conveniently and quietly filled by political appointment ..." The comment had been provoked by the appointment of Wallace Stickney, described in the report as "weak" and "uninterested in the substantive programs of FEMA" owing his post to his relationship with former White House Chief of Staff John H. Sununu.

By 1996, an Atlanta Journal-Constitution editorial said, "FEMA has developed a sterling reputation for delivering disaster-relief services, a far cry from its abysmal standing before James Lee Witt took its helm in 1993. How did Witt turn FEMA around so quickly? Well, he is the first director of the agency to have emergency-management experience. He stopped the staffing of the agency by political patronage. He removed layers of bureaucracy. Most important, he instilled in the agency a spirit of preparedness, of service to the customer, of willingness to listen to ideas of local and state officials to make the system work better."

Witt's eight-year term in office saw approximately 348 Presidentially declared disaster areas in more than 6,500 counties and in all 50 states and the U.S. territories. Witt supervised the response to the 1997 Red River flood— a devastating flood in the Dakotas—the most costly earthquake, and a dozen serious hurricanes.

== Post-FEMA management and consulting ==
On September 3, 2005, he was hired by Louisiana Governor Kathleen Blanco to oversee reconstruction efforts in the wake of Hurricane Katrina. In December 2005, the University of Texas System hired his firm to prepare, process, and recover claims for damages from FEMA related to natural disasters. Witt served as CEO of the International Code Council, which sets international standards for building construction, 2003-06.

By August 2007, Witt was serving on the management team of Global Options Group LLC and as President of James Lee Witt Associates LLC, which provided consulting on emergency and disaster preparedness to local and state governments. In 2013, the firm merged with O'Brien's Response Management to become Witt|O'Brien's, with Witt as Executive Board Chair. In 2015, it was acquired by SEACOR.

In 2016, Witt formed Witt Global Partners, a Little Rock-based Government Relations and Disaster Consulting Firm. Witt is the CEO and Managing Partner of the firm.

== Electoral career ==
Witt was mentioned as a potential candidate for Governor of Arkansas in 1997 but took himself out of consideration and stayed at FEMA until he was replaced by Joe Allbaugh, the first appointee of President George W. Bush. Witt announced in October 2013 that he expected to run for Congress in 2014 in Arkansas's 4th congressional district. On November 4, 2014 Witt lost the race to GOP candidate Bruce Westerman 53.7% to 42.6%.

Political offices
Preceded by William Tidball; Acting	Director of the Federal Emergency Management Agency; 1993–2001	Succeeded by John Magaw; Acting
