= Kenneth Charles Canterbury Jr. =

American police officer

Chuck Canterbury
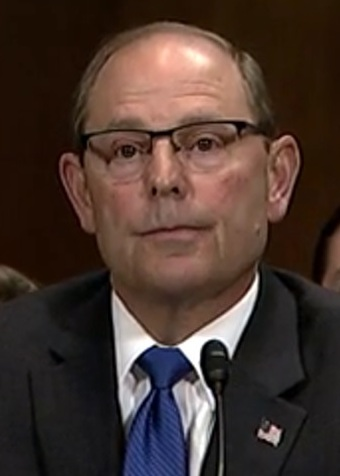

Personal details
- Born: Kenneth Charles Canterbury Jr. Myrtle Beach, South Carolina, U.S.
- Spouse: Linda Alexander
- Children: 2
- Education: Coastal Carolina University (BA)

Kenneth Charles "Chuck" Canterbury Jr. is the immediate past president of the national Fraternal Order of Police that was nominated by President Trump to be Director of the Bureau of Alcohol, Tobacco, Firearms and Explosives.

== Education ==
Canterbury earned a bachelor's degree in Interdisciplinary Studies from the Coastal Carolina University.

== Career ==
Canterbury served as police officer in the Horry County Police Department starting in 1978, earning the rank of major after serving in the patrol division, criminal division and training division over a period of 26 years. Canterbury served on the Executive Board of the National Fraternal Order of Police for over two decades and has been serving as President since 2003. Due to his ATF nomination, Canterbury did not seek re-election. Patrick Yoes won the 2019 election to succeed Canterbury at the organization biannual conference in August 2019 in New Orleans, LA.

=== Bureau of Alcohol, Tobacco, Firearms and Explosives ===
On May 24, 2019, President Trump announced his intent to nominate Canterbury to be Director of the Bureau of Alcohol, Tobacco, Firearms and Explosives. On July 31, 2019, a hearing on his nomination was held before the Senate Judiciary Committee. His nomination was not voted upon by the Senate Judiciary Committee and was returned to the president on January 3, 2020.

The President appointed him to serve as a Senior Advisor on Law Enforcement in the office of the Deputy Attorney General.

On February 12, 2020, President Trump renominated Canterbury. On May 19, 2020, President Trump withdrew his nomination following opposition of some Republican senators.

== Personal life ==
Canterbury lives in Conway, South Carolina. He has 2 children, 3 grandchildren, and 2 great-grandson’s.
