= Rex D. Davis =

American government official

Rex Davis

1st Director of the Bureau of Alcohol, Tobacco, and Firearms
- In office 1970 – July 1, 1978
- President: Richard Nixon; Gerald Ford; Jimmy Carter
- Preceded by: Position established July 1, 1972 (formerly IRS ATF Division)
- Succeeded by: G.R. Dickerson

Personal details
- Born: Rex Darwin Davis; June 11, 1924 Skiatook, Oklahoma, U.S.
- Died: January 7, 2008 (aged 83) Bethesda, Maryland, U.S.
- Resting place: Arlington National Cemetery
- Children: 2
- Education: University of Oklahoma (LL.B)

Military service
- Branch/service: United States Army
- Rank: First Lieutenant
- Battles/wars: World War II

Rex Darwin Davis (June 11, 1924 – January 7, 2008) was an American law enforcement official who served as the first director of the Bureau of Alcohol, Tobacco, and Firearms, which later became known as the Bureau of Alcohol, Tobacco, Firearms and Explosives.

== Early life and education ==
Davis was born June 11, 1924, in Skiatook, Oklahoma. He studied at the University of Oklahoma in 1942, though his education was interrupted by World War II. During his time in the military, he flew thirty-three combat missions with the Eighth Air Force. He returned to civilian life a first lieutenant, decorated with the Air Medal and Purple Heart.

After serving in the United States Army Air Forces from 1943 to 1946, he married and completed a law degree in 1949. During the 1965–1966 school year, he was a visiting student at the Woodrow Wilson School of Public and International Affairs at Princeton University.

== Career ==
Davis began his career as a criminal investigator with the United States Department of the Treasury, serving from 1949 to 1955 in McAlester, Oklahoma. Davis also served as a part-time law instructor and assistant director at United States Treasury Police training school in Washington, D.C., from 1953 to 1961.

Davis later became an administrator at the Alcohol and Tobacco Tax and Trade Bureau, and served as the first director of the Bureau of Alcohol Tobacco and Firearms when it became independent from the Internal Revenue Service.

Davis retired from federal service in 1978, and began working as an executive of trade associations in the alcoholic beverage industry.

He served as president of the National Association of Beverage Importers and chief executive of New Europe Wines. In 1984, Davis testified before the United States House Committee on Ways and Means about the market expansion for American-produced wines. Davis later served as the executive director of the President's Forum of the Beverage Alcohol Industry.

Davis was a strong supporter of the Brady Campaign against gun violence. He was a founding member of the National Law Enforcement Museum in Washington.

== Death ==
He died of complications from a colon infection, January 7, 2008, in Bethesda, Maryland.

Government offices
Preceded by Thomas F. Casey	ATF chief 1970–1978	Succeeded by G.R. Dickerson
