= Bradley A. Buckles =

Fifth Director of the Bureau of Alcohol, Tobacco and Firearms

5th Director of the Bureau of Alcohol, Tobacco, Firearms and Explosives
- In office December 20, 1999 - January 2, 2004 (Acting: January 24, 2003 – January 2, 2004)
- Appointed by: Lawrence Summers; John Ashcroft (to be acting Director)
- Preceded by: John Magaw
- Succeeded by: Edgar A. Domenech (acting); Carl Joseph Truscott

Bradley A. Buckles was sworn in as the fifth Director of the Bureau of Alcohol, Tobacco and Firearms (ATF) on December 20, 1999, by Secretary of the Treasury Lawrence Summers. He previously served as deputy director under ATF Director John Magaw from 1996 to 1999. He began his service with ATF in 1974 when he joined the ATF Office of Chief Counsel. He was named Chief Counsel of ATF in 1995.

The Homeland Security Act of 2002 reorganized federal law enforcement and domestic security efforts and established the Department of Homeland Security. This legislation moved components of the Departments of Treasury, Justice, Transportation and other agencies to a new Department of Homeland Security. This law also transferred ATF law enforcement and firearms and explosives regulatory functions to the Justice Department. ATF's tax collection and trade practice regulation of the beverage alcohol industries were retained in the Treasury Department. Buckles worked with Treasury officials and ATF regulatory and tax experts on the setup of the new Alcohol and Tobacco Tax and Trade Bureau (TTB) in the Treasury Department and was responsible for the transition of the remainder of the agency to the Department of Justice. He was named acting director of the new Bureau of Alcohol, Tobacco, Firearms and Explosives (ATF) by Attorney General John Ashcroft in January 2003. He served in this capacity until retiring from federal service in January 2004.

Buckles is a graduate of the University of Wyoming and Washburn University School of Law.

Government offices
Preceded by John Magaw	5th Director of the Bureau of Alcohol, Tobacco, Firearms and Explosives; 1999–2004	Succeeded by Carl Truscott
