= Stephen Higgins =

American law enforcement official (born 1938)

Stephen E. Higgins

3rd Director of the Bureau of Alcohol, Tobacco, and Firearms
- In office March 1982 – September 30, 1993; Acting to March 28, 1983
- Appointed by: Donald T. Regan
- President: Ronald Reagan
- Preceded by: G.R. Dickerson
- Succeeded by: John William Magaw

Personal details
- Born: 1938 (age 87–88)

Stephen E. Higgins (born 1938) is an American law enforcement official who served as the third Director of the Bureau of Alcohol, Tobacco and Firearms from 1983 to 1993, subsequently known as the Bureau of Alcohol, Tobacco, Firearms and Explosives (ATF). He is primarily known for his involvement in the Waco siege.

== Life and career ==
Higgins joined the IRS Alcohol and Tobacco Tax Division (ATTD), predecessor of ATF, in 1961 in Omaha, Nebraska. After serving as acting director, Higgins was appointed by Treasury Secretary Donald T. Regan in 1983. Higgins retired following a report faulting ATF for their handling of the Waco siege.
