= Robert E. Kramek =

US Coast Guard admiral (1939–2016)

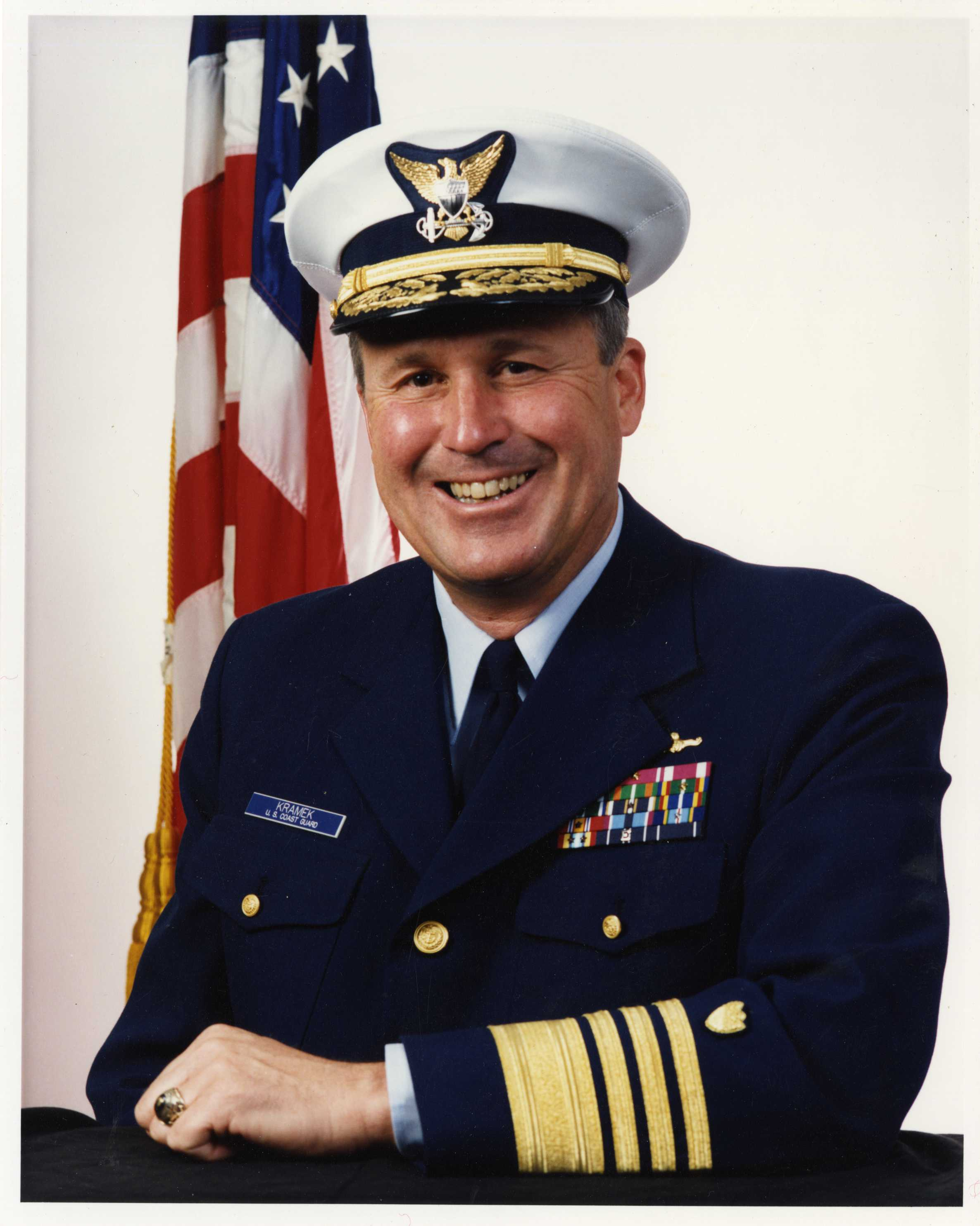
- Born: December 15, 1939; New York, New York, U.S.
- Died: October 20, 2016 (aged 76); Houston, Texas, U.S.
- Alma mater: University of Michigan
- Military career
- Branch: United States Coast Guard
- Service years: 1957–1998
- Rank: Admiral
- Commands: Commandant of the Coast Guard; USCGC Midgett (WHEC-726)
- Awards: Coast Guard Distinguished Service Medal; Legion of Merit; Defense Meritorious Service Medal; Joint Service Commendation Medal; Coast Guard Commendation Medal

Robert Edward Kramek (December 15, 1939 – October 20, 2016) was an admiral of the United States Coast Guard who served as the 20th commandant from 1994 to 1998. During his tenure as commandant, he successfully led the service through difficult budget battles each year and directed the "streamlining" plan that was mandated by the National Performance Review and "Mandate for Change".

== Education ==
Kramek graduated from high school in the Bayside neighborhood of Queens in New York City. He was also an Eagle Scout. He graduated with honors from the United States Coast Guard Academy in New London, Connecticut, and also attended graduate schools at the University of Michigan, Johns Hopkins University, and the University of Alaska. Furthermore, he graduated with high distinction from the Naval War College in Newport, Rhode Island. in 1998, he was honored with the Naval War College Distinguished Graduate Leadership Award.

== Coast Guard career ==
Upon graduation from the Coast Guard Academy in 1961, Kramek was commissioned as an Ensign. He quickly advanced through the ranks, accepting assignments such as commander of the High-Endurance Cutter USCGC Midgett, Commander of the Coast Guard base at Governors Island, Commander of the 7th and 13th Coast Guard Districts, Regional Drug Interdiction Coordinator, Haitian Migration Task Force Coordinator, and Coast Guard Chief of Staff before becoming Commandant.

== American Bureau of Shipping career ==
Following his retirement from the Coast Guard, Kramek joined the Houston, Texas-based American Bureau of Shipping, serving as President of the Americas Division from 1998 to 2004, and as president and Chief Operating Officer from 2004 to 2006.

== Death ==
While aboard a commercial airliner, Kramek suffered a stroke, then a fatal cardiac arrest in a matter of minutes on October 20, 2016, and was buried at Arlington National Cemetery.

Military offices
Preceded by J. William Kime	Commandant of the Coast Guard; 1994—1999	Succeeded by James Loy
