= America's Waterway Watch =

United States Coast Guard program

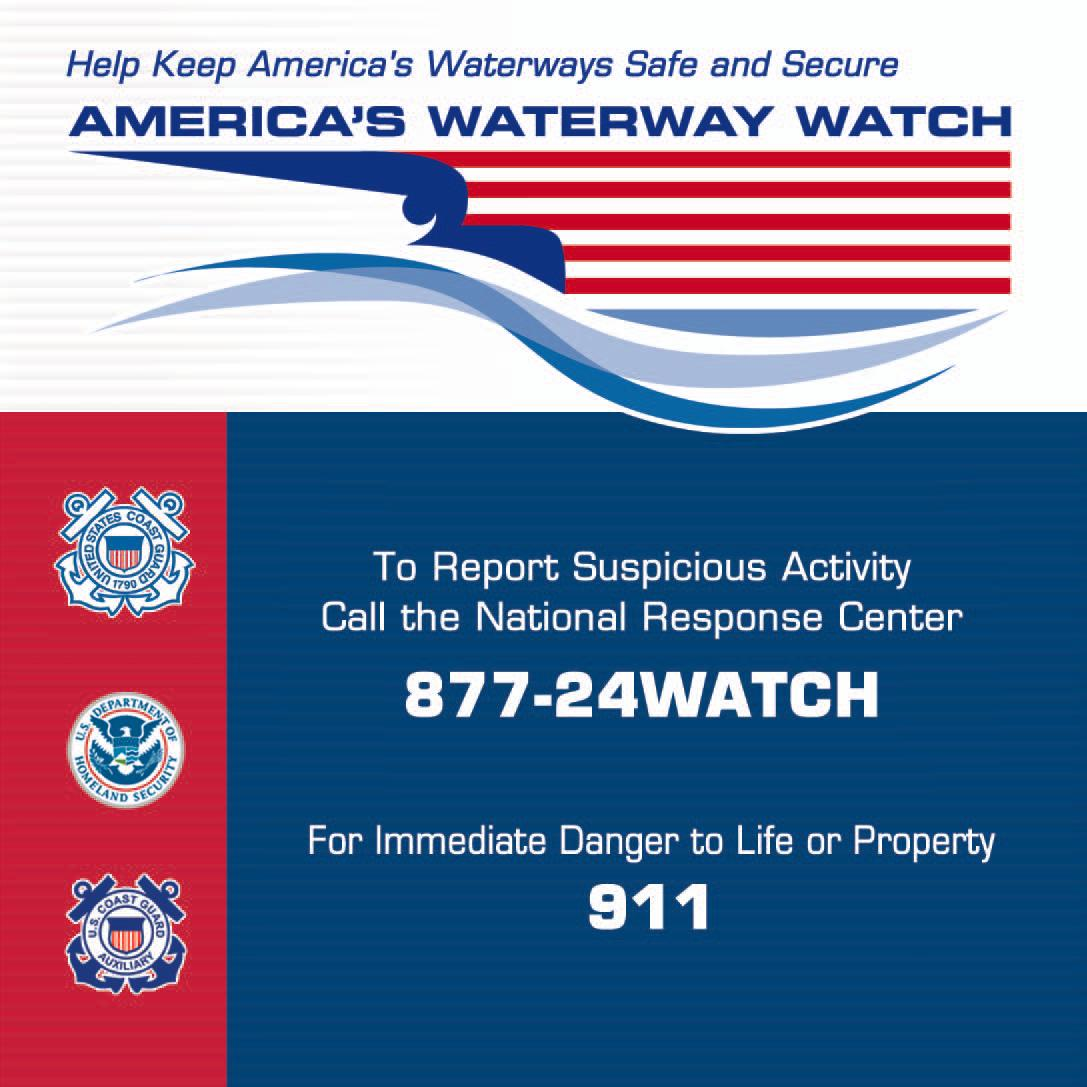
Decal promoting America's Waterway Watch

America's Waterway Watch (AWW) is a program of the United States Coast Guard and its Reserve and Auxiliary components to encourage members of the public to be on the alert for suspicious behavior by boaters. As part of an effort to tighten security after the September 11 attacks of 2001, people involved in the maritime industry and recreational boating were encouraged by the Coast Guard to report suspicious activity to the National Response Center. In 2005, Coast Guard Commandant Thomas H. Collins issued Commandant Instruction 16618.8, formalizing the program as America's Waterway Watch.

Research conducted between 2010 and 2013 that compared marinas that had adopted AWW with marinas that did not found a decreased crime rate in adopting marinas.
