= Joe Allbaugh =

American political figure (born 1952)

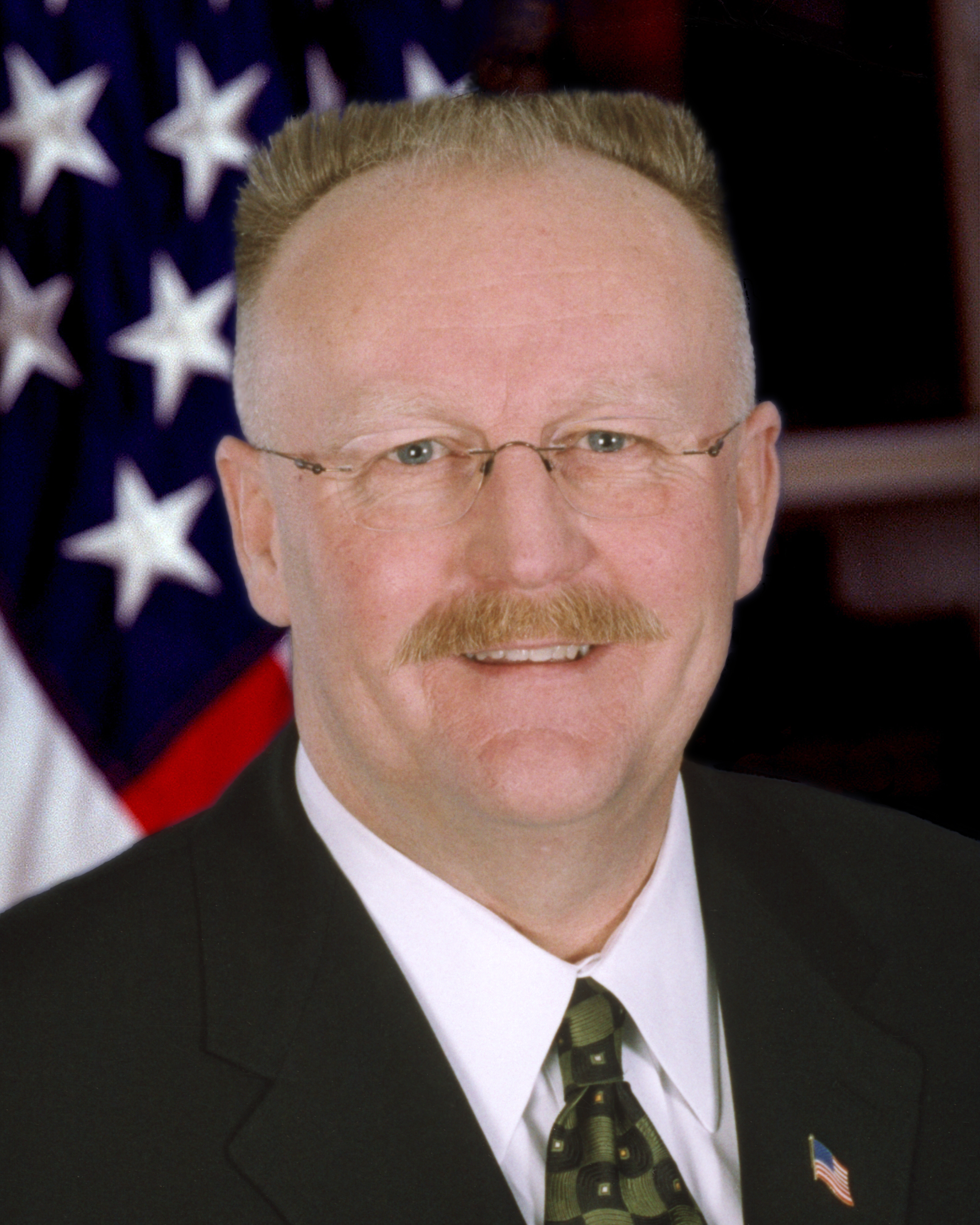
- Official portrait, 2001

Administrator of the Federal Emergency Management Agency
- In office February 15, 2001 – March 15, 2003
- President: George W. Bush
- Preceded by: John Magaw (acting)
- Succeeded by: Michael D. Brown

Personal details
- Born: July 27, 1952 (age 74) Blackwell, Oklahoma, U.S.
- Party: Republican
- Education: Oklahoma State University, Stillwater (BA)

Joe M. Allbaugh (born February 27, 1952) is an American political figure in the Republican Party. After spending most of his career in Oklahoma and Texas, Allbaugh came to national prominence working for Texas governor George W. Bush and helping manage his 2000 presidential election campaign. Allbaugh then became Bush's Director of the Federal Emergency Management Agency (FEMA) beginning in February 2001. He served until FEMA's transfer into the newly created Department of Homeland Security, after which he resigned in March 2003. He was appointed as the interim Director of the Oklahoma Department of Corrections by the state Board of Corrections, effective January 11, 2016. On July 6, 2016, the Oklahoma Board of Corrections voted unanimously to make his appointment permanent and set his salary at $185,000. Allbaugh has pointed out his department "is not a listing ship, it is a sinking ship."

== Early political involvement ==
Allbaugh began working on political campaigns at the age of 12 as a volunteer for Barry Goldwater's presidential campaign. He went on to earn a degree in political science from Oklahoma State University where he became a member of Beta Theta Pi (ΒΘΠ) Fraternity. His first paid political job was working for Oklahoma Senator Henry Bellmon in 1974. After working on the field staff of the Reagan-Bush campaign in 1984, Allbaugh returned to Oklahoma to help Bellmon win a race for governor in 1986. He later served as a deputy secretary of transportation under Bellmon's successor, David Walters.

== The George W. Bush campaigns ==
In 1994, Allbaugh was brought to Texas by George W. Bush to manage his campaign for governor. After Bush's victory, Allbaugh worked as gubernatorial chief of staff, serving until 1999 when he shifted posts to become campaign manager in Bush's run for the presidency. In this capacity Allbaugh was a key member of a tight circle of aides, together with Karl Rove and Karen Hughes, that the media dubbed the "Iron Triangle". Allbaugh called the trio "the brain, the brawn and the bite", with himself as the brawn at 6 feet 4 inches and 275 pounds.

After Bush secured the Republican nomination, he chose Dick Cheney to lead the process of screening and selecting a running mate. Allbaugh ended up with the responsibility of vetting Cheney himself when Bush focused directly on Cheney as his choice for vice president, rather than as the man to simply help with the choice. The screening process was subsequently called into question when Cheney's Halliburton stock options, along with his sparse voting record in state and local elections, came to light. A Cheney spokeswoman defended Allbaugh's vetting process, saying it "was as thorough, if not more thorough than what other candidates went through." It remained unclear whether Cheney had filled out a questionnaire he had given the other potential running mates, which dealt with these issues among other topics.

When the election results turned into a dispute over Florida ballot counts, Allbaugh went to Florida to run the post-election operation there while other advisers remained behind in Texas. After the legal maneuverings played out with Bush prevailing, he named Allbaugh as his nominee to head the Federal Emergency Management Agency on January 4, 2001.

== Allbaugh at FEMA ==
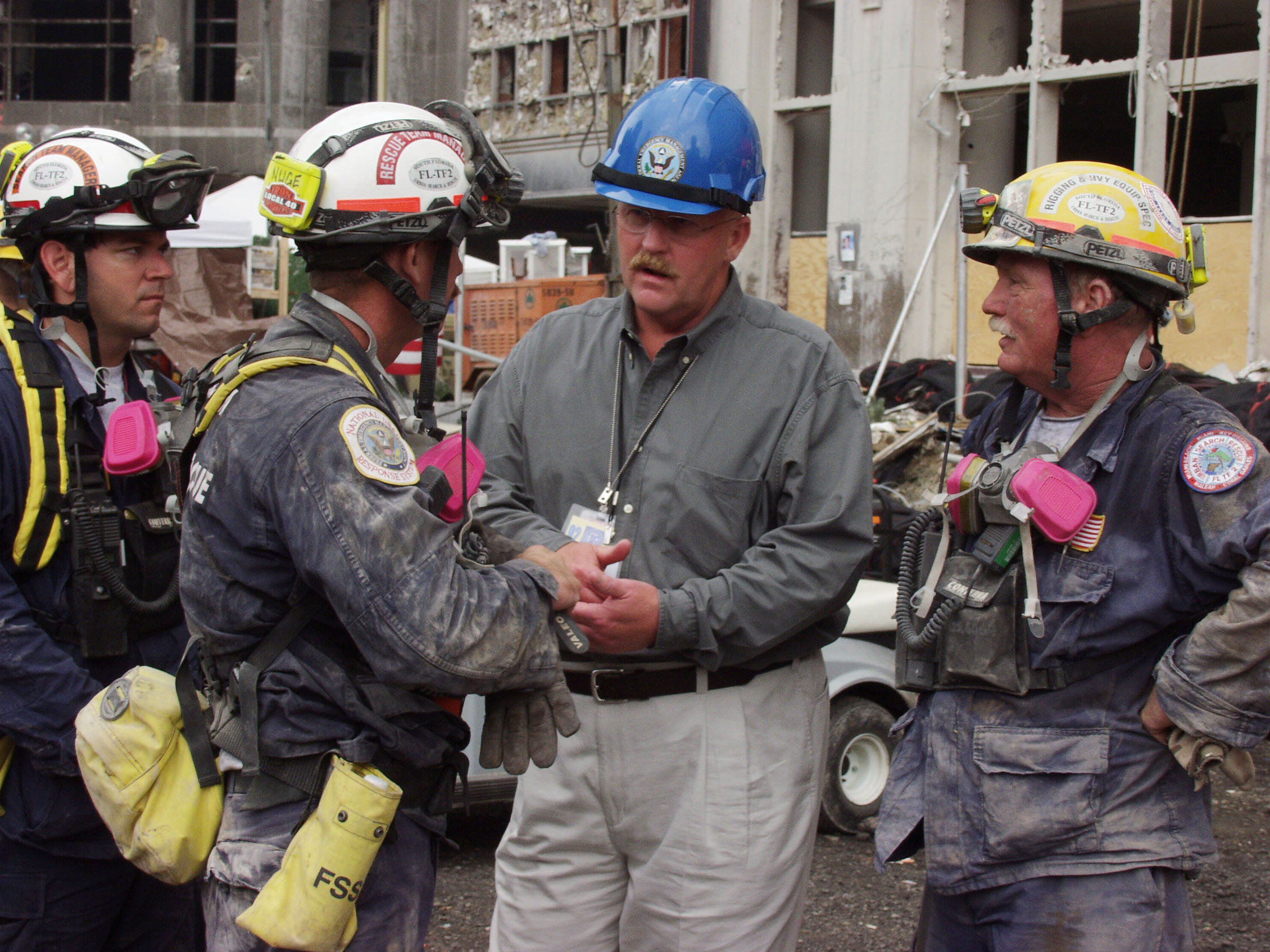
FEMA Director Joe Allbaugh meets with Florida US&R Task Force 2 at the World Trade Center on September 24, 2001.

Allbaugh was confirmed as Director of FEMA in February 2001 by the Senate in a unanimous vote. Unlike his predecessor, he was not raised to cabinet rank. Allbaugh gained some attention that April for remarks questioning whether taxpayers should have to cover the cost of rebuilding properties that suffer repeated flood damage, just as the Mississippi River was flooding. This turned into a public disagreement with the mayor of Davenport, Iowa, one of the affected cities. It brought up policy issues that would arise again under Michael D. Brown, Allbaugh's former deputy and FEMA successor, after Hurricane Katrina. The Bush administration also proposed cuts to FEMA's budget and the National Flood Insurance Program. After Tropical Storm Allison hit Texas in June, however, Allbaugh said the budget cuts would affect the agency's ability to respond to future disasters.

In May 2001, Bush announced that FEMA would expand its responsibility to include government response to terrorist attacks. Allbaugh explained that this mission, dubbed "homeland defense", would focus on dealing with the effects of such attacks, but not extend to gathering intelligence to prevent them. This left the agency as one of the most visible responders in the aftermath of the September 11, 2001 attacks. At the time of the attacks, Allbaugh was attending a conference in Big Sky, Montana, on the subject of emergency response. FEMA came under severe criticism for its delays in processing applications for relief and inappropriate denials of applications for assistance for those who suffered resulting from the attacks on the Twin Towers.

The September 11 attacks eventually led to a cabinet reorganization placing FEMA in the newly created Department of Homeland Security and Allbaugh elected to leave the agency. He made his resignation effective March 1, 2003, the date the reorganization was to take effect. Brown was an Oklahoma native and Allbaugh's old friend from Republican state politics, first hired by Allbaugh as FEMA's general counsel, despite having padded his legal and emergency services credentials.

== Post-FEMA career ==
After leaving the government, Allbaugh capitalized on his ties with the Bush administration by going into private business ventures connected with Bush's policy objectives. He and Republican strategist Ed Rogers founded New Bridge Strategies to help clients "evaluate and take advantage of business opportunities in the Middle East following the conclusion of the US-led war in Iraq". Allbaugh also co-chaired Diligence-Iraq, founded by former CIA and FBI chief William Webster and 40 percent owned by a wealthy Kuwaiti politician, which partnered with New Bridge to advise and provide security for companies doing business there.

Allbaugh also started his own firm, which he merged in 2004 with that of his wife Diane, who had worked as a lobbyist at the Republican firm of Barbour Griffith & Rogers during his government service. The Allbaugh Company is commonly described as a lobbying and consulting firm, although Joe Allbaugh himself says he only consults with clients on presenting their services to government agencies, and does not lobby the government directly for contracts. The Wall Street Journal compared his work to that of his predecessor at FEMA, James Lee Witt, who also provided consulting and lobbying services after leaving government service. Major Allbaugh Company clients include The Shaw Group and Halliburton subsidiary KBR.

Though no longer affiliated with FEMA, Allbaugh traveled to the Gulf Coast after Hurricane Katrina to help coordinate private-sector support, according to his spokeswoman. His clients were among the first to win federal contracts to help with hurricane recovery: Shaw won a bid potentially worth $100 million to refurbish buildings and provide emergency housing, and KBR received $29.8 million from the Pentagon to rebuild Navy bases in Louisiana and Mississippi.

On July 12, 2006, Emergent Biosolutions, maker of an anthrax vaccine under its former name BioPort, announced that Allbaugh joined the board of directors. During the years before Allbaugh's appointment, BioPort had a troubled relationship with the US Food and Drug Administration. In September 2006, Allbaugh was elected president of Ecosphere Systems, Inc. He also sits on the board of directors of the National Rifle Association of America.

=== Senior Advisor to Rudy Giuliani ===
The Rudy Giuliani Presidential Committee announced on October 30, 2007, that Joe Allbaugh would serve as Senior Advisor to the Rudy Giuliani presidential campaign. Allbaugh was to advise the campaign on general strategy and homeland security. Allbaugh stated that "Rudy Giuliani is the only candidate who will keep America on offense in the Terrorists’ War on Us". According to Giuliani, he and Albaugh "worked closely together in the aftermath of 9/11 to ensure that everything possible was being done to help victims and their families. He has significant experience in emergency management and I will look to him for sound advice and expertise."

=== 2012 presidential election ===
Allbaugh served as campaign manager for Texas Governor Rick Perry in the 2012 presidential election.

=== Director, Oklahoma Department of Corrections ===
Oklahoma Department of Corrections (DOC) Director Joseph Allbaugh requested a $23 million supplemental appropriation to get through until June 30. 2016. The supplemental appropriation was needed to pay for-profit prison corporations CoreCivic and GEO Group to hold overflow inmates, salaries for uniformed staff, which are extremely low, and prisoner medical bills. The DOC must adhere to mandated standards regarding inmate services to remain in constitutional compliance. With the threat it would lock out 2,600 Oklahoma prison inmates, the owner of Oklahoma's largest private prison successfully lobbied the legislature for a raise this year, the Frontier reports. The GEO Group's sprawling Lawton Correctional Facility holds about 10 percent of Oklahoma's prison population. With Oklahoma's prisons operating at 114 percent capacity, the private corrections company has the bargaining power to ask the state for more money. In June, the Oklahoma Department of Corrections signed a five-year deal with The GEO Group to house inmates in Lawton that contained a rate increase worth an estimated $2.8 million. Florida's GEO Group hasn't consistently met the terms of its Oklahoma contract. The for-profit prison operator frequently failed its contractual contract violations at its Lawton, Oklahoma prison, one that houses some of Oklahoma's most dangerous prisoners. The Oklahoma DOC notified GEO regarding multiple violations at the Lawton Correctional Facility in 2017 and 2018, including the delayed releases of several offenders, the improper use of restraints, missing or improperly recorded prisoner counts, and failure to adhere to medication and nursing protocols. In 2017, the DOC fined GEO Group $380,000 for delaying the release of a Lawton prisoner by 304 late subsequent to the modification of his sentence. The GEO Group has a history of problems with such improper releases at Lawton, said Allbaugh: "Private prisons do not run their facilities to our standards, but they are supposed to adhere to our operational protocols." "The only way you can get their attention is financial sanctions." On April 17, 2019, Allbaugh reported the DOC is "getting closer every day" to obtaining the equipment necessary to resume the death penalty, although no firm date has been set for executions to resume. The DOC said in 2018 it will replace lethal injection with "nitrogen hypoxia." a procedure which supposedly will painlessly smother an unconscious person. Without such a machine, the DOC has been unable to resume executions that had been horribly botched in recent years. Richard Glossip, whose guilt has been widely questioned, has had his execution postponed numerous times due to faulty protocols.

== Personal life ==
Allbaugh, in an interview with Texas Monthly editor Evan Smith of Texas Monthly Talks, said, "Wikipedia is 99 percent wrong. I mean, my bio on Wikipedia is trash."

Allbaugh's nephew Jeremy Allbaugh served in the United States Marine Corps, was killed on July 5, 2007, while in Iraq. His nephew Jason Allbaugh is currently serving as a commissioned officer in the United States Army.

== See also ==
- Lobbying in the United States

Political offices
| Preceded by John Magaw; Acting | Administrator of the Federal Emergency Management Agency; 2001–2003 | Succeeded by Michael D. Brown |
