= Bureau of Alcohol, Tobacco, Firearms and Explosives =

U.S. law enforcement agency

- ATF Seal

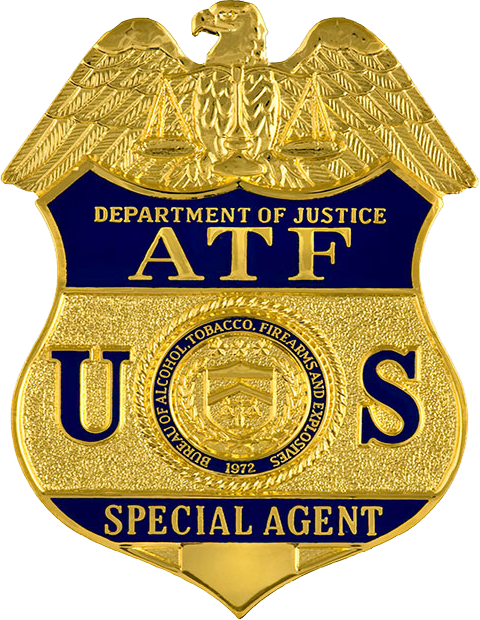
- ATF agent badge

- ATF Flag
- Common name: Alcohol, Tobacco and Firearms
- Abbreviation: ATF

Agency overview
- Formed: July 1, 1972; 54 years ago
- Preceding agency: IRS Alcohol, Tobacco, and Firearms Division
- Employees: 4,696 positions (FY 2026)
- Annual budget: US$1.585 billion (FY 2026 enacted)

Jurisdictional structure
- Federal agency: United States
- Operations jurisdiction: United States
- General nature: Federal law enforcement

Operational structure
- Headquarters: Ariel Rios Federal Building, Washington, D.C.
- Agency executive: Robert Cekada, Director
- Parent agency: Department of the Treasury (1972–2003); Department of Justice (2003–present)

Website
- atf.gov

The Bureau of Alcohol, Tobacco, Firearms and Explosives (ATF; unofficially abbreviated as BATFE) is a federal law enforcement agency under the United States Department of Justice. Its responsibilities include the investigation and prevention of federal offenses involving the unlawful use, manufacture, and possession of firearms and explosives; acts of arson and bombings; and illegal trafficking and tax evasion of alcohol and tobacco products.

ATF also regulates via licensing the sale, possession, and transportation of firearms, ammunition, and explosives in interstate commerce. Many of ATF's activities are carried out in conjunction with task forces made up of state and local law enforcement officers, such as Project Safe Neighborhoods.

ATF operates a unique fire research laboratory in Beltsville, Maryland, where full-scale mock-ups of criminal arson can be reconstructed. For fiscal year 2026, ATF was funded at $1.585 billion with 4,696 positions, including 2,413 special agents. ATF has received criticism over its handling of the investigation leading up to the Ruby Ridge standoff, the Waco siege, Operation Fast and Furious, and other controversies.

== History ==
The seal of ATF when it was a part of the U.S. Department of the Treasury

ATF was formerly part of the United States Department of the Treasury. It traces its lineage to the federal tax on imported spirits enacted July 31, 1789; one predecessor, a Treasury revenue laboratory, was established in 1886. The history of ATF can be subsequently traced to the time of the revenuers or "revenoors" and the Bureau of Prohibition, which was formed as a unit of the Bureau of Internal Revenue in 1920. It was made an independent agency within the Treasury Department in 1927, was transferred to the Justice Department in 1930, and became, briefly, a division of the FBI in 1933.

When the Volstead Act, which established Prohibition in the United States, was repealed in December 1933, the Unit was transferred from the Department of Justice back to the Department of the Treasury, where it became the Alcohol Tax Unit (ATU) of the Bureau of Internal Revenue. Special Agent Eliot Ness and several members of The Untouchables, who had worked for the Prohibition Bureau while the Volstead Act was still in force, were transferred to the ATU. In 1941, the ATU was commissioned to enforce the Federal Firearms Act and the National Firearms Act, effective October 18, 1941.

In the early 1950s, the Bureau of Internal Revenue was renamed "Internal Revenue Service" (IRS), and the ATU was given the additional responsibility of enforcing federal tobacco tax laws. At this time, the name of the ATU was changed to the Alcohol and Tobacco Tax Division (ATTD).

In 1968, with the passage of the Gun Control Act, the agency changed its name again, this time to the Alcohol, Tobacco, and Firearms Division of the IRS and first began to be referred to by the initials "ATF". In Title XI of the Organized Crime Control Act of 1970, Congress enacted the Explosives Control Act, 18 U.S.C.A. Chapter 40, which provided for close regulation of the explosives industry and designated certain arsons and bombings as federal crimes. The Secretary of the Treasury was made responsible for administering the regulatory aspects of the new law, and was given jurisdiction over criminal violations relating to the regulatory controls. These responsibilities were delegated to the ATF division of the IRS. The Secretary and the Attorney General were given concurrent jurisdiction over arson and bombing offenses. Pub.L. 91-452, 84 Stat. 922, October 15, 1970.

In 1972, ATF was officially established as an independent bureau within the Treasury Department on July 1, 1972, this transferred the responsibilities of the ATF division of the IRS to the new Bureau of Alcohol, Tobacco, and Firearms. Rex D. Davis oversaw the transition, becoming the bureau's first director, having headed the division since 1970. During his tenure, Davis shepherded the organization into a new era where federal firearms and explosives laws addressing violent crime became the primary mission of the agency. However, taxation and other alcohol issues remained priorities as ATF collected billions of dollars in alcohol and tobacco taxes, and undertook major revisions of the federal wine labeling regulations relating to use of appellations of origin and varietal designations on wine labels.

In the wake of the terrorist attack on the World Trade Center and the Pentagon on September 11, 2001, President George W. Bush signed into law the Homeland Security Act of 2002. In addition to the creation of the Department of Homeland Security, the law shifted ATF from the Department of the Treasury to the Department of Justice. The agency's name was changed to Bureau of Alcohol, Tobacco, Firearms, and Explosives. However, the agency still was referred to as "ATF" for all purposes. Additionally, the task of collection of federal tax revenue derived from the production of tobacco and alcohol products and the regulatory function related to protecting the public in issues related to the production of alcohol, previously handled by the Bureau of Internal Revenue as well as by ATF, was transferred to the newly established Alcohol and Tobacco Tax and Trade Bureau (TTB), which remained within the Treasury Department. These changes took effect January 24, 2003.

=== Activities ===
==== 1972–2000 ====
Complaints regarding the techniques used by ATF in their effort to generate firearm cases led to hearings before Congressional committees in the late 1970s and 1980s. At these hearings, evidence was received from citizens who had been charged by ATF, from experts who had studied ATF, and from officials of the bureau itself. A Senate subcommittee report stated, "Based upon these hearings it is apparent that ATF enforcement tactics made possible by current federal firearms laws are constitutionally, legally, and practically reprehensible." The Subcommittee received evidence that ATF primarily devoted its firearms enforcement efforts to the apprehension, upon technical malum prohibitum charges, of individuals who lack all criminal intent and knowledge. Evidence received demonstrated that ATF agents tended to concentrate upon collector's items rather than "criminal street guns". In hearings before ATF's Appropriations Subcommittee, testimony was submitted estimating that 75 percent of ATF gun prosecutions were aimed at ordinary citizens with no criminal intent. The Firearm Owners Protection Act of 1986 addressed some of the abuses noted in the 1982 Senate Judiciary Subcommittee report.

=== Ruby Ridge Siege controversy ===
The Ruby Ridge standoff began in June 1990. Randy Weaver sold two unregistered short barrel shotguns to Kenneth Fadeley, an ATF informant. This transaction was recorded and presented to the court. Weaver's court date was changed to the day after his original day but Weaver was not notified, and did not appear. Weaver refused to face his accusers and became a fugitive from justice. He maintained the barrels were a legal length, but after Fadeley took possession, the shotguns were later found to be shorter than allowed by federal law, requiring registration as a short-barreled shotgun and payment of a $200 tax. ATF brought firearms charges against Weaver, but offered to drop the charges if he would become an informant. After Weaver refused to cooperate, ATF passed on false information about Weaver to other agencies that became part of a misleading file that profiled Weaver as having explosive booby traps, tunnels, and bunkers at his home; growing marijuana; having felony convictions; and being a bank robber.

At his later trial, the gun charges were determined to be entrapment and Weaver was acquitted. However, Weaver missed a February 20, 1991, court date because U.S. Probation Officer Richins mistakenly told Weaver that the trial date was March 20, and the US Marshals Service (USMS) was charged with bringing Weaver in. Weaver remained with his family in their mountain top cabin. On August 21, 1992, a USMS surveillance team encountered Weaver, a friend and family members on a trail near the cabin, resulting in a shootout that killed US Marshal Bill Degan, Weaver's son Samuel, and Weaver's pet dog. FBI Hostage Rescue Team (HRT) members surrounded the cabin. The next day, HRT sniper Lon Horiuchi fired at Weaver, missing and killing Weaver's wife. A subsequent Department of Justice review and a Congressional hearing raised several questions about the actions of ATF, USMS, USAO, and FBI HRT and the mishandling of intelligence at the USMS and FBI headquarters. The Ruby Ridge incident has become a lightning rod for legal activists within the gun rights community.

=== Rodney King riots ===
On May 1, 1992, 50 ATF agents were summoned to provide extra support for local police departments in Los Angeles County in response to the ongoing Rodney King riots. The next day, ATF activated its Special Response Team tactical unit to escort firefighters in high-risk areas, pair up with local police in protecting certain establishments, and execute search warrants for looted firearms. During the riots, a total of 4,690 firearms were looted and stolen; over the next 10 days, ATF recovered fewer than 200 firearms.

=== Waco Siege controversy ===
ATF was involved in the Waco Siege against the Branch Davidian religious sect near Waco, Texas, on February 28, 1993. ATF agents, accompanied by the press, conducted a raid to execute a federal search warrant on the sect's compound, known as Mt. Carmel. The Branch Davidians were alerted to the upcoming warrant execution, but ATF raid leaders pressed on, despite knowing the advantage of surprise was lost. (ATF Director Steve Higgins had promised Treasury Under Secretary for Enforcement Ron Noble that the Waco raid would be canceled if the ATF undercover agent Robert Rodriguez reported that the element of surprise had been lost.) The resulting exchange of gunfire killed six Davidians and four ATF agents. FBI HRT later took over the scene and a 51-day stand-off ensued, ending on April 19, 1993, after the complex caught fire.

The follow-up investigation revealed the bodies of seventy-six people including twenty children inside the compound. A grand jury found that the deaths were suicides or otherwise caused by people inside the building. Shortly after the raid, the bureau's director, Stephen E. Higgins, retired early from his position. In December 1994, two ATF supervisory agents, Phillip J. Chojnacki and Charles D. Sarabyn, who were suspended for their roles in leading the Waco raid were reinstated, with full back pay and benefits (with a demotion) despite a Treasury Department report of gross negligence. The incident was removed from their personnel files.

=== Domestic terrorism towards ATF ===
Timothy McVeigh cited Ruby Ridge and Waco Siege as his motivation for the Oklahoma City Bombing, which took place on April 19, 1995, exactly two years after the end of the Waco Siege. McVeigh's criterion for attack sites was that the target should house at least two of three federal law enforcement agencies: the Bureau of Alcohol, Tobacco, and Firearms (ATF), the Federal Bureau of Investigation (FBI), and the Drug Enforcement Administration (DEA). He regarded the presence of additional law enforcement agencies, such as the Secret Service or the U.S. Marshals Service, as a bonus. Until the September 11, 2001, attacks, the Oklahoma City bombing was the deadliest terrorist attack in the history of the United States, and remains the deadliest incident of domestic terrorism in the country's history. McVeigh was executed for this mass murder by lethal injection on June 11, 2001, at the Federal Correctional Complex in Terre Haute, Indiana.

==== 2000–present ====
Initial flag of ATF as part of the U.S. Department of Justice; the Latin scroll was later replaced with one bearing the agency's name.

ATF was criticized for poor planning leading up to a shootout at Stevenson Ranch, California, in 2001, which resulted in the immediate deaths of a deputy sheriff as well as the suspect, and the later suicide of ATF agent Jeff Ryan.

Following the attacks on September 11, 2001, ATF expanded regulations covering fuels used in amateur rocketry, including ammonium perchlorate composite propellant (APCP). Two rocketry clubs, the National Association of Rocketry (NAR) and the Tripoli Rocketry Association (TRA), argued that APCP is not explosive and that the ATF's regulations were unreasonable. The NAR and TRA won their lawsuit against ATF in 2009, lifting the government restrictions. The associations maintain their own restrictions, and rocketry is also regulated by the Federal Aviation Administration (FAA).

Between May 2004 and August 2005, ATF agents, in conjunction with Virginia state, county, and city police, conducted an operation at eight gun shows in the Richmond area to reduce straw purchases for criminals. In a February 2006 House subcommittee hearing, the show's owner said: "People were approached and discouraged from purchasing guns. Before attempting to purchase, they were interrogated and accused of being in the business without a license, detained in police vehicles, and gun buyer's homes were visited by police, and much more." A gun salesman testified that he was singled out for harassment by two ATF agents. The owner of a gun shop testified that he thought agents questioned female customers too often. He said that times had changed and more women were shopping for guns, adding: "It seems, however, to be the prevailing opinion for law enforcement at the gun show that any woman who brings a male friend for advice or support must be making a straw purchase." A private investigator said the National Rifle Association (NRA) contracted her to go to Richmond to investigate dozens of complaints by NRA members of "massive law enforcement presence, residence checks, and minority buyers being followed, pulled over and their legally purchased guns seized." The purchasers were compelled by an ATF letter to appear at ATF offices to explain and justify their purchases. ATF stated this was a pilot program that ATF was planning to apply throughout the country. In Pittsburgh, Pennsylvania, ATF agents visited a gun show's customers' homes a week after the show, demanding to see the buyers' guns or sale paperwork and arresting those who could not—or would not—comply.

A September 2008 report by the Justice Department's Office of the Inspector General determined that 76 firearms and 418 laptop computers were lost, stolen, or missing from ATF, after a 59-month audit period between 2002 and 2007.

In May 2008, William Newell, Special Agent in charge of the Phoenix ATF Office, said: "When 90 percent-plus of the firearms recovered from these violent drug cartels are from a U.S. source, we have a responsibility to do everything we can to stem the illegal flow of these firearms to these thugs." According to the Justice Department's Office of the Inspector General, "ATF told the OIG that the 90-percent figure ... could be misleading because it applied only to the small portion of Mexican crime guns that are traced." Under operations "Fast and Furious", "Too Hot to Handle", and "Wide Receiver", indictments show that the Phoenix ATF Office, over protests from the gun dealers and some ATF agents involved and without notifying Mexican authorities, facilitated the sale of over 2,500 firearms (AK-47 rifles, FN 5.7mm pistols, and .50 caliber rifles) to traffickers destined for Mexico. Many of these same guns are being recovered from crime scenes in Arizona and throughout Mexico, which is artificially inflating ATF's eTrace statistics of U.S. origin guns seized in Mexico. One gun is alleged to be the weapon used by a Mexican national to murder Customs and Border Protection Agent Brian Terry on December 14, 2010. ATF and DOJ denied all allegations. After appearing at a Congressional Hearing, three supervisors of Fast and Furious (William G. McMahon, Newell, and David Voth) were reported as being transferred and promoted by ATF. ATF denied the transfers were promotions.

In June 2011, Vince Cefalu, an ATF special agent for 24 years who in December 2010 exposed ATF's Project Gunrunner scandal, was notified of his termination. Two days before the termination, Rep. Darrell Issa (R-CA), chairman of the House Committee on Oversight and Government Reform, sent a letter to ATF warning officials not to retaliate against whistleblowers. Cefalu's dismissal followed allegations that ATF retaliates against whistleblowers. ATF spokesman Drew Wade denied that the bureau is retaliating but declined to comment about Cefalu's case.

In 2015, a proposal by ATF to prohibit sales of certain 5.56 x 45mm ammunition was dropped following a negative response from the public and the legislature.

In 2022, the DOJ Office of the Inspector General (OIG) conducted an audit which found that "thousands of firearms, firearm parts, and ammunition had been stolen from National Firearms and Ammunition Destruction (NFAD) from 2016 to 2019." The NFAD is the branch of ATF used to dispose of firearms forfeited to ATF. The report also stated that ATF has improved its process to reduce thefts but that it still has not implemented all of the recommendations made by the DOJ.

In 2023, federal Judge Reed O'Connor of the Northern District of Texas vacated the Bureau's rule expanding the definition of a firearm frame or receiver. He ruled the ATF exceeded its statutory authority in regulating so-called "readily convertible" or "80% receiver" kits. In March 2025, the Supreme Court reversed in Bondi v. VanDerStok by a vote of 7 to 2, holding that the rule is not facially inconsistent with the Gun Control Act. On remand, Defense Distributed and the Second Amendment Foundation continued the case as Defense Distributed v. Blanche. In August 2026, the district court held 27 C.F.R. 478.11 and 478.12(c) unconstitutional and void for vagueness and enjoined their enforcement against Defense Distributed, the Foundation and its current and future members for specified products.

=== Director confirmation controversy ===
In 2006, the National Rifle Association (NRA) lobbied U.S. representative F. James Sensenbrenner to add a provision to the Patriot Act reauthorization that requires Senate confirmation of ATF director nominees. (Prior to that, ATF directors were simply appointed by the administration.) After that, the NRA lobbied against and effectively blocked all but one presidential nominee until 2022.

In 2007, President George W. Bush nominated Mike Sullivan for the position, a U.S. attorney from Boston with a good reputation, but Republican senators Larry Craig and Michael D. Crapo, both from Idaho, blocked his confirmation after complaints from an Idaho firearms dealer. In 2010, President Barack Obama nominated Andrew L. Traver, head of ATF's Denver Field Division, to fill the top spot, but the Senate never held his confirmation hearings. The NRA strongly opposed Traver's nomination.

Subsequent failed nominations included Fraternal Order of Police president Chuck Canterbury (nominated by Donald Trump) and former ATF agent David Chipman (nominated by Joe Biden).

B. Todd Jones was nominated by President Barack Obama and confirmed by the Senate as permanent ATF director on July 31, 2013, serving until March 31, 2015. Jones was the only successful Senate-approved appointment until the Senate confirmed Steve Dettelbach in July 2022. On April 29, 2026, the Senate confirmed Robert Cekada, a career ATF agent nominated by President Donald Trump, by a vote of 59 to 39, making him the third Senate-confirmed director. On the day Cekada was confirmed, the Justice Department announced nearly three dozen proposed and final rules revising ATF firearms regulations. Dettelbach's confirmation required a procedural maneuver to advance his nomination out of Senate Judiciary committee. It passed the evenly-divided Senate due to two Republicans voting with the Democrats to confirm.

=== Violent crime ===
Since 2001, ATF agents have recommended over 10,000 felons every year for federal prosecution for firearms possession through the Project Safe Neighborhoods framework. In PSN's first year, 2001–2002, over 7,700 of these cases resulted in convictions with an average sentence of over five years per defendant. This number had risen to over 12,000 prosecutions in FY 2007. The annual FBI Uniform Crime Report (UCR) demonstrated that from 2001 to 2010, the reduction of violent crime offenses in United States districts with dedicated Project Safe Neighborhood Agents and United States Attorneys far outperformed the national average. An outgrowth of the Project Safe Neighborhoods framework was the creation of Violent Crime Impact Teams which worked proactively to identify, disrupt, arrest and prosecute the most violent criminals through innovative technology, analytical investigative resources and an integrated federal, state and local law enforcement strategy.

Generally, about 90% of the cases referred by ATF for prosecution each year are for firearms, violent crime, and narcotics offenses. Through the first half of 2011, ATF (with fewer than 2,000 active Special Agents) had recommended 5,203 cases for prosecution.

== Personnel ==
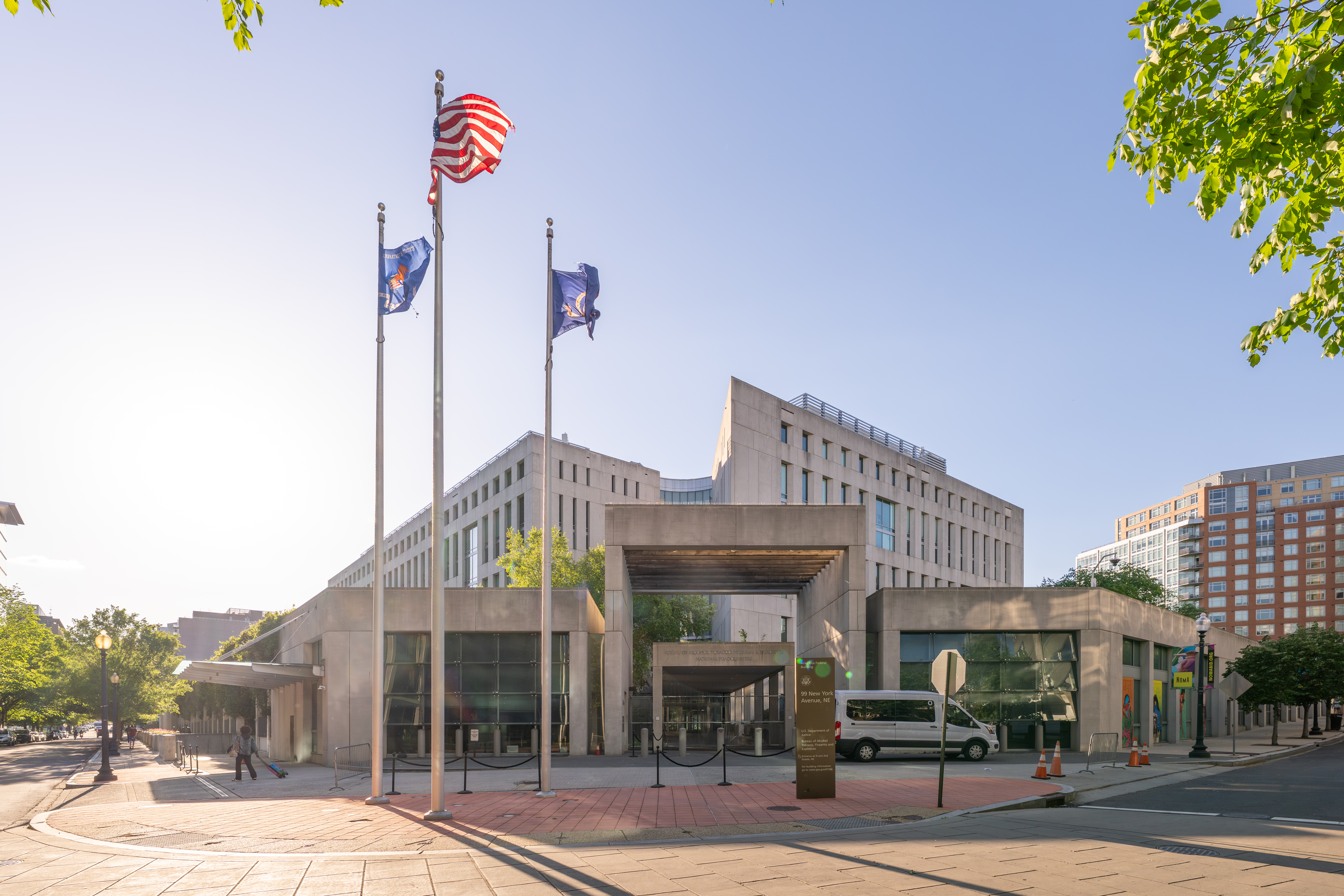
Headquarters at Ariel Rios Federal Building

ATF, as a bureau, consists of several different groups that each have their own respective role, commanded by a director. Special agents are empowered to conduct criminal investigations, defend the United States against international and domestic terrorism, and work with state and local police officers to reduce violent crime on a national level. ATF Special Agents may carry firearms, serve warrants and subpoenas issued under the authority of the United States and make arrests without warrant for any offense against the United States committed in their presence, or for any felony cognizable under the laws of the United States if they have reasonable grounds to believe that the person to be arrested has committed or is committing such felony 18 U.S.C. § 3051. Specifically, ATF Special Agents have lead investigative authority on any federal crime committed with a firearm or explosive, as well as investigative authority over regulatory referrals and cigarette smuggling.

All ATF special agents require a Top Secret (TS) security clearance, and in many instances, need a higher level, TS/SCI/SAP (Top Secret/Sensitive Compartmented Information/Special Access Programs) clearance. In order to get a security clearance, all potential ATF special agents must pass a detailed series of Single Scope Background Investigations (SSBI). ATF special agents consistently rank at the top or near the top of all federal agencies in cases referred for prosecution, arrests made, and average time per defendant on an annual basis. Special agents account for about 2,400 of the agency's roughly 4,700 positions (FY 2026).

Industry Operations Investigators (IOIs) are the backbone of the ATF regulatory mission. Their work is primarily investigative and routinely involves contact with, and interviews of, individuals from all walks of life and all levels of industry and government. Investigations and inspections pertain to the industries and persons regulated by ATF (e.g., firearms and explosives users, dealers, importers, exporters, manufacturers, wholesalers, etc.); and are under the jurisdiction of the Gun Control Act, National Firearms Act, Arms Export Control Act, Organized Crime Control Act of 1970, and other Federal firearms and explosives laws and regulations.

The remainder of the bureau is personnel in various staff and support roles from office administrative assistants to intelligence analysts, forensic scientists, legal counsel, and technical specialists. Additionally, ATF relies heavily on state and local task force officers to supplement the Special Agents and who are not officially part of the ATF roster.

== Training ==
Basic special agent training for new hires consists of a two-part training program. The first part is the Criminal Investigator Training Program (CITP) provided by the U.S. Department of Homeland Security's Federal Law Enforcement Training Center (FLETC) in Glynco, Georgia. The CITP provides fundamental training in the techniques, concepts, and methodologies of conducting criminal investigations. Some of the subjects covered in the training include training in firearms, physical techniques, driving techniques, handcuffing, interviewing, surveillance, crime scene management, photography, basic firearms training, and federal court procedures. The CITP lasts approximately 12 weeks. Each class consists of 48 students, of whom approximately half are ATF trainees. The remaining portion of the CITP class consists of students from other federal agencies.

The second part of training is the Special Agent Basic Training (SABT), which is conducted at FLETC and covers a wide range of disciplines including firearms and ammunition identification; firearms trafficking; report writing, interviewing techniques; alcohol/tobacco diversion investigations; explosives and fire/arson investigations; firearms and tactical training, close quarter countermeasures; field operations, undercover techniques; and physical conditioning. The SABT consists of approximately 15 weeks of training with a class of 24 student trainees.

Industry Operations Investigator Basic Training (IOIBT) is a comprehensive 10-week program designed to train newly hired industry operations investigators (IOI) in the basic knowledge, skills, and abilities they need to effectively conduct inspections of firearms and explosives licensees and permittees, as well as provide assistance to other Federal, State, and local law enforcement agencies. Successful completion of IOIBT is mandatory in order for the newly hired IOI to maintain their employment.

== Special Response Teams ==
ATF's Special Response Teams (SRTs) are elite tactical groups that rapidly respond to high-risk law enforcement operations and conduct criminal investigations that lead to the arrests of the most violent criminals in the United States. Their work includes search and arrest warrants, high-risk criminal investigations, undercover operations, surveillance operations, and protective service operations. Team members are specially trained ATF special agents who may serve full or part time. They often serve in various roles such as crisis negotiators, team leaders, tactical operators, snipers, operator medics and canine handlers.

== Firearms ==
Members of ATF special agent ranks are issued the Glock 19M as their primary duty weapon and are trained in the use of, and issued, certain rifles and shotguns. The ATF Special Response Team (SRT) is armed with Colt M4 carbines and other firearms.

== Organization ==
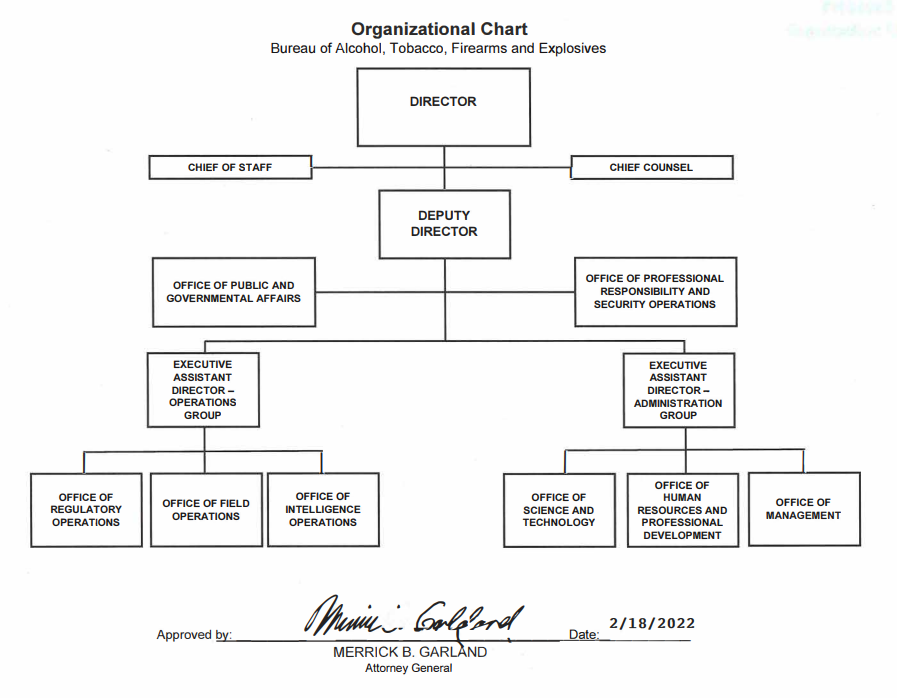
Organizational chart of the Bureau of Alcohol, Tobacco, Firearms and Explosives. The chart was signed by Merrick Garland

ATF is organized as follows:

- Director
  - Chief of Staff
  - Chief Counsel
- Deputy Director (Chief Operating Officer)
  - Office of Field Operations
  - Office of Human Resources and Professional Development
  - Office of Management
  - Office of Enforcement Programs and Services
  - Office of Professional Responsibility and Security Operations
  - Office of Public and Governmental Affairs
  - Office of Science and Technology
  - Office of Strategic Intelligence and Information

=== Field divisions ===
ATF has 25 domestic field divisions. Those cities are: Atlanta, Baltimore, Boston, Charlotte, Chicago, Columbus (OH), Dallas, Denver, Detroit, Houston, Kansas City (MO), Los Angeles, Louisville, Miami, Nashville, New Orleans, New York City, Newark, Philadelphia, Phoenix, San Francisco, Seattle, St. Paul, Tampa, and Washington, D.C. Also, there are field offices in different countries such as Canada, Mexico, El Salvador, Colombia, Iraq, Lithuania, and in the Caribbean.

== Regulation of firearms ==
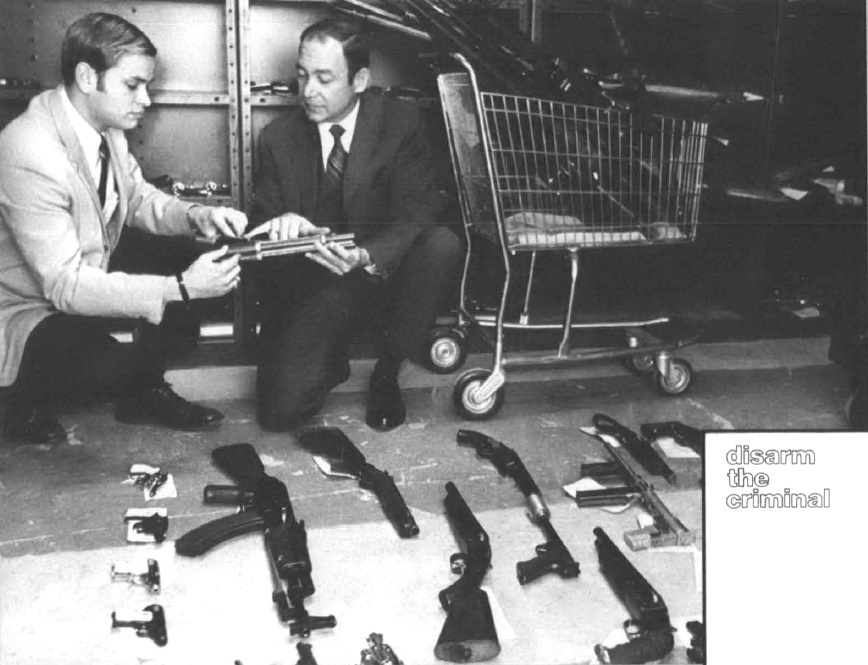
ATF investigators display weapons seized for violations of the Gun Control Act.

ATF is responsible for regulating firearm commerce in the United States. The bureau issues federal firearms licenses (FFL) to sellers and conducts firearms licensee inspections. The bureau is also involved in programs aimed at reducing gun violence in the United States, by targeting and arresting violent offenders who unlawfully possess firearms. ATF was also involved with the Youth Crime Gun Interdiction Initiative, which expanded tracing of firearms recovered by law enforcement and the ongoing Comprehensive Crime Gun Tracing Initiative. ATF also provides support to state and local investigators through the National Integrated Ballistic Information Network (NIBIN) program.

The Bipartisan Safer Communities Act (2022) created new federal statutes specifically targeting firearms trafficking and straw purchasing. The Justice Department reported 525 defendants charged under them in the law's first two years. Effective January 1, 2026, the One Big Beautiful Bill Act reduced the National Firearms Act making and transfer tax on suppressors, short-barreled rifles, short-barreled shotguns and 'any other weapons' from $200 to $0.

In 2006, Congress made the ATF director subject to Senate confirmation. Since then, the Senate has confirmed three directors: B. Todd Jones (2013), Steven Dettelbach (2022) and Robert Cekada (2026).

=== Firearms tracing ===
ATF's Comprehensive Crime Gun Tracing Initiative is the largest operation of its kind in the world. In fiscal year 2025, the National Tracing Center processed nearly 655,000 trace requests. ATF uses a Web-based system, known as eTrace, that provides law enforcement agencies with the capability to securely and electronically send trace requests, receive trace results, and conduct basic trace analysis in real time. More than 10,500 law enforcement agencies submit traces through eTrace, including 56 agencies in 52 countries. Gun tracing provides information to federal, state, local, and foreign law enforcement agencies on the history of a firearm from the manufacturer (or importer), through the distribution chain, to the first retail purchaser. This information is used to link suspects to firearms in criminal investigations, identify potential traffickers, and detect in-state, interstate, and international patterns in the sources and types of crime guns. These results are then used to help the courts prosecute the offenders and attempt to clamp down on firearm crime. After the July 13, 2024, assassination attempt on Donald Trump in Butler, Pennsylvania, the National Tracing Center completed an urgent trace using out-of-business dealer records. It provided results to the FBI and Secret Service in under 30 minutes.

=== Firearms ballistic tracing ===
In fiscal year 2025, 418 NIBIN locations generated more than 193,000 investigative leads. Since July 2016, NIBIN and eTrace have anchored ATF's Crime Gun Intelligence Centers, of which there are now 25.

== Regulation of explosives ==
With the passage of the Organized Crime Control Act (OCCA) in 1970, ATF took over the regulation of explosives in the United States, as well as prosecution of persons engaged in criminal acts involving explosives. One of the most notable investigations successfully conducted by ATF agents was the tracing of the vehicle used in the World Trade Center 1993 bombings, which led to the arrest of persons involved in the conspiracy.

ATF also enforces provisions of the Safe Explosives Act, passed after 9/11 to restrict the use/possession of explosives without a federal license to use them. ATF is considered to be the leading federal agency in most bombings that occur within the U.S., with exception to bombings related to international terrorism (investigated by the FBI).

In 1978, ATF created the National Response Team (NRT) to investigate major fires and explosions. The NRT is organized into three regional components and has been activated more than 900 times. Its activations include the 2018 Austin serial bombings, the 2020 Nashville Christmas Day bombing, and the 2023 Lahaina wildfire, whose origin-and-cause report was released in 2024.

ATF currently trains the U.S. military in evidence recovery procedures after a bombing. All ATF Agents are trained in post-blast investigation; however ATF maintains a cadre of approximately 150 highly trained explosive experts known as Certified Explosives Specialists (CES). ATF/CES Agents are trained as experts regarding Improvised Explosive Devices (IED's), as well as commercial explosives. ATF Agents work closely with state and local Bomb Disposal Units (bomb squads) within the United States.

== Directors ==
A list of ATF directors since becoming a Bureau on July 1, 1972:

Unnumbered rows denote acting directors.

No.	Image	Director	Term start	Term end	Refs.	Appointed by
1		Rex D. Davis (Note: Davis was head of the predecessor, the ATF division of the IRS, and oversaw its transition to an independent bureau.)	July 1, 1972 (Note: July 1, 1972, is the date when ATF became an independent bureau.)	July 1, 1978		Richard Nixon
–		John G. Krogman	July 2, 1978	1978		Jimmy Carter
2		Glenn Robert Dickerson	1979	March 1982		Jimmy Carter
–		Stephen Higgins	March 1982	March 28, 1983		Ronald Reagan
3		Stephen Higgins	March 29, 1983	September 30, 1993		Ronald Reagan
4		John Magaw	October 1, 1993	December 19, 1999		Bill Clinton
5		Bradley A. Buckles	December 20, 1999	January 2, 2004		Bill Clinton
–		Edgar A. Domenech	January 3, 2004	April 18, 2004		George W. Bush
6		Carl Truscott	April 19, 2004	August 8, 2006		George W. Bush
–		Edgar A. Domenech	August 9, 2006	September 2006		George W. Bush
–		Michael Sullivan	September 2006	January 20, 2009		George W. Bush
–		Ronald A. Carter	January 20, 2009	April 7, 2009		Barack Obama
–		Kenneth E. Melson	April 8, 2009	August 30, 2011		Barack Obama
–		B. Todd Jones	August 31, 2011	July 31, 2013		Barack Obama
7		B. Todd Jones	August 1, 2013	March 31, 2015		Barack Obama
–		Thomas Brandon	April 1, 2015	April 30, 2019		Barack Obama
–		Regina Lombardo	May 1, 2019	June 3, 2021		Donald Trump
–		Marvin G. Richardson	June 4, 2021	April 24, 2022		Joe Biden
–		Gary M. Restaino	April 25, 2022	July 12, 2022		Joe Biden
8		Steve Dettelbach	July 13, 2022	January 17, 2025		Joe Biden
–		Marvin G. Richardson	January 17, 2025	February 24, 2025		Joe Biden
–		Kash Patel	February 24, 2025	April 10, 2025		Donald Trump
–		Daniel P. Driscoll	April 10, 2025	April 30, 2026		Donald Trump
9		Robert Cekada	April 30, 2026	present		Donald Trump

Table notes

== Criticism ==
Some media outlets have criticized ATF, even going so far as to call for the abolition of the agency. One such criticism leveled by Reason magazine's J.D. Tuccille stated, "The nicest thing you can say about ATF is that it's an unserious and unaccountable bureaucracy. Often it's explicitly contemptible, such as during the Fast-and-Furious gun-walking scandal, and its setting up mentally disabled youths to take the fall during gun-and-drug stings. After those abuses of individual rights and public trust, the failings of the National Disposal Branch almost pale by comparison ... the Bureau of Alcohol, Tobacco, Firearms, and Explosives should be abolished, and its employees sent into the world to seek honest jobs in the private sector, if anybody will have them."

Tuccille's primary reason for the complaint related to the mishandling of information and the security of firearms that led to the theft and sale of thousands of confiscated firearms by ATF personnel to private parties. Tuccille argued that if even a fraction of said activity had occurred at a gun store instead, the store would have promptly and swiftly been shut down by ATF, but that ATF is not held to the same standards that they hold FFLs, "You have to wonder what ATF would say about a private facility that was ripped off for years on end by its own staffers and still failed to implement serious security measures after the fact. I expect that the consequences would be a bit more serious than a single arrest and then business as usual despite a tut-tutting reprimand."

ATF has also received criticism involving financial corruption. In 2021, a whistleblower informed the public that ATF had given a 25% monetary bonus to at least 94 of its employees. The benefit is known as Law Enforcement Availability Pay, or Leap, and that the increase was reserved for "criminal investigators", who are on call and expected to work unscheduled additional hours. It was noted by the whistleblower that many administrative officials were receiving this benefit, despite not being classified as criminal investigators.

== See also ==
- Title 27 of the Code of Federal Regulations
- ATF gunwalking scandal
- Center for Intelligence and Security Studies
- Diplomatic Security Service (DSS)
- Drug Enforcement Administration (DEA)
- Immigration and Customs Enforcement (ICE)
- List of ATF Controversies
- List of United States federal law enforcement agencies
- Under and Alone
