= Restricted Duty Ribbon =

Coast Guard Restricted Duty Ribbon
- Restricted Duty Ribbon
- Type: Ribbon
- Presented by: U. S. Department of Homeland Security
- Eligibility: Completion of a PCS tour at specific shore units where accompanying dependents are not authorized.
- Status: Current
- First award: 1984

Precedence
- Next (higher): Coast Guard Sea Service Ribbon
- Next (lower): Coast Guard Overseas Service Ribbon

The Restricted Duty Ribbon is a decoration of the United States Coast Guard which was created on March 3, 1984. The award recognizes those Coast Guard personnel who have completed a permanent tour of duty at specific shore units where accompanying dependents are not authorized.

Where a service member is assigned without their dependent family members, the duty status is known as "unaccompanied." Standard unaccompanied duty tours are normally one to two years in length and occur in remote duty locations such as Greenland and the Arctic, and in combat areas. The Restricted Duty Ribbon is awarded at the conclusion of the unaccompanied tour.

In the case of overseas restricted duty stations, personnel who are eligible to receive the Restricted Duty Ribbon are not eligible to receive the Coast Guard Overseas Service Ribbon for the same period.

The Coast Guard is the only branch of the United States armed forces to award a decoration for the completion of unaccompanied duty tours, although the assignments for which the Air Force Overseas Short Tour Service Ribbon is awarded are usually unaccompanied. Additional awards of the Restricted Duty Ribbon are denoted by bronze and silver service stars.
