= Carl Truscott =

American Secret Service agent and official

Carl Joseph Truscott

6th Director of the Bureau of Alcohol, Tobacco, Firearms and Explosives
- In office 2004–2006
- Appointed by: John Ashcroft
- Preceded by: Bradley A. Buckles; Edgar A. Domenech (acting)
- Succeeded by: Edgar A. Domenech (acting); Michael J. Sullivan (acting)

Carl Joseph Truscott is an American security expert and was the sixth Director of the Bureau of Alcohol, Tobacco, Firearms and Explosives (ATF) in the United States Department of Justice under George W. Bush, a position he held from 2004 to 2006.

== Education ==
Truscott earned a Bachelor of Science degree in Criminal Justice from the University of Delaware in 1979, and attended an executive program at Harvard University.

== Career ==
Truscott began his law enforcement career in 1980 as an Investigator for the New Jersey Department of Law and Public Safety.

Soon after, he joined the United States Secret Service where he served for 22 years rising to the position Assistant Director of the Office of Protective Research.

Truscott served as Special Agent in Charge of the Presidential Protective Division and was responsible for the overall security of the President, the First Family and the White House. He served two tours of duty in the Presidential Protective Division at the White House and protected Presidents Ronald Reagan, George H. W. Bush, William J. Clinton and George W. Bush.

=== Bureau of Alcohol, Tobacco, Firearms and Explosives ===
Attorney General John Ashcroft appointed Truscott head of ATF in 2004.

Truscott was the subject of an Inspector General's Office Investigation in early 2006 in regards to lavish spending and misuse of agency resources. He resigned six months later.

=== ASERO Worldwide ===
Truscott is currently a senior executive at ASERO Worldwide, a security consulting firm.

Government offices
Preceded by Bradley A. Buckles	6th Director of the Bureau of Alcohol, Tobacco, Firearms and Explosives; 2004–2006	Succeeded by B. Todd Jones
