= John Magaw =

American former police officer and administrator

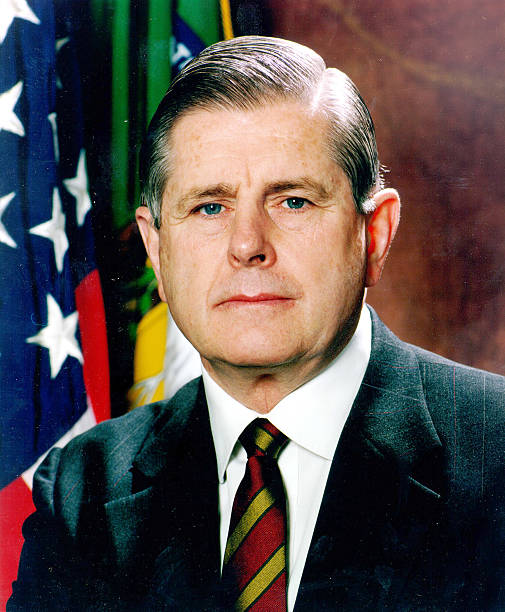

Under Secretary of Transportation for Security
- In office January 28, 2002 – July 18, 2002
- President: George W. Bush
- Preceded by: Position established
- Succeeded by: James Loy

Acting Administrator of the Federal Emergency Management Agency
- In office January 20, 2001 – February 15, 2001
- President: George W. Bush
- Preceded by: James Lee Witt
- Succeeded by: Joe Allbaugh

4th Director of the Bureau of Alcohol, Tobacco, and Firearms
- In office October 1, 1993 – December 19, 1999
- President: Bill Clinton
- Preceded by: Stephen Higgins
- Succeeded by: Bradley A. Buckles

17th Director of the United States Secret Service
- In office 1992 – December 7, 1993
- President: George H. W. Bush
- Preceded by: John Simpson
- Succeeded by: Eljay Bowron

Personal details
- Born: John William Magaw; August 1935 (age 91) Columbus, Ohio, U.S.
- Education: Otterbein University (BS)

John William Magaw (born 1935) is an American former police officer and administrator for the United States Federal Government. He received a Bachelor of Science degree in education from Otterbein College, in Westerville, Ohio in 1957. He began his career in public service in 1959 as a state trooper with the Ohio State Highway Patrol.

Magaw became a special agent with the United States Secret Service in 1967. While he was at the Secret Service he served as deputy special agent in charge of the Vice Presidential protective division and head of the Washington field office. By 1992, Magaw was in charge of all protective operations for the President and First family. Magaw was Director of the United States Secret Service from 1992 to 1993.

The Waco siege in 1993 did not reflect well on the Bureau of Alcohol, Tobacco, and Firearms (ATF). After an investigation, U.S. Secretary of the Treasury purged its senior leadership and appointed Magaw as its fourth director. Morale in the agency improved during his tenure from 1993 to 1999.

Magaw was appointed senior advisor to the director of the Federal Emergency Management Agency (FEMA) for terrorism preparedness in December 1999. In that role, he planned and coordinated FEMA's domestic terrorism preparedness efforts. He later served as acting director from January 20, 2001, to February 15, 2001. After Joe Allbaugh's confirmation to FEMA director, Magaw held other positions within FEMA.

U.S. Secretary of Transportation Norman Mineta, and his deputy, chose Magaw to stand up the new Transportation Security Administration, for his law enforcement experience and successful leadership of ATF. President George W. Bush agreed, and in January 2002 the U.S. Senate confirmed Magaw as Under Secretary of Transportation Security. He oversaw the initial standup of the TSA. His tough approach to airport security produced long lines and inconvenience for travelers, angering stakeholders. Not allowing pilots to arm themselves also sparked controversy. He didn't cultivate his public image, nor tend to relations with the U.S. Congress. He left TSA in June 2002, with former United States Coast Guard Admiral James Loy replacing him. Magaw lasted six months at TSA; his successor lasted ten months.

Magaw received the Presidential Rank Meritorious Award in 1991 and 1999, as well as the Presidential Rank Distinguished Award in 1995.

As of 2018, Magaw is a member of the Homeland Security Advisory Council.

Government offices
Preceded by John Simpson	17th Director of the United States Secret Service; 1992–1993	Succeeded by Eljay B. Bowron
Preceded by Stephen Higgins	4th Director of the Bureau of Alcohol, Tobacco, Firearms and Explosives; 1993–1999	Succeeded by Bradley A. Buckles
Preceded by James Lee Witt	Administrator of the Federal Emergency Management Agency; Acting; 2001	Succeeded by Joe Allbaugh
New office	Under Secretary of Transportation for Security; 2002	Succeeded by James Loy
