= Sea Service Ribbon =

Award of the United States Navy

A Sea Service Ribbon is an award of the United States Navy, U.S. Marine Corps, U.S. Coast Guard, the U.S. Army, and the NOAA Commissioned Officer Corps which recognizes those service members who have performed military duty while stationed on a United States Navy, Coast Guard, Army, or NOAA vessel at sea and/or members of the Navy, Marine Corps or Coast Guard who have been forward-deployed with their home unit.

Additional awards of the Sea Service Deployment Ribbon, Naval Reserve Sea Service Ribbon, Coast Guard Sea Service Ribbon, Army Sea Duty Ribbon, and NOAA Corps Sea Service Deployment Ribbon are denoted by bronze and/or silver service stars on the ribbon.

== U.S. Army Sea Duty Ribbon ==
U.S. Army Sea Duty Ribbon. Next Higher: Army Recruiting Ribbon. Next Lower: Armed Forces Reserve Medal

The U.S. Army Sea Duty Ribbon (ASDR) was established on 17 April 2006 as the "Army Sea Duty Ribbon"; its name was changed to its current moniker on 30 June 2010. It may be awarded to active duty soldiers who complete two cumulative years of sea duty on a Class A or B U.S. Army vessel. Duty aboard U.S. Navy, U.S. Coast Guard, U.S. Navy Military Sealift Command, NOAA vessels, or aboard Army leased or foreign and non–military vessels may also qualify if soldiers serving on those vessels have a formally assigned primary mission that is accomplished underway, are in an active status, and are approved for creditable sea service by the Career Sea Pay Office. The Chief of the Marine Qualification Division is the approval authority for award of the ASDR to eligible service members. The ASDR may be awarded retroactively to those personnel who were credited with qualifying service, as defined in regulations, after August 1, 1952. Subsequent awards are authorized upon completion of an additional two years of cumulative sea duty under qualifying conditions.

U.S. Army Reserve and U.S. Army National Guard soldiers must have two creditable years in a U.S. Army watercraft unit, including a minimum of 25 days underway annually as well as two annual training exercises underway on a Class A or B army vessel; or a 90-day deployment aboard an army vessel underway. Subsequent awards are authorized upon the completion of additional qualifying periods of sea duty. For mobilized soldiers, one year of sea duty as a mobilized soldier will be credited toward one creditable year as long as minimum underway requirements are met.

The U.S. Army Sea Duty Ribbon is 1 3/8 in (35 mm) wide, composed of vertical stripes. The edges are 3/32 in (2.4 mm) in navy blue, bordered by 5/32 in (4.0 mm) scarlet stripes, followed by 5/32 in (4.0 mm) stripes of old gold, bordered by 3/32 in (2.4 mm) stripes of teal blue, next to 1/8 in (3.2 mm) stripes of grotto blue, bordered by 3/64 in (1.2 mm) stripes of soldier red, and a 1/32 in (0.79 mm) center stripe of old gold. Subsequent awards are denoted by bronze and silver service stars.

== Navy and Marine Corps Sea Service Deployment Ribbon ==
Navy and Marine Corps Sea Service Deployment Ribbon Next Higher: Military Outstanding Volunteer Service Medal. Next Lower: Navy Arctic Service Ribbon

The Navy and Marine Corps Sea Service Deployment Ribbon (SSDR) is a service award of the U.S. Navy and U.S. Marine Corps which was authorized in May 1980 and retroactively authorized to 15 August 1974, coinciding with a temporary suspension in authority for award of the National Defense Service Medal between that date and 2 August 1990. It was the first type of sea service ribbon established in the U.S. Armed Forces.

The Sea Service Deployment Ribbon is granted to any member of the U.S. Navy or U.S. Marine Corps assigned to a deployable unit (e.g., a ship (including submarines), aircraft squadron, air wing or air group, detachment, battalion, Marine Expeditionary Unit, Marine Air Ground Task Force, or other unit type that operates away from its assigned homeport) and is forward-deployed for a period of either 90 consecutive days or two periods of at least 80 days each within a given 12-month period; or 6 months stationed overseas in a forward deployed location. Staffs of embarked Destroyer Squadrons (DESRONs), Amphibious Squadrons (PHIBRONs), Amphibious Readiness Groups (ARG), Expeditionary Strike Groups (ESGs), Carrier Strike Groups (CSGs) and similar units deployed within time period requirements are also eligible for award. A 3/16-inch (4.8 mm) bronze star is awarded for the second through the fifth award of the ribbon; a 3/16-inch (4.8 mm) silver star would be worn in lieu of five 3/16-inch bronze stars.

When a ship's crew qualifies for the Sea Service Deployment Ribbon, the ship is authorized to paint and display the ribbon and award stars on the port and starboard side of the bulwark aft to designate the number of deployments conducted throughout the commissioned life of the ship since August 1974.

When a U.S. Navy or U.S. Marine Corps aviation squadron qualifies for the Sea Service Deployment Ribbon, the squadron is authorized to paint and display the ribbon and award stars on the exterior or interior of their hangar or squadron spaces to designate the number of deployments conducted throughout the active life of that squadron since August 1974.

== Navy Reserve Sea Service Deployment Ribbon ==
Navy Reserve Sea Service Deployment Ribbon

The Navy Reserve Sea Service Deployment Ribbon (f/k/a Naval Reserve Sea Service Ribbon) was created in May 1986. As of January 1, 2014, it is awarded to any member of the U.S. Navy Reserve who completes a cumulative total of 90 days of OCONUS or Underway Duty while assigned to a deployable Navy Reserve or Active-Duty unit. Active-Duty members assigned to a deployable Navy Reserve unit are also eligible for the award under the same qualifying service requirements. Qualifying service must be performed in an operational or operational support role with a deployable unit while operating underway or OCONUS, away from homeport or the permanent duty station. A member is eligible for one award upon completing 90 cumulative days of qualifying service regardless of the length of time required to accumulate the qualifying days. Additional restrictions apply to Inactive Duty Training (IDT) drill periods and travel days. For Selected Reserve (SELRES) IDT drill periods, only one day of qualifying service is authorized per calendar day regardless of the number of drill periods performed. Each travel day between a Navy Operational Support Center (NOSC)/Permanent Duty Station and the qualifying duty location is considered .5 days for purposes of counting qualifying days. Qualifying days applied to the Navy Reserve Sea Service Deployment Ribbon may not be credited towards the Sea Service Deployment Ribbon or the Navy and Marine Corps Overseas Service Ribbon.

For service prior to January 1, 2014, the former requirements still apply. Under those rules, the Naval Reserve Sea Service Ribbon was awarded to any member of the U.S. Navy Reserve (formerly U.S. Naval Reserve) who, while serving as a drilling Selected Reservist (SELRES) or a Training and Administration of the Reserve/Full Time Support (TAR/FTS) officer or sailor, completed twenty-four cumulative months of duty on board a U.S. Navy Reserve Force surface ship or assigned to a deployable/regularly deploying U.S. Navy Reserve Force Aviation Squadron (RESFORON).

The term "Navy Reserve Force Ship" refers to any U.S. Navy commissioned warship under the operational or administrative control of the Navy Reserve, or a self-propelled auxiliary, boat, or other surface craft operated under the operational control of fleet or type commanders.

The term "Navy Reserve Force Aviation Squadron" refers to any Navy Reserve flying squadron that operates naval aircraft, is considered a command at sea, routinely deploys or is capable of deploying overseas, and is considered a "hardware" unit under the operational control of Commander, Naval Air Force Reserve (formerly Commander, Naval Air Reserve Force) or fleet or other type commanders.

The Navy Reserve Sea Service Ribbon is also granted to members of embarked Navy Reserve staffs, provided that at least half of the embarked reserve drills qualified as underway drills.

The Navy Reserve Sea Service Ribbon is not eligible for service performed by Marine Corps Forces Reserve members, or Navy Reservists who were called to active duty, but the service performed by those personnel would qualify towards the Sea Service Deployment Ribbon or the Navy and Marine Corps Overseas Service Ribbon as applicable.

== Coast Guard Sea Service Ribbon ==
Coast Guard Sea Service Ribbon Next Higher: Special Operations Service Ribbon Next Lower: Restricted Duty Ribbon

The Coast Guard Sea Service Ribbon is a United States Coast Guard decoration that was created in 1984. It is awarded to those members of the Coast Guard who serve more than twelve cumulative months of sea duty on board a U.S. Coast Guard cutter, attached to a Fleet Training Group, or on board certain other Coast Guard vessels and non-Coast Guard vessels (i.e., U.S. Navy warships with a Coast Guard Law Enforcement Detachment [LEDET] embarked) that are under official Coast Guard orders. Additional awards, displayed as service stars, may be awarded for a further three years of sea service.

== NOAA Corps Sea Service Deployment Ribbon ==
NOAA Corps Sea Service Deployment Ribbon

The NOAA Corps Sea Service Deployment Ribbon is a NOAA Commissioned Corps award established retroactive to 1 January 2002. It is awarded to NOAA Commissioned Corps and Public Health Service Officers who have served twelve months accumulated sea duty, which may also include temporary duty at sea, that includes at least one 90 consecutive-day deployment. Subsequent awards may be earned for additional twelve-month accumulations of sea duty, so long as they also include an additional 90 consecutive-day deployment. Previously, the Navy Sea Service Deployment Ribbon was awarded. Those NOAA Corps members who previously earned the Navy Sea Service Deployment Ribbon replace it with the NOAA version, unless they earned the Navy version while serving in the Navy.

== See also ==
- Awards and decorations of the United States Armed_Forces
- Awards and decorations of the National Oceanic and Atmospheric Administration
