= United States Coast Guard Auxiliary =

- Seal of the United States Coast Guard Auxiliary
- Founded: June 23, 1939; 87 years ago
- Country: United States
- Branch: U.S. Coast Guard
- Type: Uniformed Auxiliary Service
- Role: Search and rescue Disaster relief Recreational Boating Safety; Marine Environmental Safety and Protection
- Size: Approximately 19,000 auxiliarists
- Part of: Homeland Security
- Motto: Semper Paratus (Always Ready)
- Colors: White, Red, Blue
- March: "Semper Paratus"
- Engagements: World War II; September 11 attacks
- Decorations: Presidential Unit Citation; Department of Homeland Security Outstanding Unit Award; Coast Guard Unit Commendation
- Website: cgaux.org

Commanders
- Commandant of the Coast Guard: ADM Kevin E. Lunday
- Chief Director of Auxiliary: Captain Brent Schmadeke, USCG
- National Commodore: Commodore Patrick Feighery

Insignia
- Racing Stripe

- Flag

- Flag (1940)

The United States Coast Guard Auxiliary (USCGAUX, CGAux, or USCG Aux) is the uniformed, auxiliary service component of the United States Coast Guard. Congress established the unit on 23 June 1939, as the United States Coast Guard Reserve. On February 19, 1941, the entity was renamed the United States Coast Guard Auxiliary. The Auxiliary's purpose is to bolster all USCG undertakings both at sea and in the sky, with the exception of tasks necessitating direct law enforcement. As of 2026, the U.S. Coast Guard Auxiliary boasted around 19,000 members.

The Auxiliary collectively dedicates over 4.5 million service hours annually and has accomplished close to 500,000 missions in aid of the Coast Guard. Annually, members of the Auxiliary are instrumental in saving around 500 lives, aiding 15,000 mariners in distress, performing over 150,000 recreational vessel safety checks, and imparting boating safety knowledge to over half a million learners. Collectively, the Coast Guard Auxiliary's efforts save taxpayers several hundred million dollars every year.

== History ==
Historical Departmental
Governance

USDT 1939–1941
DoN 1941–1945
USDT 1945–1967
USDOT 1967–2003
DHS 2003–present

The advent of the single-operator motorboat, followed by the introduction of the outboard engine in the early 20th century, led to a surge in recreational boating on U.S. federal waters. By the time 1939 rolled around, over 300,000 personal watercraft were in use. In the preceding year, the Coast Guard had been alerted with 14,000 assistance requests and had addressed 8,600 situations where boaters were "in peril."

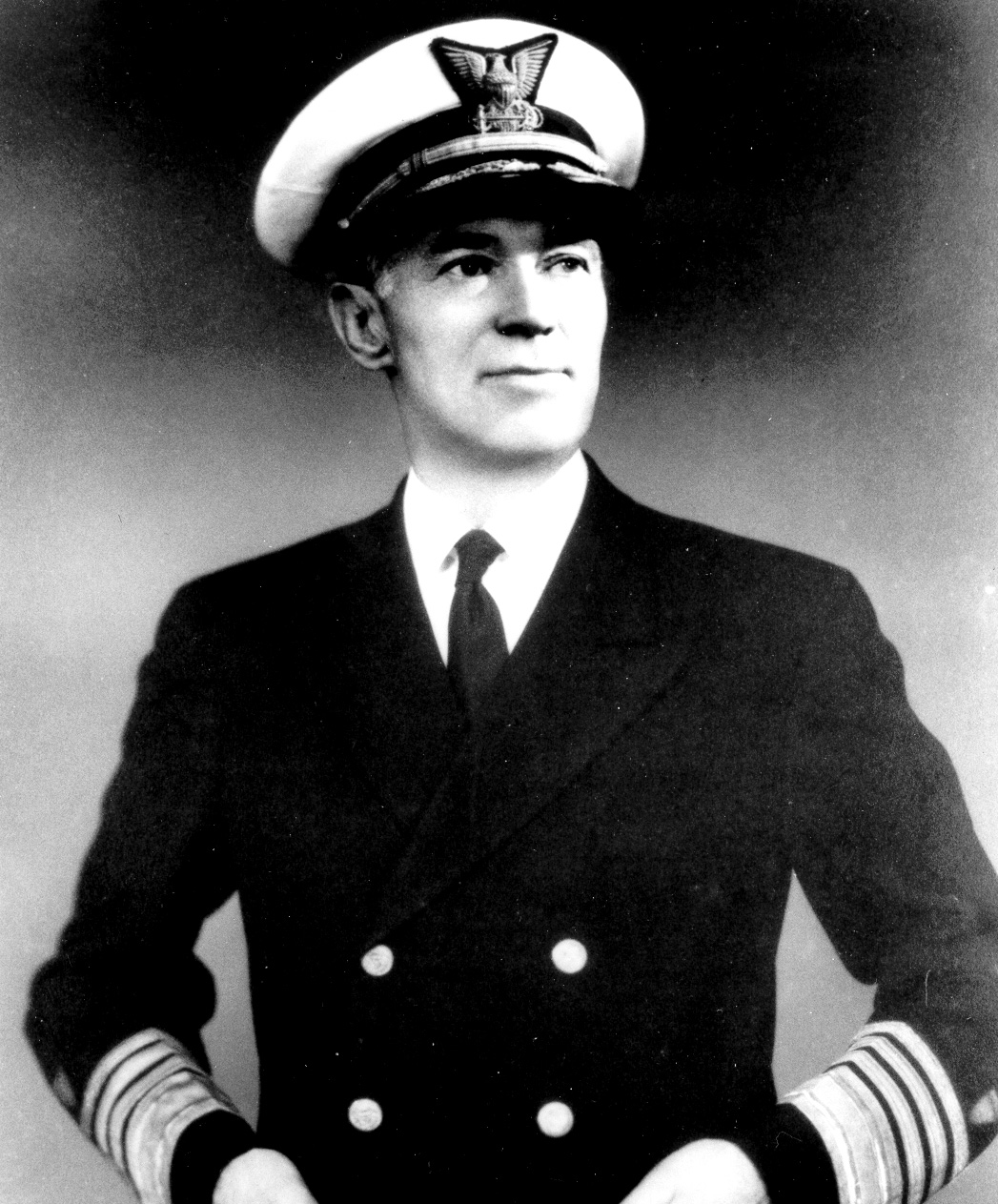
Commandant Russell Waesche is credited as the founder.

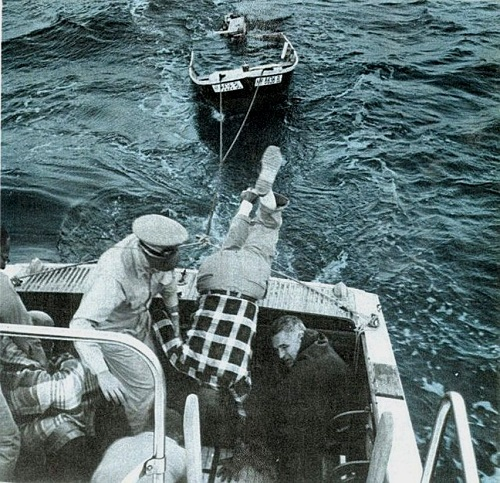
Auxiliarists in 1967 rescuing a boater off an outboard that had foundered during a storm in Long Island Sound, New York.

=== Prior to World War II ===
The U.S. Congress enacted the Coast Guard Reserve Act in 1938, establishing a volunteer reserve unit for the United States Coast Guard. Their primary duties included promoting maritime safety, enhancing boating proficiency among Americans, assisting in legal awareness and adherence, and supporting the active-duty members of the Coast Guard. Boat owners were grouped into flotillas distributed across Coast Guard districts throughout the U.S. These flotillas undertook safety and security patrols and played a role in enforcing the Federal Boating and Espionage Acts of 1940. Commandant Russell Waesche and Commodore Malcolm Stuart Boylan are credited as the founders.

In 1941, just two years after its creation, Congress passed legislation to reorganize the Coast Guard Reserve. From that point onward, the Coast Guard would maintain two reserve entities. The original volunteer group was rebranded as the Coast Guard Auxiliary. Concurrently, a new Coast Guard Reserve was established, endowed with military and law enforcement duties.

=== During World War II ===
During World War II, the Coast Guard recognized a distinct class of reservist known as the "Temporary Reservist." Many of these individuals came from the ranks of the Auxiliary. These Temporary Reservists were uniformed and armed but served without pay, akin to a home guard. Additionally, Coast Guard Headquarters set forth directives permitting certain Auxiliarists and their vessels to bear arms. In 1941 the Coast Guard, Coast Guard Reserve, and Coast Guard Auxiliary were transferred from the United States Treasury Department to the United States Department of the Navy and in 1942 the Coast Guard Auxiliary was authorized to wear military uniforms.

During World War II, Auxiliarists played a pivotal role in assisting the Coast Guard with the recruitment and training of active-duty members. In 1942, due to the escalating threat posed by German U-boats, the U.S. Navy sought the acquisition of "as many civilian craft as feasible that were capable of undertaking voyages at sea under fair weather conditions for a duration of at least 48 hours." A significant portion of vessels, both owned and navigated by Auxiliarists and crewed by Coast Guard reservists, constituted the primary American coastal defense against submarines during the initial stages of World War II, forming what was known as the "Corsair Fleet."

However, as newly built war vessels began assuming these roles, the Coast Guard phased out the use of these civilian crafts in anti-submarine warfare. Despite the fact that these 2,000 civilian vessels, equipped with deck-stowed depth charges, never succeeded in sinking a submarine, they did manage to rescue several hundred survivors from torpedo-stricken merchant ships. From 1942 onward and for the remainder of the war, both Auxiliarists and Coast Guard reservists were integral to local Port Security Forces, ensuring the protection of the maritime shipping sector.

=== Post World War II activities ===
In 1950, Bert Pouncey was elected as the National Commodore, leading to the establishment of the National Board for the Coast Guard Auxiliary. By 1955, Auxiliarists began to engage in initiatives aimed at supporting the recruitment of prospective candidates for the United States Coast Guard Academy.

The North American Boating Campaign was originally known as "Safe Boating Week," observed by the Coast Guard Auxiliary as a courtesy examination weekend in Amesbury, Massachusetts in June 1952. This tradition continued until 1957 when an official National Safe Boating Week observation took place sponsored by the United States Coast Guard Auxiliary in various parts of the country. As a result, the U.S. Coast Guard prepared a Resolution, and on 4 June 1958, President Dwight D. Eisenhower signed PL 85-445, to establish National Safe Boating Week as the first week starting on the first Sunday in June.

In the early part of 1973, due to budgetary constraints, seven Coast Guard stations on the Great Lakes were shut down. Responding to the appeals of the impacted communities, Congress mandated the reopening of these stations, placing them under the operation of the Auxiliary. Local division captains stepped up to manage these stations, ensuring that Auxiliary vessels were constantly on standby to aid vessels in distress. Subsequently, the Auxiliary assumed control of an additional seven stations located on the Mississippi and Ohio Rivers.

In 1976, the Coast Guard initiated a comprehensive assessment of the Auxiliary through a private research entity, the University Sciences Forum of Washington. After conducting interviews with pivotal figures from both the Coast Guard and the Auxiliary and scrutinizing questionnaires completed by approximately two thousand Auxiliarists, the researchers deduced that the Auxiliary was thriving. Their conclusion was succinct: "In summary," they stated, "we view the Auxiliary as the most cost-effective asset readily accessible to the COGARD. Its performance is exemplary, and its members stand out as some of the most dedicated and professional volunteers in the country."

=== Enhanced role for the auxiliarist ===
In 1996, a legislative act by Congress broadened the Auxiliary's scope, permitting its members to aid in any mission sanctioned by the Commandant of the U.S. Coast Guard. However, present policies prohibit Auxiliary members from holding deputized law enforcement powers or participating in military combat tasks. By 2004, the Coast Guard Auxiliary consisted of 35,000 members, together contributing a total of 2 million hours of service each year.

=== Under the Department of Homeland Security ===
In 2003 the Coast Guard, Coast Guard Reserve and Coast Guard Auxiliary were realigned to be under the United States Department of Homeland Security. As of 2004, the Coast Guard Auxiliary had 35,000 members who collectively provided 2 million man hours of service annually.

On 19 June 2009, the commandant of the Coast Guard awarded the Coast Guard Unit Commendation to Auxiliary members for "performance ... nothing short of stellar" from the period of 24 June 1999, to 23 June 2009. On the 75th anniversary of the USCG Auxiliary, 23 June 2014, the Commandant awarded another Coast Guard Unit Commendation ribbon to all Auxiliarists.

On 24 June 2014, the commandant of the Coast Guard ADML Paul F. Zukunft awarded the Coast Guard Unit Commendation to the Coast Guard Auxiliary for "exceptionally meritorious service from June 24, 2009 to June 23, 2014, while providing unprecedented levels of dedicated public service and operational support to the U. S. Coast Guard's missions".

On 16 May 2019, the commandant of the Coast Guard ADML Karl Schultz awarded a third Coast Guard Unit Commendation for "exceptionally meritorious service from June 24, 2014 to June 23, 2019 while providing extraordinary levels of public service and support to the United States Coast Guard".

On 25 May 2024, the commandant of the Coast Guard ADML Linda Fagan awarded the Coast Guard Unit Commendation to Coast Guard Auxiliary for "exceptionally meritorious service from June 24, 2019, to June 23, 2024, while providing extraordinary levels of public service and support to the United States Coast Guard".

== Awards and decorations ==
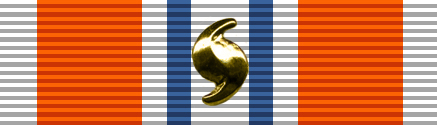

1st row	Presidential Unit Citation with Hurricane Katrina special clasp	Department of Homeland Security Outstanding Unit Award	Coast Guard Unit Commendation with one 3/16" Silver Star and one 3/16" Bronze Star

== Programs and missions ==
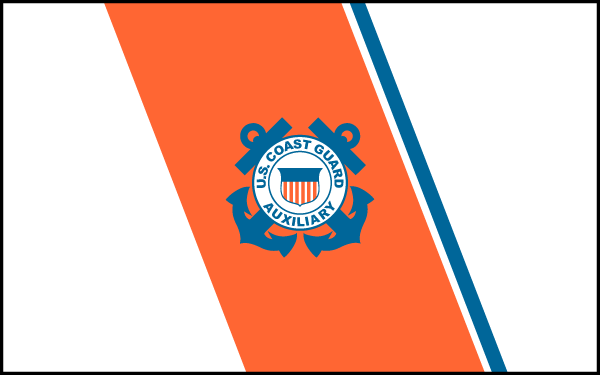
U.S. Coast Guard Auxiliary Patrol Boat Ensign

The Auxiliary primarily acts as a force enhancer for the Coast Guard. Auxiliarists are dedicated to fostering safety, security, and aid for the citizens of the United States, whether it's in harbors, seaports, along the coasts, on the country's canals, rivers, or even in the skies. The task of promoting and enhancing recreational boater safety has been fully entrusted to the Auxiliary by the USCG. Furthermore, the Auxiliary actively aids both active-duty members and reservists in executing a range of missions, including search and rescue, marine safety, management of waterways, environmental preservation, and various duties related to homeland security.

=== Missions ===
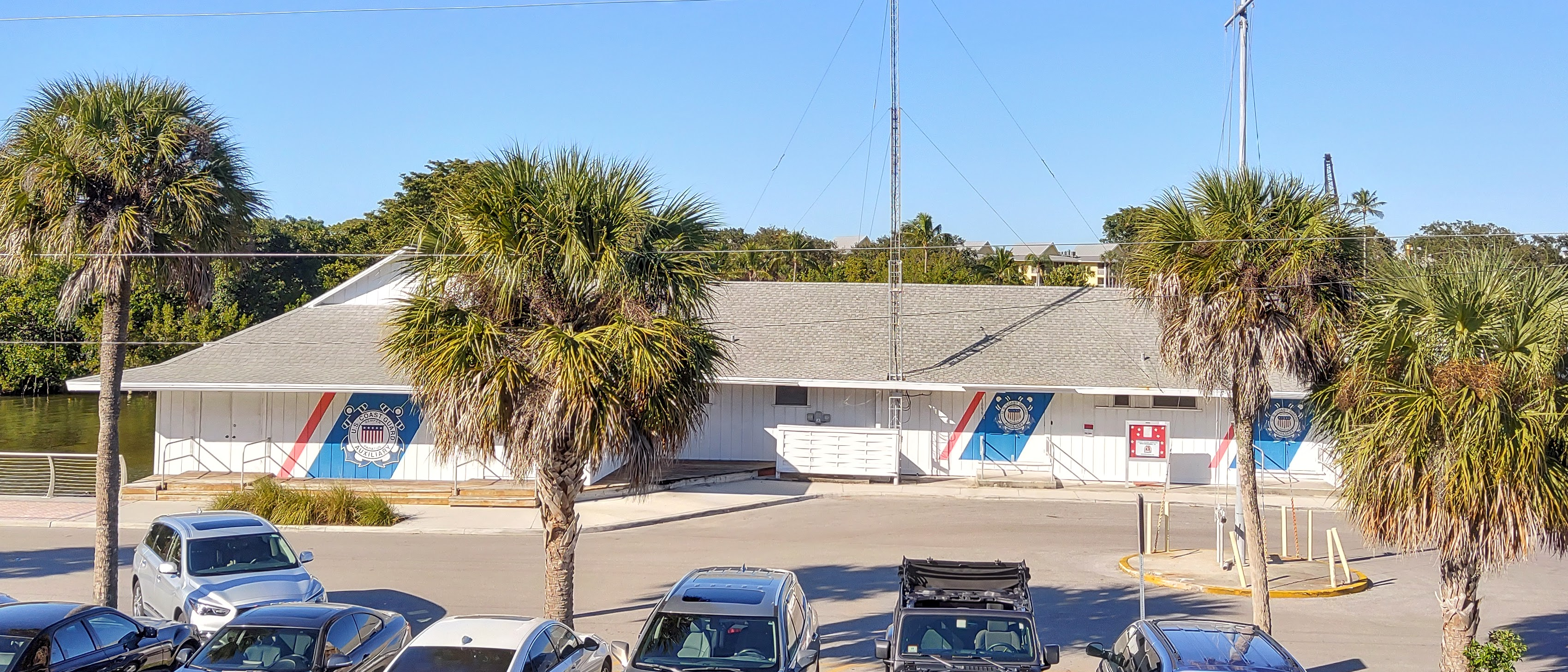
The United States Coast Guard Auxiliary Flotilla 9-3 in Naples, Florida.

- Maritime Domain Awareness Air Patrols
- Academy Introduction Mission (AIM)
- Active Duty Administrative Support
- Administration of Bridges
- Aids to Navigation
- America's Waterway Watch Program
- Contingency Preparedness
- Inspections of commercial vessels
- Licensing for Merchant Mariners
- Logistic Air Transport
- Management of Waterways
- Air Reconnaissance Ice Patrols
- Marine Environmental Safety and Protection
- Operational Support
- Waterway Security & Safety
- Public Education
- Recreational Boating Safety
- Search and Rescue
- Support for USCG Civil Engineering Units
- Support for Public Affairs
- Auxiliary Chaplain Support
- USCG Communications
- Watchstanding
- Support for Recruiting

=== Recreational Boating Safety ===
The Auxiliary's most prominent role is promoting recreational boating safety ("RBS" in Auxiliary parlance). The Auxiliary has several distinct programs that support this mission, most visibly:

- Providing free Vessel Safety Checks (formerly "Courtesy Marine Examinations") to recreational boaters;
- Delivering a Public Education (or "PE") program, which consists of a range of courses on boating-related topics such as seamanship, knots, laws and regulations related to boating, weather, and navigation; and
- Acting as a liaison to local businesses/organizations (such as marinas, boating clubs, civic clubs, etc.) through RBS Partnership Program Visitors (formerly "Marine Dealer Visitors).

=== Surface and Air Operations ===
The Coast Guard Auxiliary participates in both surface and aerial activities, termed "AUXAIR," to bolster the Coast Guard's efforts in areas like search & rescue, marine safety/security, environmental protection/response, and to some degree, tasks related to law enforcement and national defense. Auxiliarists who possess boats and aircraft have the option to provide them for Coast Guard use, designating them as Auxiliary "facilities." Auxiliarists qualified as boat crewmen, coxswains, pilots, air crew, and air observers can take part in these activities. Beyond their primary roles, Auxiliary aircraft can also serve as official modes of transportation for active-duty members when commercial travel options are either impractical or not suitable.

=== Auxiliary University Programs ===
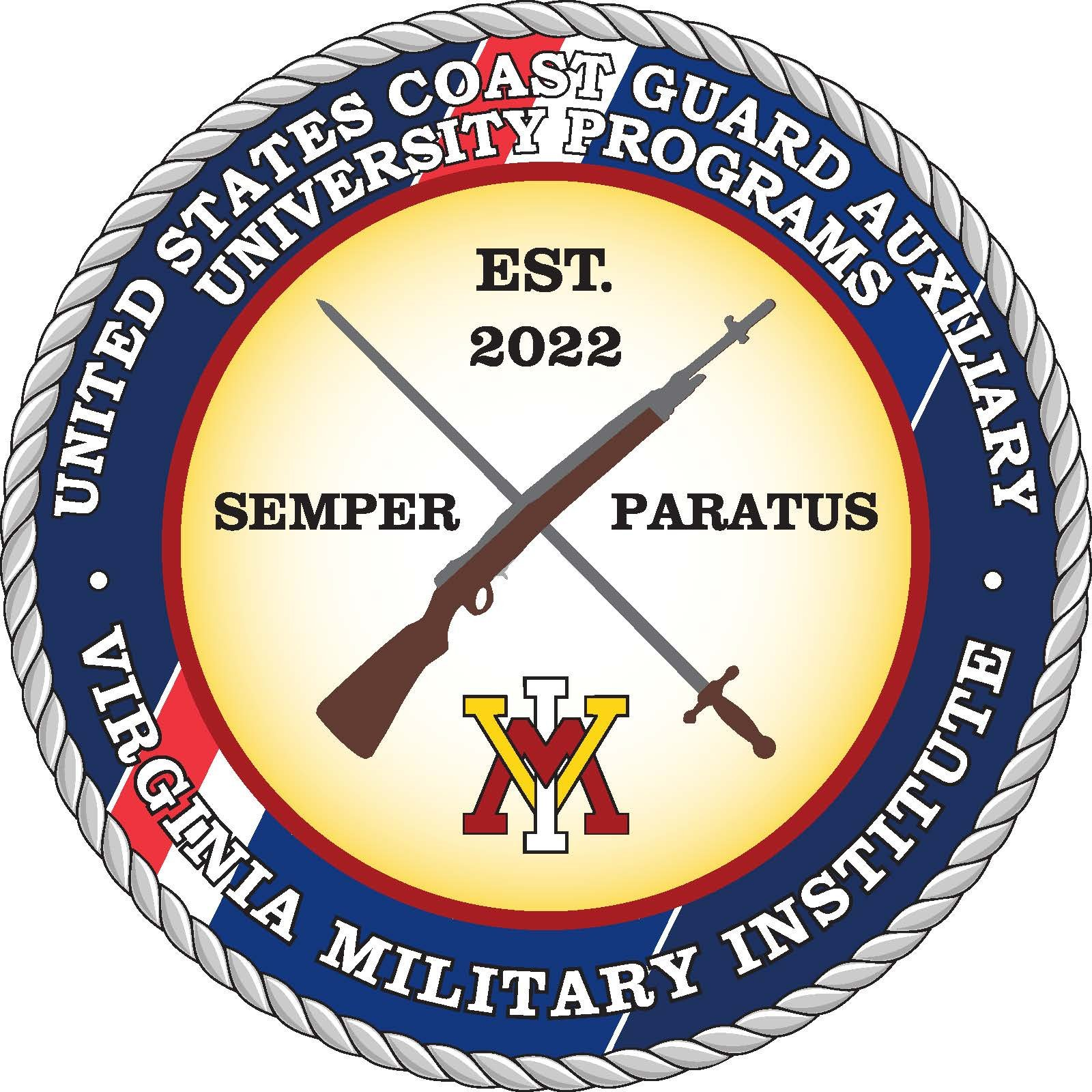
The badge of the U.S. Coast Guard Auxiliary University Programs unit at the Virginia Military Institute

The Auxiliary University Programs (AUP) is a Coast Guard Auxiliary-managed initiative established in 2007. Presently, AUP comprises almost 300 members distributed across 16 units, representing over 30 academic institutions throughout the United States. The AUP, or Auxiliary University Programs, is designed to groom undergraduate and graduate students for prospective roles in public service, both within the Coast Guard and beyond. Drawing inspiration from ROTC (Reserve Officers' Training Corps) programs, the AUP offers students insights into Coast Guard career paths without mandating a service obligation. Broadly, the program imparts knowledge on seamanship and leadership while promoting the ethos of public service. AUP has a positive track record of getting a large number of its graduates into Coast Guard Officer Candidate School and also offers an Internship Program.

=== Augmentation ===
In addition to employing vessels and aircraft owned and operated by Auxiliarists, the Coast Guard leverages individual Auxiliarists to directly support active-duty operations. It's common to find Auxiliarists taking on a variety of roles such as manning radio stations, aiding in boat upkeep, handling administrative tasks, cooking, acting as morale officers, and fulfilling other supportive roles at various Coast Guard units, especially at small boat stations. On other occasions, Auxiliarists might be stationed aboard cutters, serving as cooks, interpreters for foreign languages, or other similar auxiliary capacities. The Auxiliary also trains and provides members on an as-needed basis in areas such as emergency management.

The Coast Guard, equipped with only a singular regular military band and color guard, occasionally calls upon Auxiliarists to step into these roles for significant occasions like ship christenings and change-of-command ceremonies. Moreover, the United States Coast Guard Pipe Band comprises members from both the Coast Guard Reserve and the Coast Guard Auxiliary.

Auxiliarists with expertise in health care, legal assistance, financial counseling, or clergy roles can leverage their professional qualifications and experience to support active duty/reserve Coast Guard personnel and their families, whether on a continuous or as-needed basis. For instance, health care professional Auxiliarists might offer their services at Public Health Service clinics catering to the Coast Guard community. Likewise, Auxiliarists with legal expertise often assist Coast Guard members in navigating insurance claims, addressing landlord-tenant disagreements, and managing other civil issues.

Auxiliarists are sometimes also dispatched to support the missions/activities of other federal, state, and local agencies, and civic organizations such as the Civil Air Patrol. For example, Auxiliarists have voluntarily deployed in support of disaster relief operations (notably Hurricane Katrina) and to provide support to Immigration and Customs Enforcement at the U.S.-Mexico border.

== Organization ==
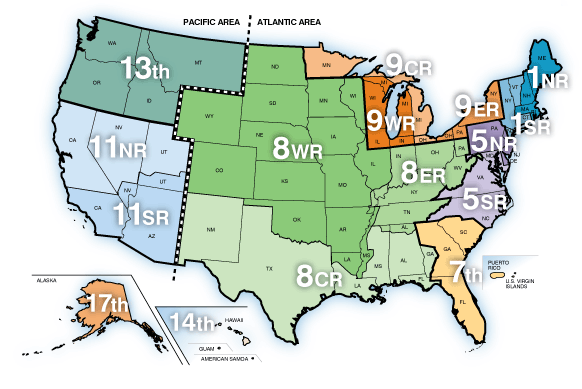
The U.S. Coast Guard Auxiliary is divided into three geographic areas: Pacific, Atlantic West, and Atlantic East. The three areas are subdivided into district and divisions, with the smallest unit of organization being the flotilla (not represented on this map).

The organizational structure of the Coast Guard places the Coast Guard Auxiliary within the Office of Auxiliary and Boating Safety (CG-BSX), specifically in the Auxiliary Division (CG-BSX-1). This is nested under the purview of the office of the Deputy Commandant for Operations (CG-DCO) at Coast Guard Headquarters. Further down the chain, CG-DCO supervises the Assistant Commandant for Marine Safety, Security, and Stewardship (CG-5). CG-5 then oversees the Director of Prevention Policy (CG-54), who subsequently supervises CG-542.

The Coast Guard Auxiliary boasts units spread across all 50 U.S. states, as well as in Puerto Rico, the Virgin Islands, American Samoa, and Guam. Functioning under the direct jurisdiction of the U.S. Department of Homeland Security through the Commandant of the U.S. Coast Guard, the Auxiliary's internal operational structure is delineated into four primary organizational tiers: Flotilla, Division, District, and National.

- Flotillas: A Flotilla stands as the foundational unit of the Auxiliary. A flotilla is ideally composed of a minimum of 10 members, but many flotillas can boast memberships exceeding 100 individuals. The bulk of the Auxiliary's routine operations are executed at the flotilla level. Every member enters the Auxiliary through a flotilla and directs their annual membership fees to this foundational unit. Typically, flotillas convene on a monthly schedule, and they often welcome both visitors and those interested in joining.
- Divisions: At least four (4) flotillas form a Division, which provides leadership, direction, and staff assistance to the flotillas so that their programs can run effectively.
- Districts/Regions: There are several divisions in a District. The District provides leadership and staff assistance to the Divisions. Each Auxiliary District is supervised by a Director of the Auxiliary who is an Active Duty Coast Guard officer usually holding the rank of Commander. Auxiliary Districts generally coincide with Coast Guard Districts.
- Areas: Three Deputy National Commodores are responsible for three geographic areas: Atlantic East, Atlantic West, and Pacific Area, respectively.
- National: The Auxiliary's governance structure is overseen by national officers who, in collaboration with the Commandant, manage its administration and overarching policy determinations. Central to this architecture is the National Executive Committee (NEXCOM). This includes the Chief Director of Auxiliary (CHDIRAUX) — an active-duty officer, the National Commodore (NACO), the Immediate Past National Commodore (IPNACO), the Vice National Commodore (VNACO), and four Deputy National Commodores (DNACOs). These figures are part of the broader National Staff Operating Committee (OPCOM). OPCOM, in its entirety, consists of twenty-nine members: the eight members from NEXCOM as outlined, an additional eight from the National Executive Staff which includes Assistant National Commodores (ANACO), and a set of fourteen Directorate Directors (DIR). This cohesive structure ensures the effective operation and leadership of the Auxiliary at the national scale. The aforementioned individuals, combined with their specific teams in the different national directorates, constitute the Auxiliary Headquarters organization. The Chief Director, a senior officer within the Coast Guard, oversees the administration of the Auxiliary, basing decisions on policies set by the Commandant. The overarching management of the Auxiliary falls to the Deputy Commandant for Operations (CG-DCO), who directly reports to the Commandant (CCG).

== Leadership and staffing ==
District Commodores and District Chiefs of Staff are elected to a two-year term. Division Commanders, Division Vice Commanders, Flotilla Commanders, and Flotilla Vice Commanders are elected annually to provide overall organizational leadership. Staff officers are appointed by these elected officers to oversee various program areas.

The Coast Guard Auxiliary does not have a military chain of command; it does, however, have a similar concept called the "Chain of Leadership and Management" (or "COLM"). Auxiliarists are expected to adhere to the COLM when issuing instructions and seeking direction/guidance on policy matters. There are actually two COLMs. Staff officers at each level report to both their own elected unit leader and to the staff officer in the equivalent position at the next highest level of the organization (this is known as "parallel staffing"). For example, a Flotilla Staff Officer (FSO) overseeing the flotilla's public education program (the "FSO-PE") reports to both his/her own Flotilla Commander (through the Flotilla Vice Commander) and the division Staff Officer for public education (the "SO-PE").

=== National officers ===
The national leadership is elected once every two years. National officer positions include the following:

- The National Commodore (NACO) of the United States Coast Guard Auxiliary is the most senior and principal officer of the United States Coast Guard Auxiliary. The NACO represents the Auxiliary and reports to the Commandant of the Coast Guard through the Vice Commandant of the Coast Guard. Additionally, the NACO represents the Auxiliary with all Coast Guard flag officers and flag officer equivalent civilians at Coast Guard headquarters on Auxiliary matters. The NACO functions to support the Commandant's strategic goals and objectives and serve auxiliarists.
- Vice National Commodore (VNACO) – The VNACO is the chief operating officer of the Coast Guard Auxiliary and reports to the National Commodore (NACO). Additionally, the VNACO represents the Auxiliary at the direction of the NACO with all Coast Guard Flag officers and Flag officer equivalent civilians at Coast Guard Headquarters on Auxiliary matters.
- Deputy National Commodore (DNACO) – The Auxiliary has four Deputy National Commodores (DNACO) who report to the Vice National Commodore. Three are elected (Mission Support, Operations, and Recreational Boating Safety), and one is appointed (Information Technology and Planning). Each DNACO has a specific set of operational areas of responsibility to include one or more of the appointed Assistant National Commodores (staff officers). Additionally, each of the three elected DNACOs are the reporting point for approximately one third of the 16 District Commodores, grouped by geographical area, who are elected every two years to lead their local membership.
- Assistant National Commodore (ANACO) – Eight Assistant National Commodores form the National Executive Staff and are appointed to either lead multiple national directorates or perform specialized roles (such as Chief Counsel or Diversity). They are expected to consult and coordinate with appropriate Coast Guard Flag officers and program managers in coordination with the Chief Director to determine requirements for Auxiliary resources used within their areas of responsibilities and develop and manage Auxiliary programs consistent with Coast Guard needs and objectives.
- Immediate Past National Commodore (NIPCO) – The NIPCO is the most recent predecessor of the National Commodore office and serves on the National Executive Committee.
- Director (DIR) – Appointed top officers of the Auxiliary's various National Directorates: Government & Public Affairs (A); RBS Outreach (B); Computer Software & Systems (C); Public Education (E); Human Resources (H); International Affairs (I); Performance Management (M); Prevention (P); Emergency Management & Disaster Response (Q); Response (R); Strategic Planning (S); Training (T); IT User Support & Services (U); Vessel Examination & RBS Visitation (V), and Cybersecurity (Y).
- Deputy Director (DIRd) – Appointed aide officers of the Auxiliary's various National Directorate Directors. They are the second-highest appointed officers within a Directorate and lead alongside the Directors.
- Division Chief (DVC) – The DVCs manage a broad program sector within each directorate under the director and deputy director.
- Branch Chief (BC) – The BCs oversee specialized functions and programs on the National Staff, and are directly responsible for carrying out many of the National Staff functions within their Directorate. They work under the direction of the Division Chief.
- Branch Assistant (BA) – The BAs serve as support staff under a Branch Chief, carrying out national-level tasks and duties provided by their respective BC.

=== District officers ===
- District Director of the Auxiliary (DIRAUX) – An active duty Coast Guard officer, usually a commander, who is dedicated full-time to Auxiliary functions in his or her district. The DIRAUX has sole responsibility for enrolling a new member or for disenrolling an existing member. The DIRAUX is also the final authority in all matters related to his or her Auxiliary district. Each DIRAUX has small staff of active duty members, Auxiliarists, and civilian employees to assist with these functions.
- District Commodore (DCO) – The highest elected officer within the district, elected by the Division Commanders, the District Commodore supervises all Auxiliary activities within his or her district.
- District Chief of Staff (DCOS) (formerly District Vice Commodore [VCO]) – The district's Chief of Staff and Assistant to the District Commodore. Elected by the Division Commanders in the district.
- District Captains (DCAPT) (formerly District Rear Commodore [RCO]) (two or more per district) – Elected by all Division Commanders and usually supervise a group of divisions in a district. They may also have programmatic responsibilities.
- District Directorate Chiefs (DDC) – Some districts appoint DDCs based on the three major areas of Auxiliary activity (i.e., Prevention, Response, and Logistics). They are appointed by the DCO and approved by DIRAUX.
- District Staff Officers (DSO) – Manage the district's departments and programs; appointed by the DCO and approved by DIRAUX.
- Assistant District Staff Officers (ADSO) – Assist with the management of district departments under the direction and guidance of the DSO; appointed by the DCO with concurrence of DCOS. DSO's report to the DCOS (through a DDC, where applicable).

=== Division officers ===
- Division Commander (DCDR) (formerly Division Captain) – The highest elected Auxiliary leader within a division. Elected by the Flotilla Commanders in a Division.
- Division Vice Commander (VCDR) (formerly Division Vice Captain) – Division Chief of Staff and assistant to the Division Commander. Elected by the Flotilla Commanders in a division.
- Division Staff Officers (SO) – Manage the division's departments and programs; appointed by the DCDR.

=== Flotilla officers ===
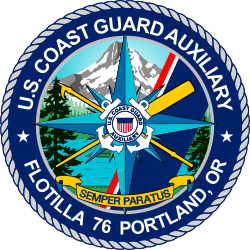
U.S. Coast Guard Auxiliary Flotilla 76 Portland, Oregon, Unit Emblem

A U.S. Coast Guard Dolphin HH65 helicopter trains in basket hoisting with Coast Guard Auxiliary vessels and auxiliarists near Los Angeles, California in about 2009.

Titles and duties of flotilla officers are dictated by the Auxiliary Manual.

- Flotilla Commander (FC) – The highest elected Auxiliary leader within a flotilla. He/she is elected by the members of a flotilla. Recommends new members for enrollment to the DIRAUX.
- Flotilla Vice Commander (VFC) – The flotilla's Chief of Staff and assistant to the Flotilla Commander. Elected by the members of a Flotilla.
- Flotilla Staff Officers (FSO) – Responsible for managing the flotilla's departments and programs; appointed by the FC.
- Detachment Leader (DL) – Serves as the leader for a DIRAUX approved flotilla detachment. This officer is appointed by the FC and wears the insignia of an FSO.

=== Staff officers ===
To effectively execute the Auxiliary program, Division Commanders (DCDRs) and Flotilla Commanders (FCs) have the authority to appoint staff officers at the flotilla and division levels. At the district level, the District Commodore (DCO) is responsible for appointing district staff officers. The designations for these roles vary based on their level within the organization: at the flotilla level, the abbreviation is FSO; for the division level, it's SO; and at the district level, DSO is used. For instance, the term SO-CS denotes the Division Communications Services officer.

The list of staff officers, with their official abbreviations, is:

- Aviation (AV) (district level only)
- Culinary Assistance (CA)
- Communications (CM)
- Communication Services (CS)
- Diversity (DV) (Discontinued 2025)
- Finance (FN)
- Flight Safety Officer (DFSO) (district level only)
- Food Service (FS) (division level and above)
- Human Resources (HR)
- Information Services (IS)
- Legal/Parliamentarian (LP) (district level only)
- Marine Safety and Environmental Protection (MS)
- Materials (MA)
- Member Training (MT)
- Navigation Systems (NS)
- Operations (OP)
- Public Affairs (PA)
- Publications (PB)
- Public Education (PE)
- Recreational Boating Safety Visitation Program (PV)
- Rescue & Survival Systems (RS)
- Sea Scouts ("AUXSCOUT" program) (AS)
- Secretary/Records (SR)
- Vessel Examination (VE)

== Uniforms and insignia ==
=== Uniforms ===
Each auxiliary uniform is identical to a Coast Guard officer's uniform, with the exception that the buttons and stripes on dress jackets and shoulder boards are silver in color, rather than gold. On dress uniforms, appointed staff officers wear insignia with a red "A" and elected officers wear insignia with either a silver or a blue "A", while black "A"s are worn on insignia by both elected and appointed officers on the ODU uniform. Auxiliarists are typically held to similar uniform standards as regular and reserve Coast Guard officers. However, there are certain leniencies in the guidelines. For instance, unlike their regular and reserve counterparts, Auxiliarists are permitted to sport beards.

In scenarios where Auxiliarists are supplementing Coast Guard personnel in an operational setting, such as acting as an interpreter on a cutter at sea, the military-style officer insignia representing an Auxiliary position is typically removed. Instead, the generic BQ insignia is adorned. This adjustment ensures that there's no misconception, especially when interacting with foreign military entities or potential adversaries, that the Auxiliarist holds any command power over the vessel. This ensures that the Auxiliarist maintains his innocence according to the Geneva Conventions.

=== Auxiliary insignia, titles, and military etiquette ===
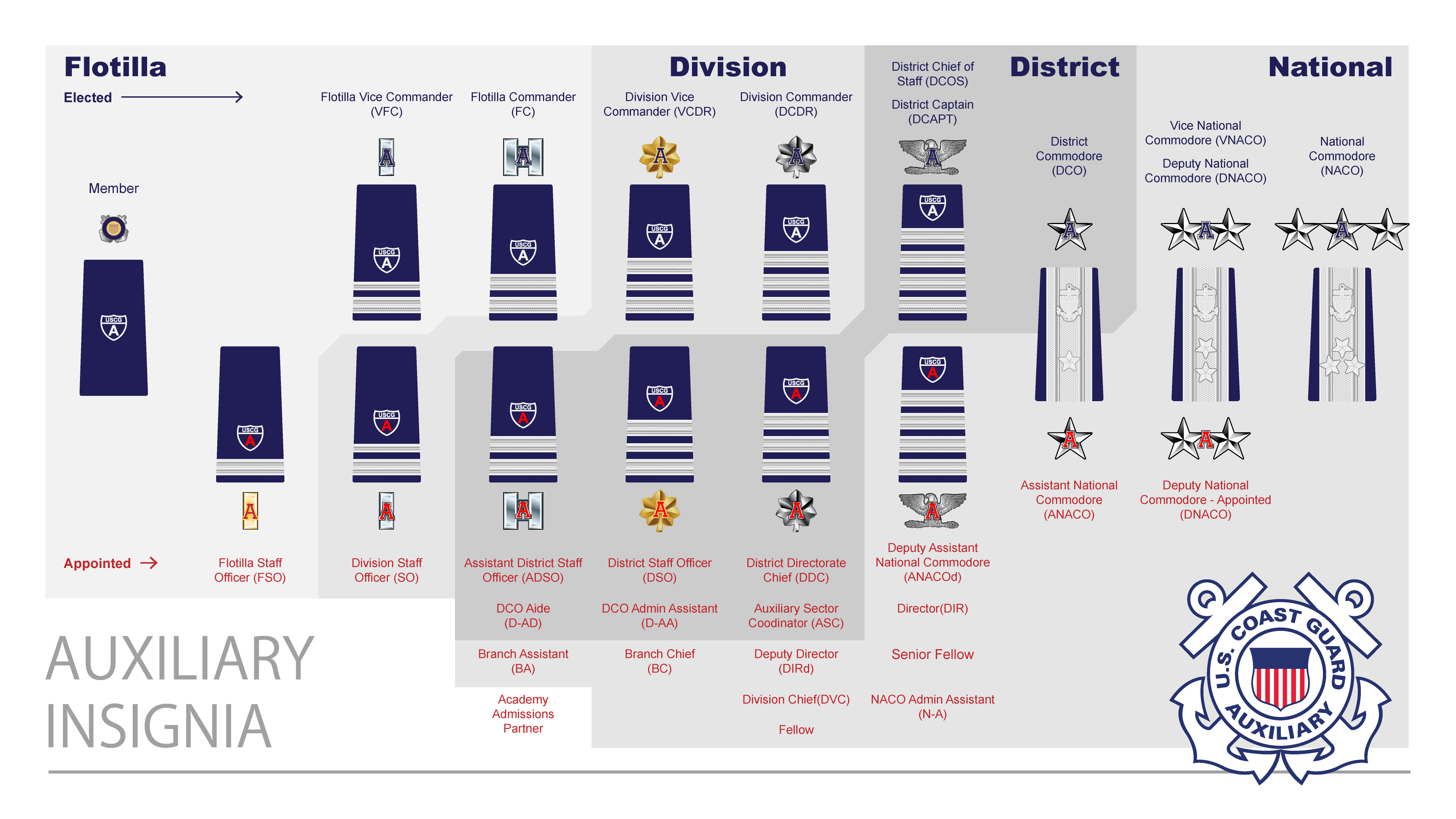
USCG Auxiliary Insignia

Auxiliarists wear military rank-style insignia that signify their leadership position (e.g., a Flotilla Commander wears insignia similar to a USCG lieutenant) but do not hold substantive military ranks and are not typically addressed by their position title. Members of the Coast Guard Auxiliary are typically referred to as "Auxiliarist" (with the abbreviation "AUX"), with the exception of those who occupy or have occupied senior leadership roles equivalent to flag officers (Admirals). These members are addressed as "Commodore" (shortened to "COMO"). Notably, the title associated with the office, such as "Commodore," is placed before the name only for those who are or were Commodores. For instance, "Commodore Lucy Jones" would be the appropriate address for someone who currently holds or once held a position like National Commodore, Deputy National Commodore, Assistant National Commodore, or District Commodore.

For other elected or appointed roles, such as District Chief of Staff, District Captain, and leaders at the division or flotilla levels, the title follows the name. Examples include "Mr. Sam Rosenberg, District Captain," "Ms. Marion Lewis, Division Staff Officer," or "Mr. James Chun, Flotilla Commander."

Auxiliarists typically don't engage in military saluting when interacting with fellow Auxiliarists, though there's no rule against it. However, they are expected to begin salutes and demonstrate other suitable courtesies to military officers who rank higher than the equivalent office insignia that the Auxiliarist wears. Additionally, they are anticipated to uphold correct flag etiquette and similar protocols. While enlisted personnel, Warrant Officers, and Commissioned Officers of the Coast Guard aren't obligated to salute Auxiliarists, they might occasionally do so. In such instances, Auxiliarists should reciprocate by returning the salute.

The rank-style insignia sported by Auxiliarists doesn't denote universal authority in a military sense but rather identifies an individual's position and authority within the Auxiliary. It is also a means of acknowledging the duties associated with elected and appointed leadership positions as well as those of staff officers. If these leaders have served at least half of the term of their designated role, they are allowed to continuously wear the insignia corresponding to the highest office they've held. However, once an Auxiliarist is no longer in the role represented by their insignia, they must adorn a "Past Officer Device" on the right pocket flap of their uniform shirt or service dress jacket to signify their past position.

==== Office title and insignia ====
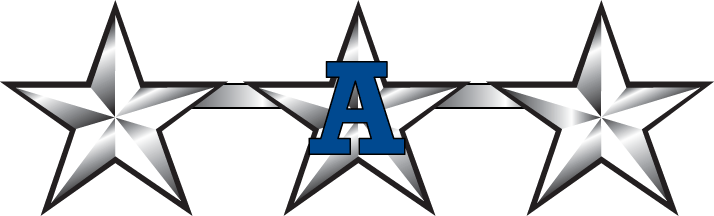
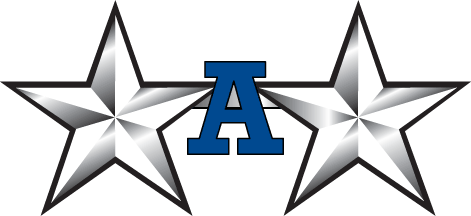
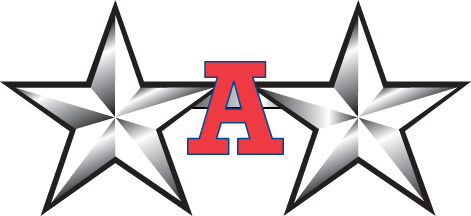
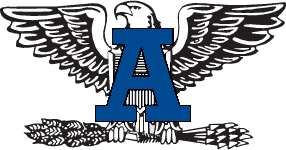
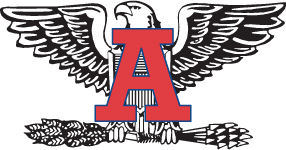
NATO code	OF-10	OF-9	OF-8	OF-7	OF-6	OF-5	OF-4	OF-3	OF-2	OF-1
United States Coast Guard Auxiliary
Elected positions			National Commodore (NACO)	Vice National Commodore (VNACO); Deputy National Commodore (DNACO)	District Commodore (DCO)	District Chief of Staff (DCOS); District Captain (DCAPT)	Division Commander (DCDR)	Division Vice Commander (VCDR)	Flotilla Commander (FC)	Vice Flotilla Commander (VFC)
Appointed positions				Deputy National Commodore (DNACO)	Assistant National Commodore (ANACO)	Deputy Assistant National Commodore (ANACOd); Director (DIR); NACO Admin Assistant (N-A)	District Directorate Chief (DDC); Auxiliary Sector Coordinator (ASC); Deputy Director (DIRd); Division Chief (DVC); NACO Aide (N-D)	District Staff Officer (DSO); DCO Admin Assistant (D-AA); Branch Chief (BC)	Assistant District Staff Officer (ADSO); DCO Aide (D-AD); Branch Assistant (BA); Academy Admissions Partner	Division Staff Officer (SO)	Flotilla Staff Officer (FSO); Detachment Leader (DL)

==== Pledge ====
Auxiliarists ascribe to the following pledge during induction:

I, (your name), solemnly and sincerely pledge myself, to support the United States Coast Guard Auxiliary, and its purposes, to faithfully execute my duties, and to abide by the governing policies, established by the Commandant, of the United States Coast Guard.

=== Medals, awards, and citations ===
Auxiliarists may be awarded medals and decorations of the Coast Guard or Coast Guard Auxiliary, and may wear certain medals and decorations awarded in prior military service based on what is approved in the Auxiliary Manual. There are currently 36 medals and ribbons for which auxiliarists are eligible.

United States Coast Guard awards:

- USCG Aux Distinguished Service Award
- USCG Aux Legion of Merit
- USCG Aux Plaque of Merit
- USCG Aux Meritorious Service Award
- USCG Aux Medal of Operational Merit
- USCG Aux Commendation Medal
- USCG Aux Achievement Medal
- USCG Aux Commandant Letter of Commendation
- USCG Aux Sustained Service Award
- Coast Guard Auxiliary Operational Excellence "E" Ribbon
- USCG Aux Humanitarian Service Award
- USCG Aux Recruiting Service Award
- USCG Aux Specialty Training Ribbon
- USCG Aux Marine Safety Trident Training Ribbon
- USCG Aux Operations Program Ribbon
- USCG Aux Examiner Program Ribbon
- USCG Aux Instructor Program Ribbon
- USCG Aux Public Affairs Ribbon
- USCG Aux Musician Ribbon
- USCG Aux Membership Service Ribbon
- USCG Aux Flotilla Meritorious Achievement Medal
- USCG Aux Vessel Examination and RBS Visitation Program Service Performance Award
- USCG Aux Public Education Service Award
- USCG Aux Operations Service Award

Other awards authorized for wear on the Coast Guard Auxiliary uniform:

- Guardian Medal
- Transportation 9-11 Medal
- Coast Guard Presidential Unit Citation
- DHS Outstanding Unit Award
- Secretary of Transportation Outstanding Unit Award
- Coast Guard Unit Commendation
- Coast Guard Meritorious Unit Commendation
- Meritorious Team Commendation
- Coast Guard Bicentennial Unit Commendation
- Transportation 9-11 Ribbon
- Coast Guard Special Operations Ribbon
- Coast Guard Recruiting Service Ribbon

=== Badges ===
==== Qualification badges ====
Qualification Badges of the United States Coast Guard Auxiliary are sanctioned and distributed by the United States Coast Guard's DIRAUX. These badges are awarded to auxiliarists who attain specific qualifications during their tenure in the United States Coast Guard Auxiliary. While Auxiliarists have the permission to display qualification badges or insignia obtained from their previous military service, they must adhere to the uniform standards set by the Coast Guard. Specifically, only two such badges are permitted on service uniforms, and just one on Operational Dress Uniforms (ODU's). The following are the qualification badges that the Coast Guard bestows upon Auxiliarists:

===== Qualification insignia =====
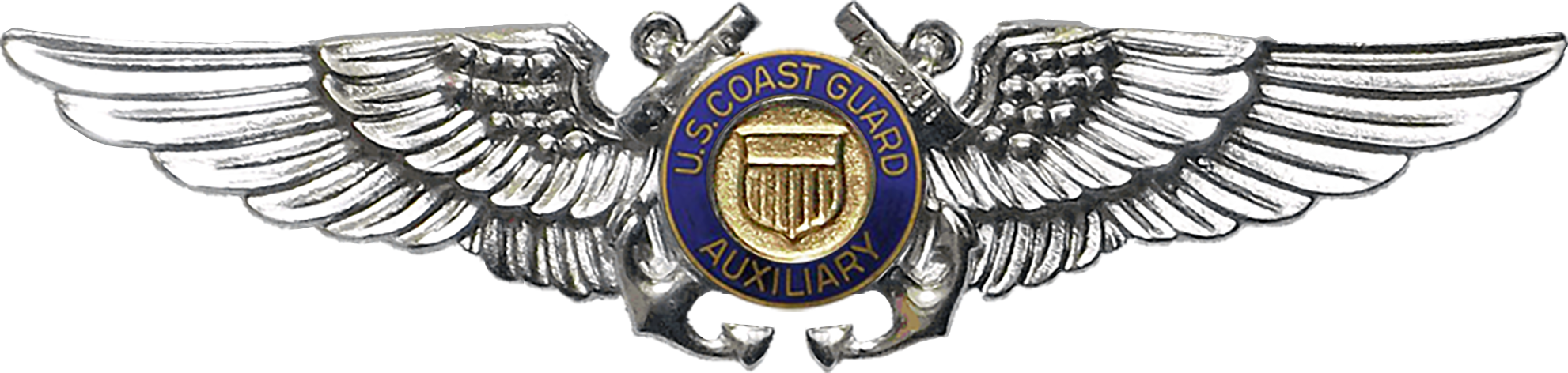
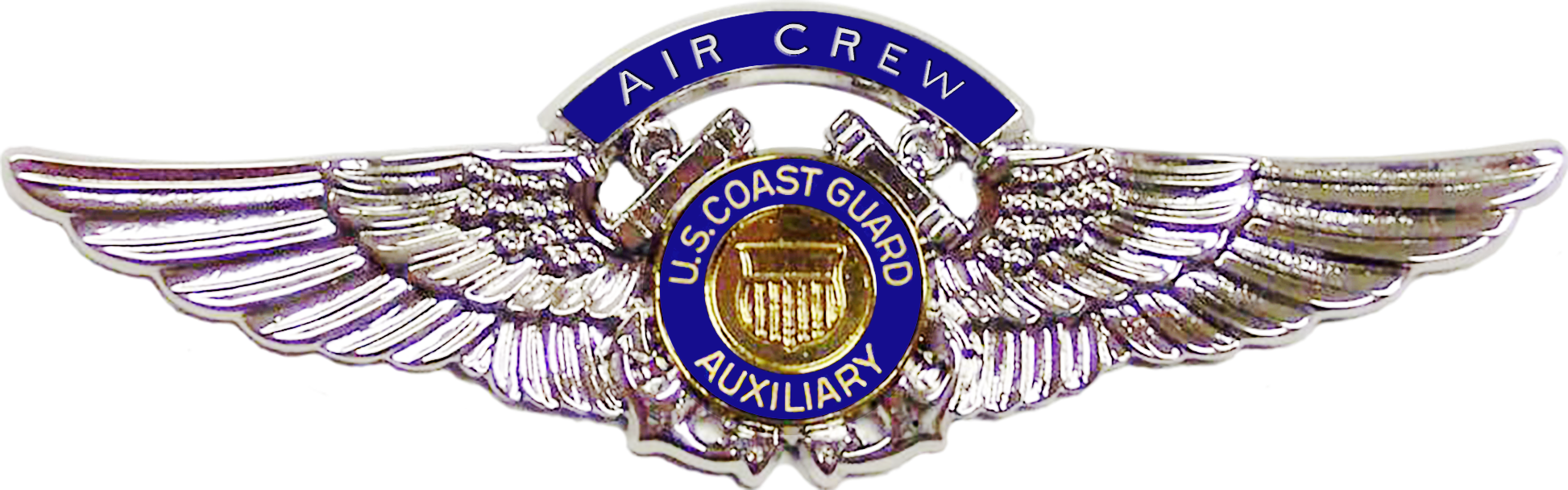
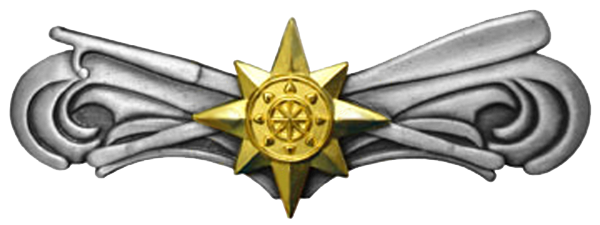
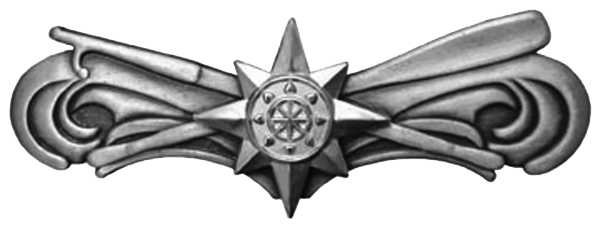
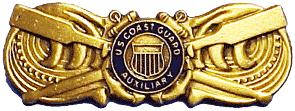
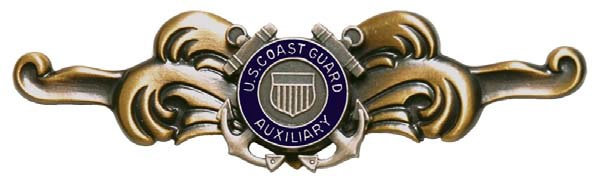
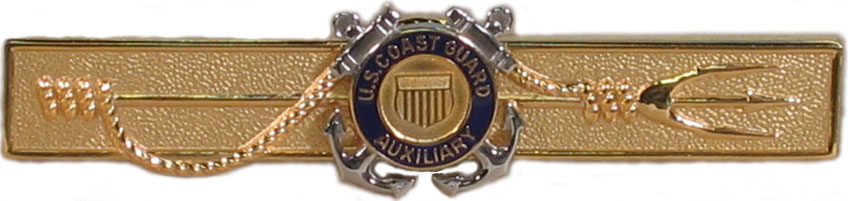
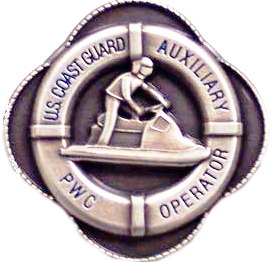
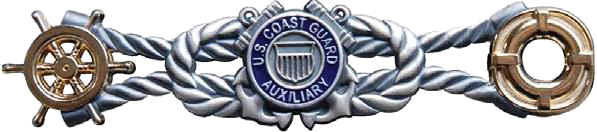
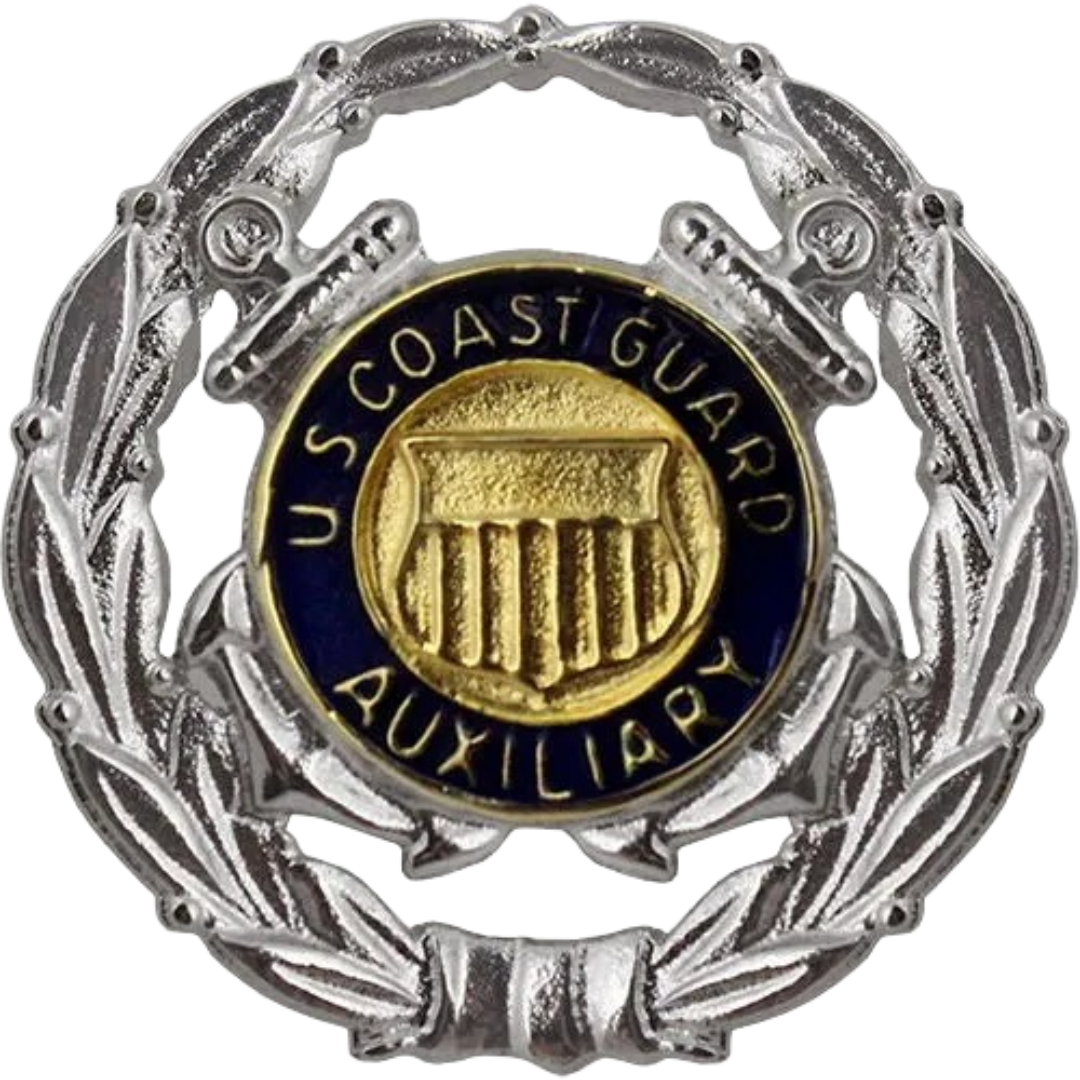
Aviator Badge
Aircrew Badge
Advanced Boat Force Operations Insignia
Boat Force Operations Insignia
Coxswain Insignia
Cutterman Insignia
Marine Safety Insignia ("Trident")
Personal Watercraft Operator
Recreational Boating Safety Insignia
Operational Auxiliarist Device
Culinary Assistance Specialist Device

==== Service identification badges ====
All auxiliarists currently on the National Staff may wear the National Staff Badge. Auxiliarists who volunteer in recruiting offices and satisfy certain requirements may be authorized to wear the Coast Guard Recruiting Badge. Auxiliarists who meet the requirements of the Academy Admissions Partner Program and are approved by the Superintendent of the United States Coast Guard Academy may also be entitled to wear the Coast Guard Academy Admissions Recruiting Badge.

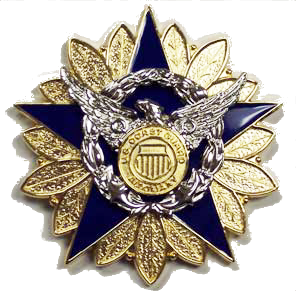
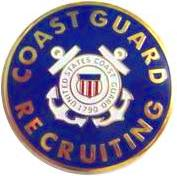
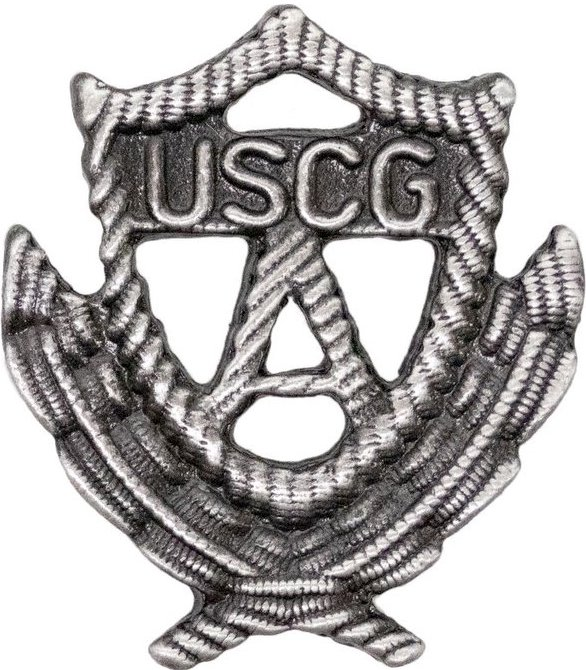
National Staff Identification Badge
Coast Guard Recruiting Badge
U.S. Coast Guard Auxiliary Past Officer Badge

== Benefits ==
The United States Coast Guard Auxiliary offers a number of benefits and fellowship opportunities. Auxiliarists are allowed access to the Coast Guard Exchange and have opportunities for training, awards, and uniforms. Some expenses incurred by the auxiliarist may be tax deductible. Further, the majority of expenses incurred while under orders are reimbursed. Auxiliarists are allowed access to the Coast Guard Mutual Assistance Program. Auxiliary Flotillas are also supported by the Coast Guard Foundation.

If an Auxiliarist is injured or killed in the line of duty while executing official orders, they might be eligible for compensation at a monthly pay rate commensurate with that of a GS-9 on the General Schedule Pay scale.

=== Identification Card ===
Auxiliarists are issued an official identification card from the U.S. Coast Guard by their local Director of Auxiliary (DIRAUX) only after the USCG Security Center completes a Personnel Security Investigation and issues a favorable suitability-for-service determination. The card also serves as an identification that the Auxiliarist falls under the protocols of the Geneva Conventions (specifically the Fourth Geneva Convention).

=== Coast Guard Auxiliary Association ===
Based in St. Louis, Missouri, the Coast Guard Auxiliary Association (CGAuxA) is a 501(c)(3) non-profit organization. Established in 1957, as per its website, the association fundraises and contributes financially to bolster the auxiliary's outreach efforts. It aids the Auxiliary in promoting Recreational Boater Safety, organizing fundraising events, and supplying necessary resources. Additionally, members of the Auxiliary Association can access the services of the Pentagon Federal Credit Union and the Navy Federal Credit Union. The Coast Guard Auxiliary has also established a number of national partnerships for discounts on office supplies, hotels, rental cars, prescriptions, and insurance. The Auxiliary Association is led by a ten-member Board of Directors that receives no compensation. Auxiliarists are automatically extended a free membership to the Auxiliary Association.

== Eligibility for Membership ==
Applicants must be a U.S. citizen, be at least 17 years old, and if they have previously served in the U.S. Armed Forces, they must demonstrate they were discharged under honorable conditions at the very least. Furthermore, they should not have a major misdemeanor or felony on their record and must possess a valid social security number. Sea Scouts may be eligible to join in a limited capacity at age 14, under an exception granted by agreement between both organizations. Although many believe the auxiliary primarily appeals to boat owners and veterans of the armed forces, neither is a prerequisite for joining, and such notions are widespread misconceptions.

== Status level qualifications ==
To be eligible for membership, an individual must submit an application and undergo fingerprinting. As a first step, the prospective member has to complete the new member course and clear the new member examination. Once they pass, they will receive a new member ID number. However, they will be designated as "approval pending" (AP) until their Personnel Security Investigation (PSI) is finalized. As of 1 February 2018, new auxiliarists in AP status are required to clear the Basic Qualification Course II, encompassing seven test modules derived from the Auxiliary Manual, before they can advance to a higher status.

If the PSI yields a positive outcome, the auxiliarist might qualify for the "initially qualified" (IQ) status. However, an unfavorable PSI result will lead to their disenrollment from the Auxiliary. Members holding IQ status cannot attain "basically qualified" (BQ) status until they complete all mandatory training. Once they fulfill these training requirements, they transition to BQ status. Being in BQ status, often seen as "full membership," is typically a prerequisite for holding elected or appointed positions and for seeking qualifications in most fields. From there, the auxiliarist can aim for the "operational auxiliarist" (AX) qualification, which includes coursework in areas like seamanship, meteorology, radio communications, leadership, and so on.

Levels of Status
Abbreviation	Definition
N/A	Initial Applicant
AP	Approval Pending
IQ	Initially Qualified
BQ	Basically Qualified
AX	Operational Auxiliarist

== Training ==
Those Auxiliarists with prior military service typically find a seamless integration into their flotilla, quickly aligning with the current responsibilities and military traditions of the Coast Guard Auxiliary. Any insignia, badges, ribbons, and devices earned during their tenure in the United States Armed Forces can potentially be adorned on the Auxiliary uniform, contingent upon the stipulations laid out in the Auxiliary Manual.

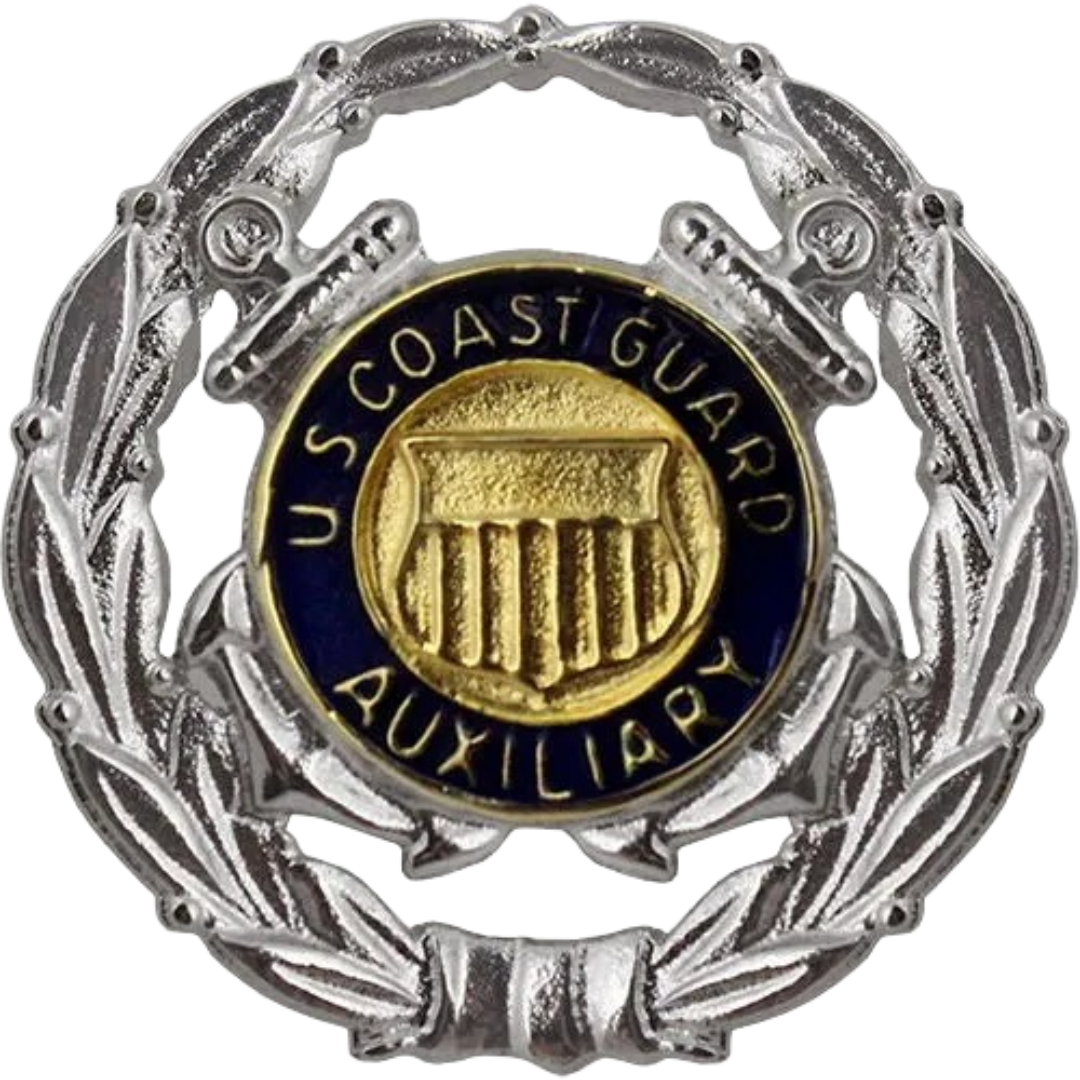
Operational Auxiliarist Device

=== Operational Auxiliarist ===
The "Operational Auxiliarist" (often termed "AUXOP") represents the pinnacle of Auxiliary membership statuses. Achieving this requires members to undergo advanced training in specialized areas that enhance operational proficiency. This program has been in existence since 1952 and was established under leadership of National Commodore Bert Pouncey. The AUXOP designation was established to help the Coast Guard address specific skill gaps and support its operational missions more effectively. To earn the Operational Auxiliarist title, one must accumulate seven credits from a trio of course categories: Core, Leadership, and Electives. Specialty courses in weather, seamanship, and communications are required in the core curriculum that are all good for a credit each. An additional four credits are required under the leadership and elective course types. Once the training program is successfully finished, the Auxiliarist earns the privilege to don the AUXOP Device. Moreover, this advanced AUXOP training enhances the Auxiliarist's capacity and capability to provide more substantial support during the Coast Guard's operational missions.

=== Core training ===
Within their inaugural year of joining the organization, Auxiliarists must undergo six essential training courses. Subsequently, they need to retake these courses every half-decade. These courses encompass topics like Security Fundamentals, Suicide Prevention, Privacy, Prevention of Sexual Harassment & Assault, and Civil Rights Awareness. Furthermore, Auxiliarists are obligated to complete training in influenza and ethics awareness at least once during their tenure, utilizing the Coast Guard Auxiliary Learning Management System.

Failure to complete the mandatory training may make the auxiliarist ineligible to participate in Coast Guard Auxiliary exercises, drills, or response events.

==== Incident Command System training recognized by the Coast Guard Auxiliary ====
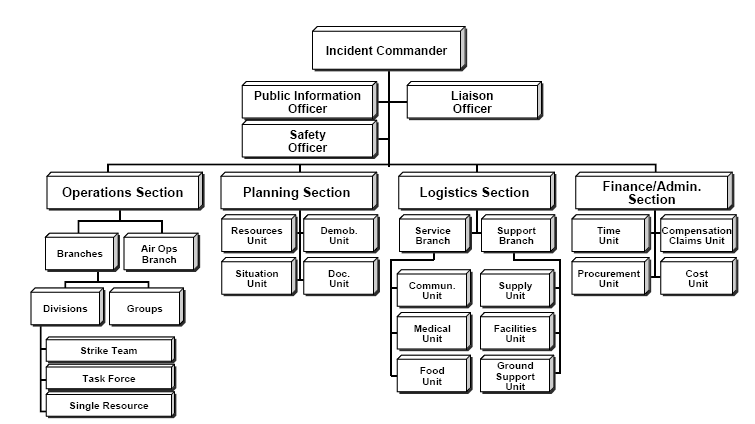
ICS basic organization chart (ICS-100 level depicted)

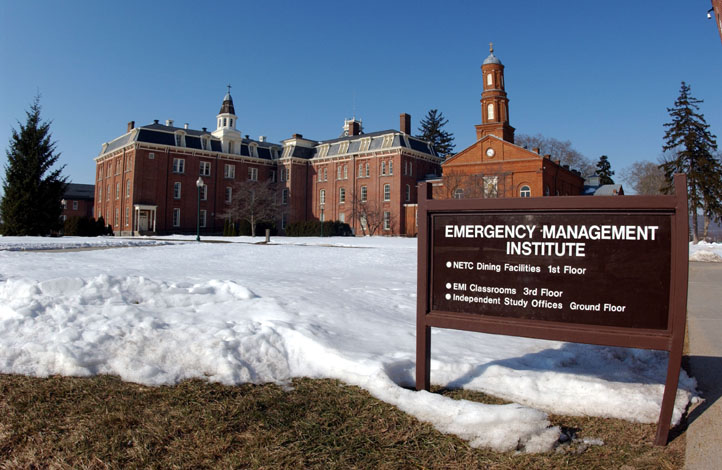
Emergency Management Institute

The Coast Guard Auxiliary requires auxiliarists to take mandatory Incident Command System (ICS) courses. Four of the Incident Command System (ICS) courses are offered through FEMA's Emergency Management Institute (EMI) and another course if offered through the Auxiliary Learning Management System. Auxiliarists are expected to take courses that will help them to understand the Incident Command System's organization, basic terminology and common responsibilities. Auxiliarists are required to acquire the skills necessary to perform in an ICS support role. Officers, certified coxswains, pilots, or those in a leadership role may need to take additional EMI courses pertaining to the National Incident Management System and/or the National Response Framework. As part of ICS Training, all auxiliarists must respond immediately to emergency response alerts and participation in mandatory.

===== FEMA courses =====
- IS-100: Introduction to the Incident Command System
- IS-200: Basic ICS for Single Resources and Initial Response
- IS-700: An Introduction to the National Incident Management System
- IS-800: National Response Framework, an Introduction

Note: IS-100 and IS-700 are part of the Mandatory Training requirement.

=== C-School Training ===
The Coast Guard offers over 15 specialized advanced training courses for auxiliarists through C-Schools. Given the limited slots, gaining a spot in a C-School is a competitive process, targeting those auxiliarists aiming for higher roles of responsibility. To participate in a C-School course, an auxiliarist needs endorsement from their DIRAUX, who will subsequently provide the official orders. While attending a C-School, the Coast Guard typically covers the auxiliarist's lodging and daily expenses. Among the C-School training opportunities are three-tiered leadership programs: AUXLAMS (Leadership and Management), AMLOC (Mid-Level Officer course), and AULOC (Upper-Level Officer course).

=== Center for Homeland Defense and Security Courses ===
Auxiliarists have the opportunity to enroll in self-study courses provided by the Naval Postgraduate School's Center for Homeland Defense and Security. As of 2023, there are over 30 online courses on offer.

== Legal protection ==
When on federal duty, auxiliarists are deemed federal employees in the context of civil liability. This designation shields individual auxiliarists from direct lawsuits in numerous cases related to torts, property, and injuries that stem from their official responsibilities. Furthermore, during wartime, Coast Guard auxiliarists fall under the protocols of the Geneva Conventions (specifically the Fourth Geneva Convention).

=== Employment protection ===
Several states provide limited job protection for auxiliary members who assist in emergency response after a disaster or attend to auxiliary-related duties.

- For instance, in Missouri, auxiliarists employed by the state are granted up to fifteen days of leave annually, with the cap being lifted if they're responding to a state or nationally declared disaster or emergency. Not only are they safeguarded against job termination due to their absence, but they're also ensured against any deduction in pay, loss of regular leave, diminished efficiency ratings, or any other potential disadvantages related to their rights or benefits.
- In Arkansas, auxiliarists working for the state, city, or county governments are granted up to fifteen days of leave each year to respond to emergencies. During this period, they're shielded from any reductions in seniority rights, performance ratings, promotional status, retirement benefits, and life and disability insurance benefits, along with any other employment-related perks. Moreover, these public employees aren't compelled to use their vacation days to account for this absence.
- In New Jersey, auxiliarists employed by the state, city, or county have the right to a leave of absence to attend state or national conventions organized by the Coast Guard Auxiliary. The first five days of this leave are paid. Additionally, their position is assured upon their return.

== Gallery ==
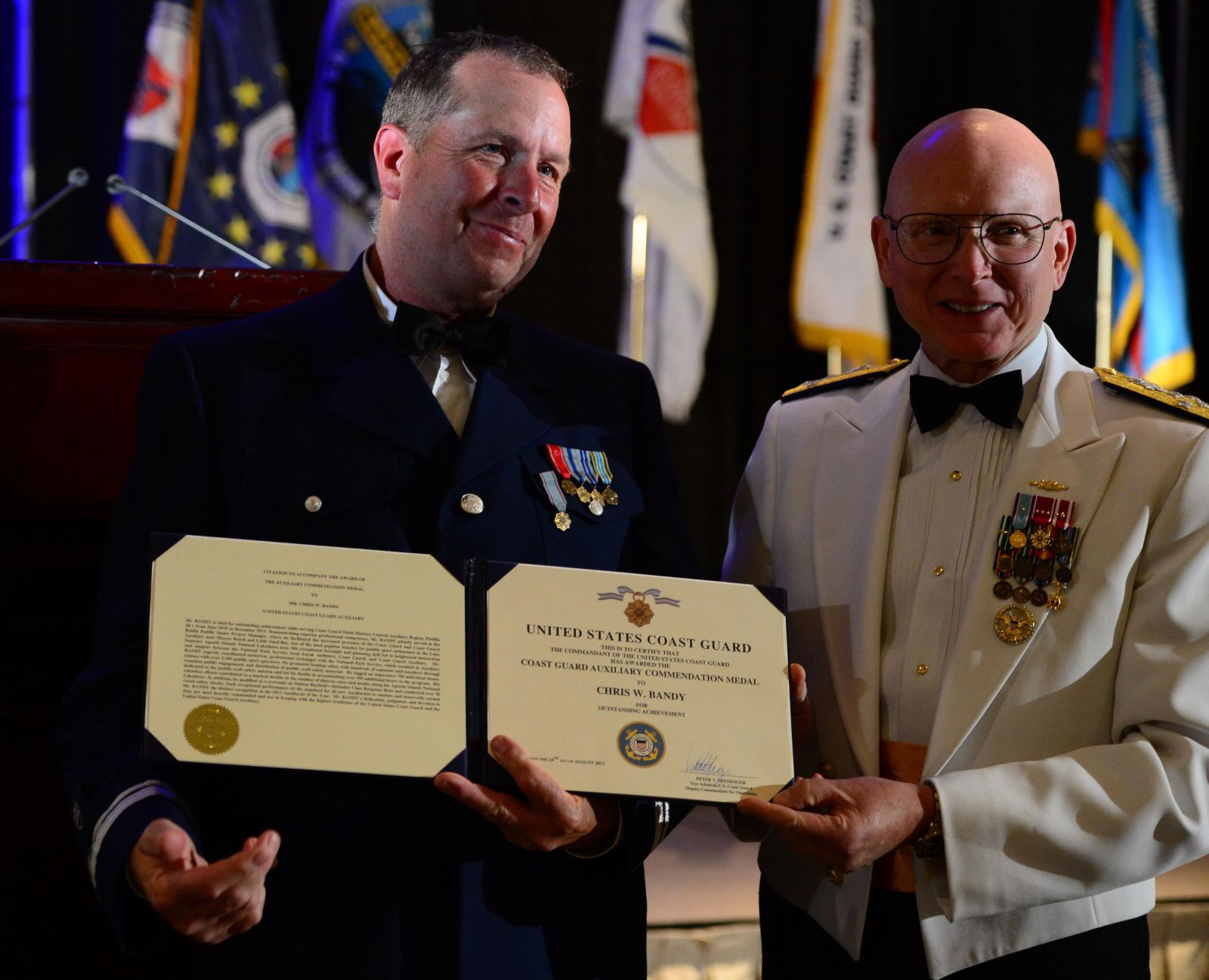
Adm. Robert J. Papp Jr. (right), commandant of the U.S. Coast Guard, presents a Coast Guard auxiliarist with the Coast Guard Auxiliary Commendation Medal in 2013.

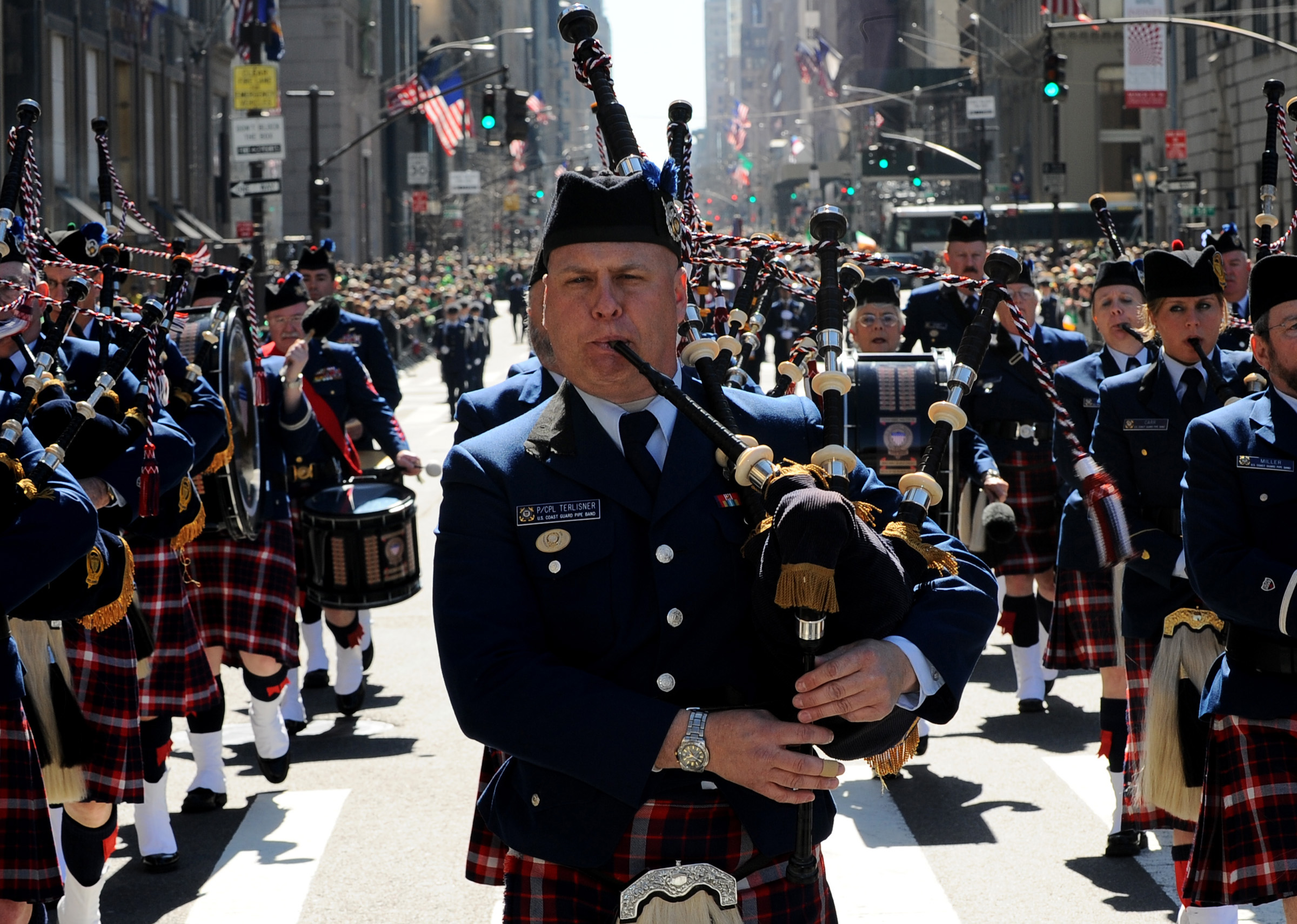
An auxiliarist piper in highland dress uniform performing as part of the Coast Guard Pipe Band. The Coast Guard Pipe Band is composed of active duty, reservists and retired members of the U.S. Coast Guard and members of the U.S Coast Guard Auxiliary.

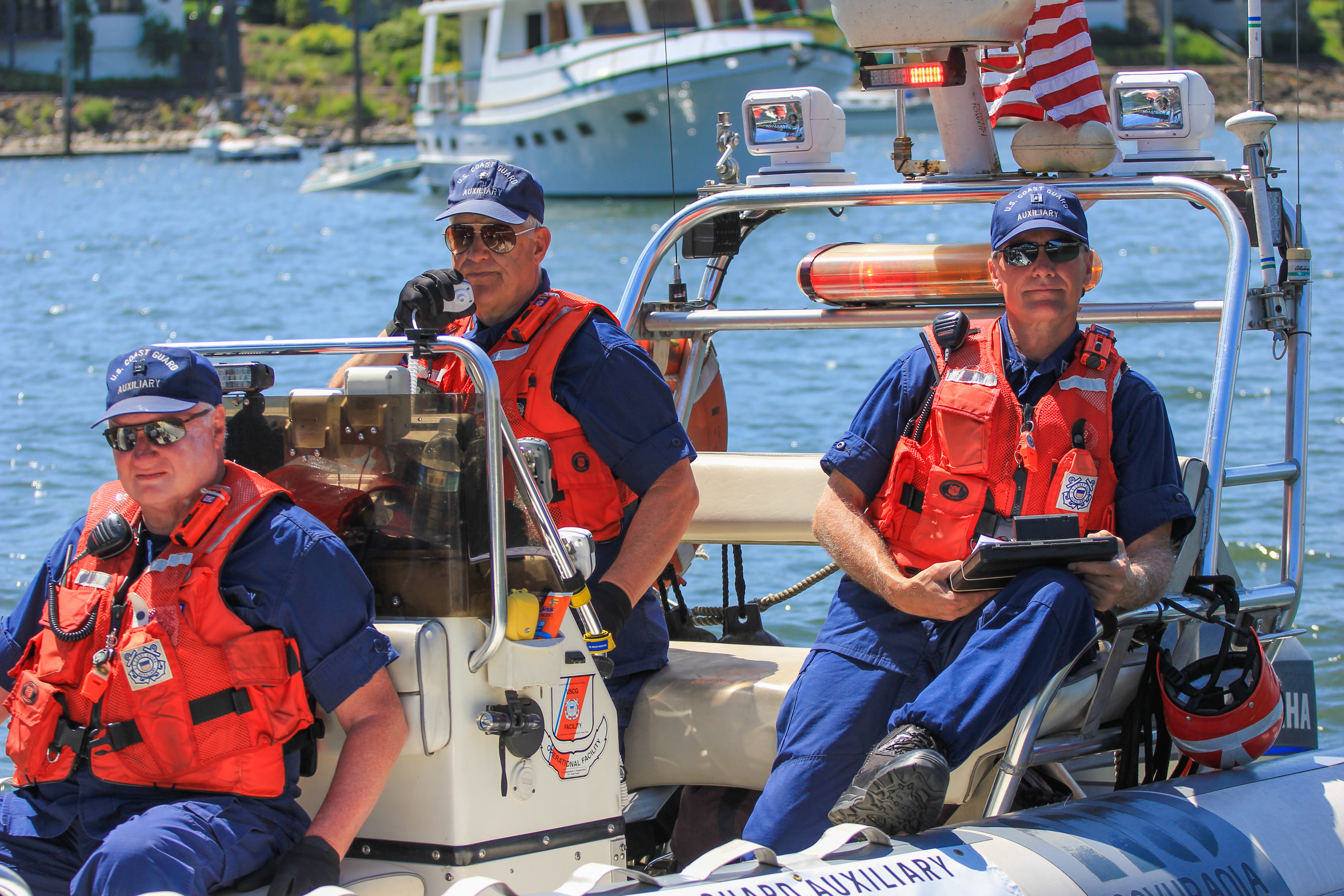
A Coast Guard Auxiliary safety patrol in Portland, Oregon in 2014.

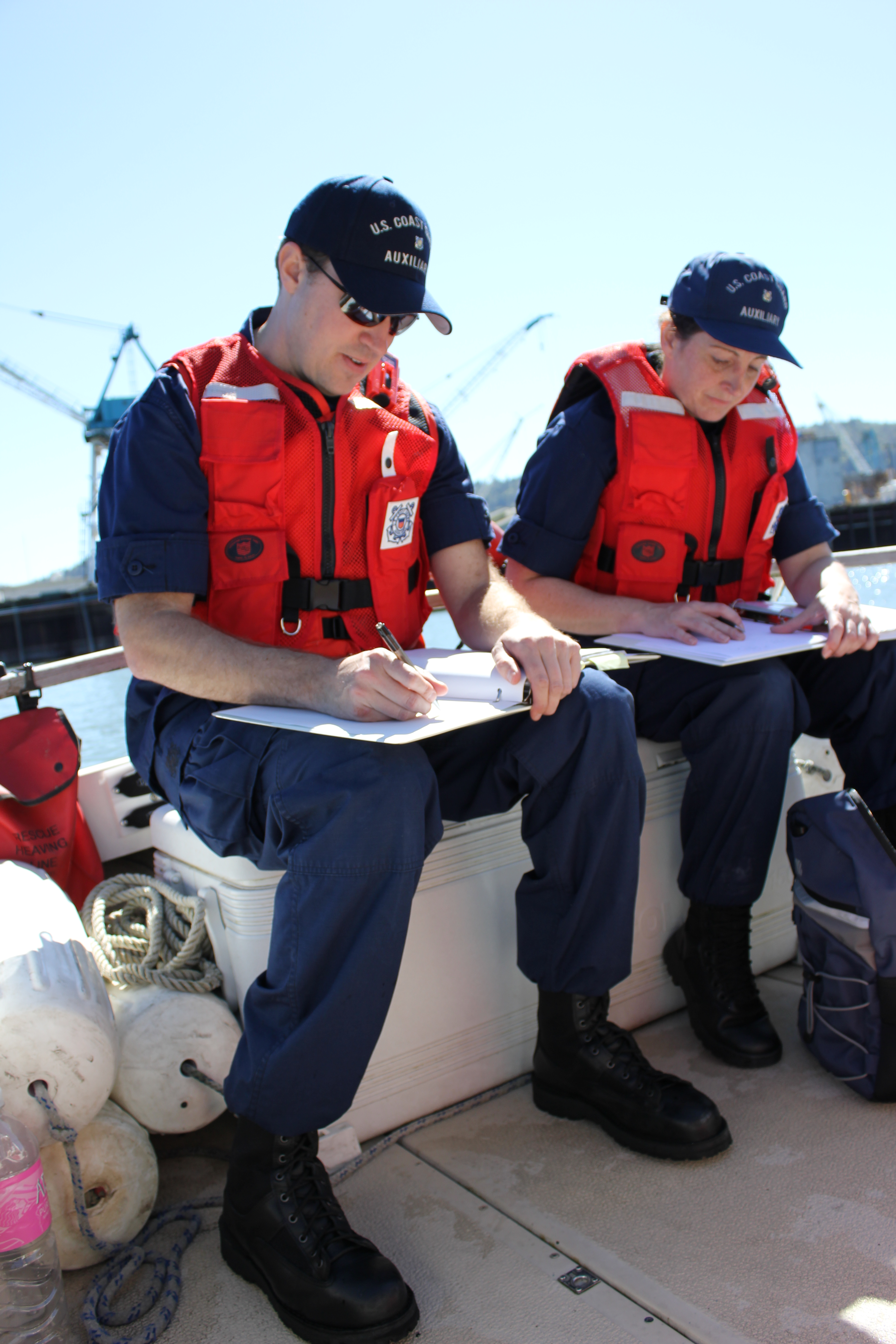
Two Coast Guard auxiliarists review performance qualification workbooks in Portland, Oregon in 2013.

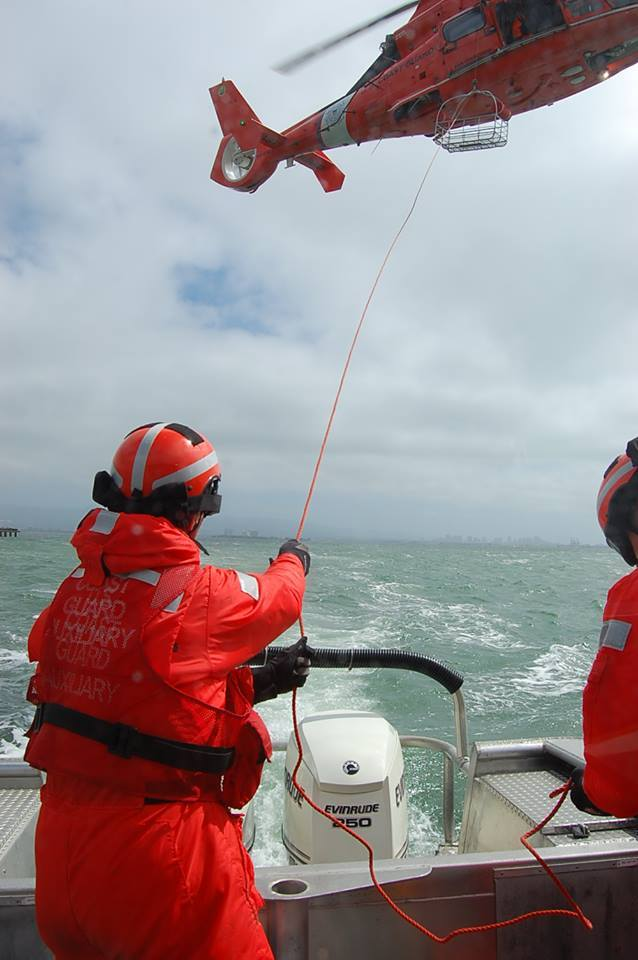
Auxiliary units conducting helo ops on the San Francisco Bay.

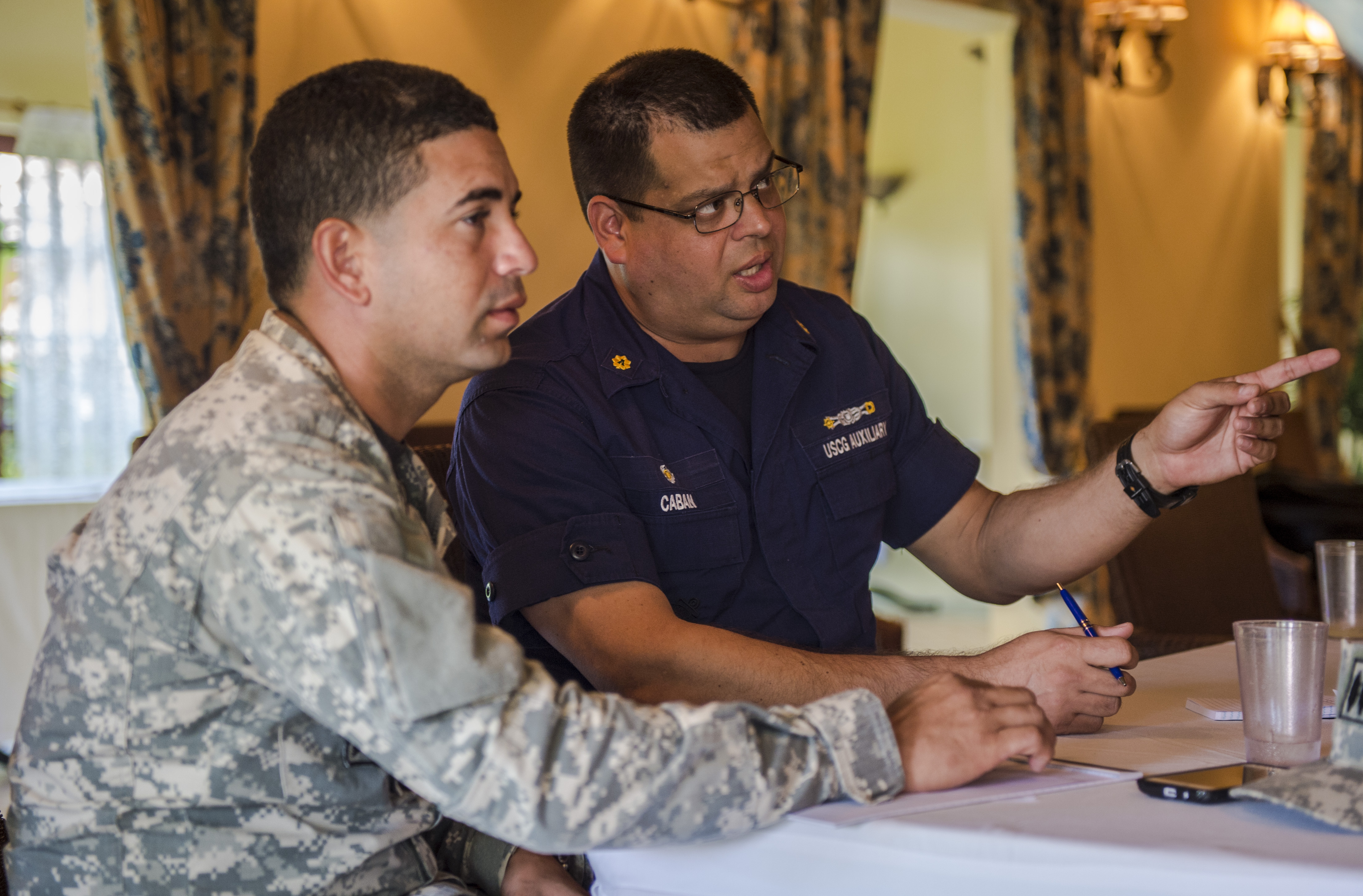
A U.S. Coast Guard auxiliarist (right) provides English-to-Spanish translation for a member of the Dominican Republic coast guard during Tradewinds 2013, a U.S.-led multinational military exercise in the Caribbean basin.

== Honorary Commodores ==
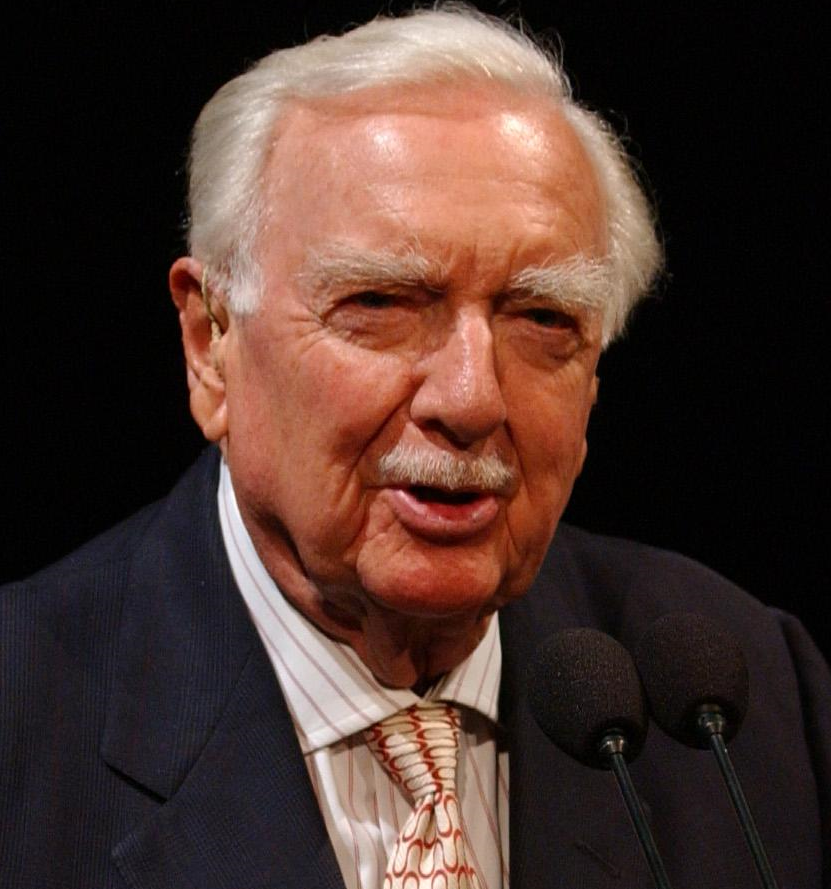
Walter Cronkite

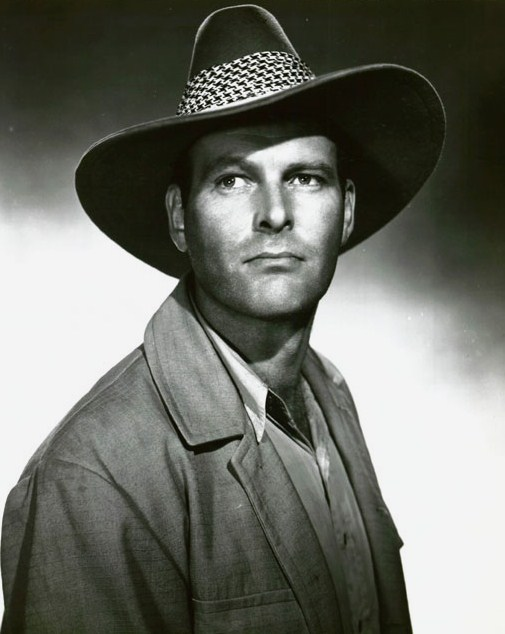
Leif Erickson

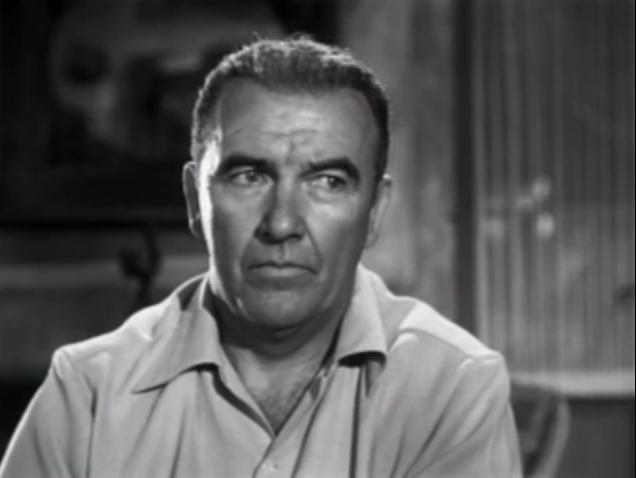
Preston Foster

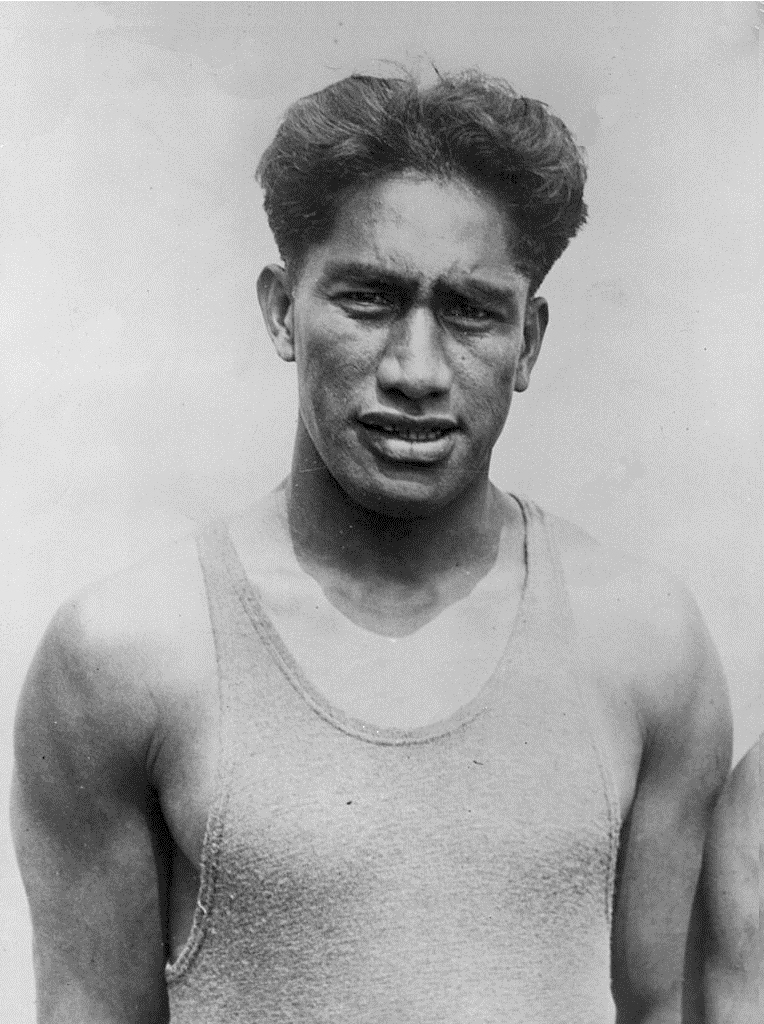
Duke Kahanamoku

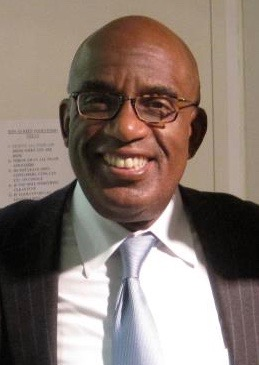
Al Roker

== Notable Auxiliary Members ==
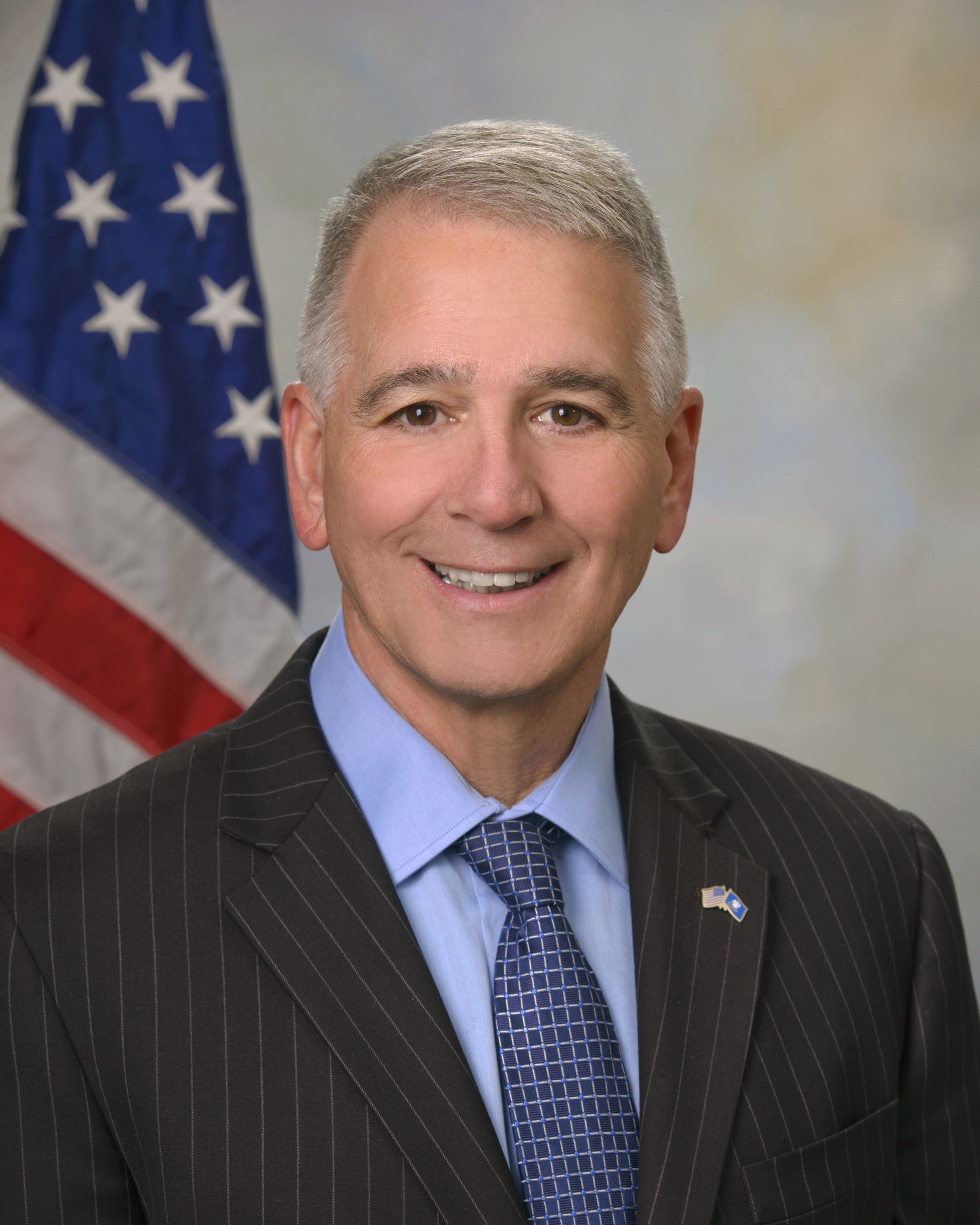
Ralph Abraham

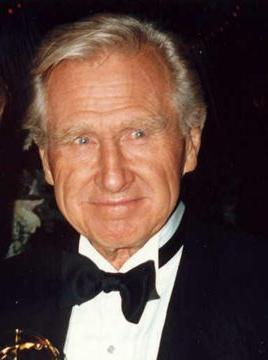
Lloyd Bridges

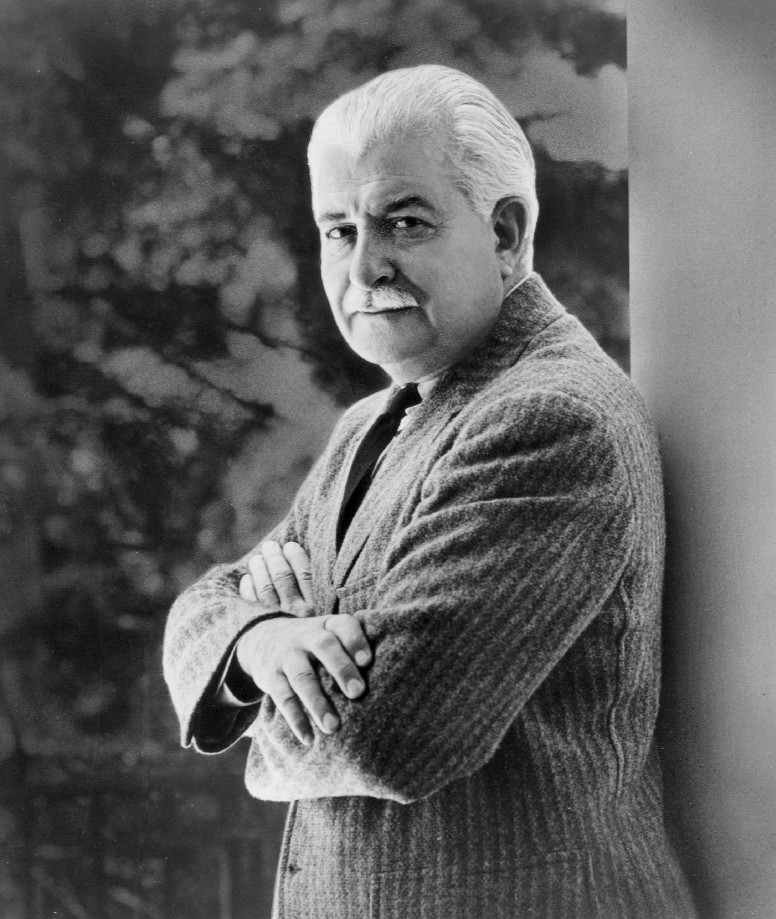
Arthur Fielder

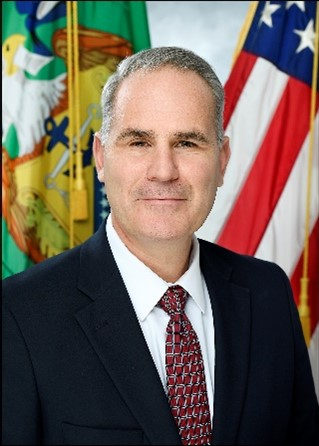
Chris Pilkerton

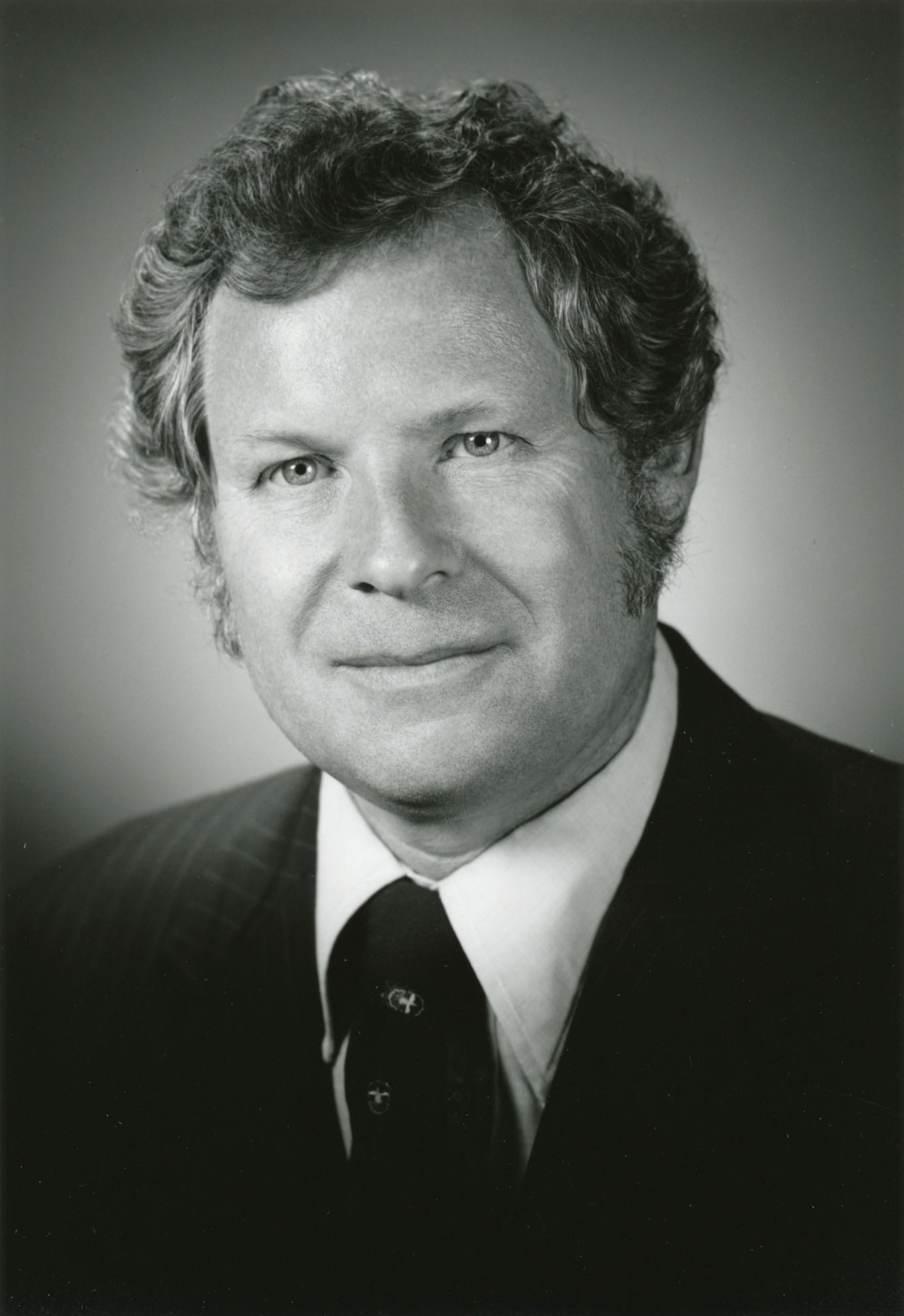
Richard Snelling

Name	Notability
Ralph Abraham	Former member of the United States House of Representatives, Former Principal Deputy Director of the Centers for Disease Control and Prevention
Ryan Bank	American technology executive
Lloyd Bridges	Actor (He was a member of Coast Guard and Coast Guard Auxiliary and did a number of public service announcements for the Coast Guard)
Paul W. Brier	Retire Major General with the United States Marine Corps
Benjamin Bryant	American broadcaster, writer, and Emmy-nominated filmmaker
Tim Burton	American saxophonist for the band The Mighty Mighty Bosstones
Eugene R. Cater	Former member of the Michigan House of Representatives
Walter Cronkite	Newscaster, member of the United States Coast Guard Auxiliary and an honorary commodore
Len Doyle	American actor
Leif Erickson	Actor, Auxiliary and Honorary Commodore for the Coast Guard Auxiliary
Arthur Fiedler	Former conductor of the Boston Pops Orchestra
Preston Foster	Actor and member of the United States Coast Guard Auxiliary and an honorary commodore
Sheila Foster	Actress and member of the United States Coast Guard Auxiliary
Warren C. Gill	Former member of the Oregon Senate
Richard Godfrey	Former Mayor of Normal, Illinois
Frank C. Huston	Chaplain, songwriter, and music publisher
Alan Jepson	Former Mayor of Milford, Connecticut
Duke Kahanamoku	Five-time Olympic medalist in swimming and an honorary commodore
Kent Karosen	Former CEO of the Fisher Center for Alzheimer's Research Foundation and honorary commodore
Robert Kennedy	Mayor of Freeport, New York
Michael Kilian	Notable author and writer
Mary Kirkwood	First female National Commodore of the U.S. Coast Guard Auxiliary (2024-2026)
C. Douglas Kroll	Professor at the College of the Desert and notable author
Abraham J. Multer	Former member of the U.S. House of Representatives
Jack Lord	Actor and an honorary commodore
Jason Morgan	Member of the Michigan House of Representatives
Reuben La Fave	Former member of the Wisconsin State Senate
Andre Marrou	Former member of the Alaska House of Representatives
Lubby Navarro	Former member of the Miami-Dade County Public Schools
Chris Pilkerton	Former Acting Administrator of the U.S. Small Business Administration, current Assistant Secretary of the Treasury for Investment Security
Al Roker	Television personality, Honorary Commodore, Coast Guard Auxiliary
Steve Riggs	Former member of the Kentucky House of Representatives
Sally Snowman	Former keeper of Boston Light
Richard Snelling	Former Governor of Vermont
Bram van der Stok	A World War II fighter pilot and flying ace, and most decorated aviator in Dutch history

=== Line-of-duty deaths ===
Since the inception of the Coast Guard Auxiliary, several Auxiliarists have lost their lives while serving:

Auxiliarist's name	End of watch
Herman Mau	8 July 1984
Madeleine Mau	8 July 1984
Richard Smilgoff	21 January 1989
Linda Smilgoff	21 January 1989
Robert Duffield	18 September 1989
Gerard Rene	18 September 1989
Russell Anderson	12 May 1990
Christopher Polimeni	12 May 1990
Charlene Huhne	12 May 1990
Julie Nappi	12 May 1990
Gilbert Feig	13 January 1992
Frank Lizak	2 June 1997
Frederica Lizak	2 June 1997
Casey Purvis	1 February 2001
Robert Fuller	1 February 2001

== See also ==
- Badges of the United States Coast Guard
- Civil Air Patrol
- Commandant of the Coast Guard
- Incident Command System
- International Search and Rescue Competition
- Naval militia
- North American Safe Boating Campaign
- State defense force
- United States Coast Guard Reserve
- United States Coast Guard
- United States Department of Homeland Security
- United States Power Squadrons
- National Commodore (United States Coast Guard Auxiliary)
- Uniforms of the United States Coast Guard Auxiliary
- History of the United States Coast Guard Auxiliary
- United States Coast Guard Auxiliary University Programs
- Semper Paratus (march)
