= LSAR =

LSAR may refer to:

- lsar, a command-line program for "The Unarchiver" data compression utility
- Laboratory for Social and Anthropological Research (LSAR); see oralman
- Land Search and Rescue (LSAR), search and rescue on land
- Learning Standards of the Augustinian Recollect (LSAR), Saint Rita College (Manila), Philippines
- Logistics Support Analysis Record (LSAR, LSA Record: MIL-STD-1388-2A) for logistics support analysis

== See also ==
- ISAR (disambiguation)
