= Department of Homeland Security Outstanding Unit Award =

US military award

- Presented by: United States Department of Homeland Security
- Status: Currently awarded
- Established: January 11, 2021; 5 years ago
- First award: January 11, 2021

Precedence
- Next (higher): Presidential Unit Citation
- Next (lower): Secretary of Transportation Outstanding Unit Award

DHS Outstanding Unit Award Citation

The DHS Outstanding Unit Award is a US military award and was established on January 11, 2021, by Acting Secretary of Homeland Security Chad Wolf.

== History ==
The Coast Guard received the DHS Outstanding Unit Award for service from August 25, 2017 to November 30, 2020 for performance during multiple hurricanes, the National Emergency Concerning the Southern Border of the United States, the COVID-19 pandemic, the 2018–2019 United States federal government shutdown, the capsizing of the Golden Ray, and the enforcement of International sanctions against North Korea.

=== Eligibility ===
The following personnel are eligible if they served at any time during the award period and did so honorably:

- Coast Guard active duty, reserve, Auxiliary, and civilians
- Other U.S. Uniformed Service members permanently assigned to serve a tour of duty with the Coast Guard
- Personnel assigned temporality to the Coast Guard for one or more of the citied events
- Civilian employees from other agencies assigned to the Coast Guard during this period of time

==== Personnel not eligible ====
The following personnel are not eligible:

- Coast Guard members who had disciplinary action during the award period
- Civilian employees not in compliance with Equal Employment provisions, merit system principles, or DHS conduct standards.
- Federals contractors
