= ISAR =

ISAR or Isar may refer to:

== ISAR ==
- Intergovernmental Working Group of Experts on International Standards of Accounting and Reporting
- International Search and Rescue Competition
- International Society of Arthroplasty Registries
- Institute for the Study of Academic Racism
- Inverse synthetic aperture radar, a technique to generate two-dimensional radar images of a target
- Intelligible semi-automated reasoning, the formal proof language of the Isabelle proof assistant

== Isar ==
- Isar, a German river
  - Isar Nuclear Power Plant, on the river
- Isar, Province of Burgos, a municipality located in Castile and León, Spain
- Isar Rural District, Iran
- Isar, Marvinci, North Macedonia, an archaeological site
- Isar Aerospace, a private German launch vehicle company
- Glas Isar, a small car produced by Hans Glas GmbH

== See also ==
- LSAR
- ISARS
