= My Own America =

Song
- Language: English
- Published: 1940
- Songwriter(s): Frank C. Huston

My Own America is a World War II song for voice and piano written and composed by Frank C. Huston. The song was self-published in 1940 by F.C. Huston in Indianapolis, IN.

The sheet music can be found at the Pritzker Military Museum & Library.
