= Chris Pilkerton =

American lawyer (born 1973)

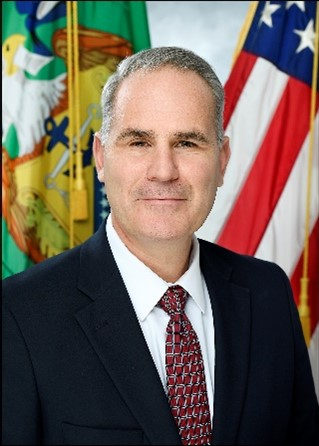

Administrator of the Small Business Administration
- Acting
- In office April 13, 2019 – January 14, 2020
- President: Donald Trump
- Preceded by: Linda McMahon
- Succeeded by: Jovita Carranza

General Counsel of the Small Business Administration
- In office June 2017 – March 2020
- President: Donald Trump
- Preceded by: Melvin Williams

Personal details
- Born: Christopher Michael Pilkerton; July 6, 1973 (age 53)
- Party: Republican
- Spouse: Amanda
- Education: Fairfield University (BA); Catholic University of America (JD); Columbia University (MPA)

Christopher Michael Pilkerton (born July 6, 1973) is an American lawyer and former Acting Administrator of the United States Small Business Administration. He is currently serving Assistant Secretary of the Treasury for Investment Security since January 5, 2026.

== Education ==
Pilkerton earned a Bachelor of Arts from Fairfield University in 1995, Master of Public Administration from Columbia University in 2003, and Juris Doctor from the Columbus School of Law in 1999.

== Career ==
Prior to entering government service, Pilkerton was formerly an assistant director of Law and Public Policy at the Catholic University of America from 2007 to 2011. He then served as a Senior Counselor to the U.S. Securities and Exchange Commission from 2004 to 2006. Pilkerton has also been a compliance director at JPMorgan Chase from 2013 to 2017, an Assistant New York County District Attorney from 1999 to 2004, partner specializing in financial services law at Ruddy Gregory, PLLC from 2006 to 2008, a member of the Nasdaq, Inc. board of directors from 2011 to 2012, and partner specializing in financial services law at Butzel Long from 2008 to 2013. From 2019 to 2020, he served as a member of the Adjunct Faculty for Risk Management and Financial Controls at Catholic University of America and was a member of the United States Coast Guard Auxiliary.

He served as General Counsel and Regulatory Policy Officer of the Small Business Administration from 2017 to 2020 and as Acting Administrator of the agency from 2019 to 2020. From March 2020 to January 2021 he has served as the Executive Director of the Opportunity Now Initiative, a program within the White House Office.

== Personal life ==
He and his wife, Amanda, live with their children in Washington, D.C.

Political offices
| Preceded by Linda McMahon | Administrator of the Small Business Administration; Acting; 2019–2020 | Succeeded by Jovita Carranza |
