= National Commodore (United States Coast Guard Auxiliary) =

National Commodore of the United States Coast Guard Auxiliary
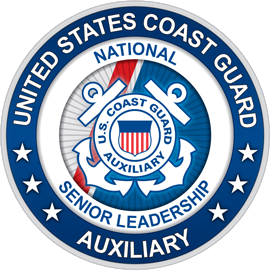

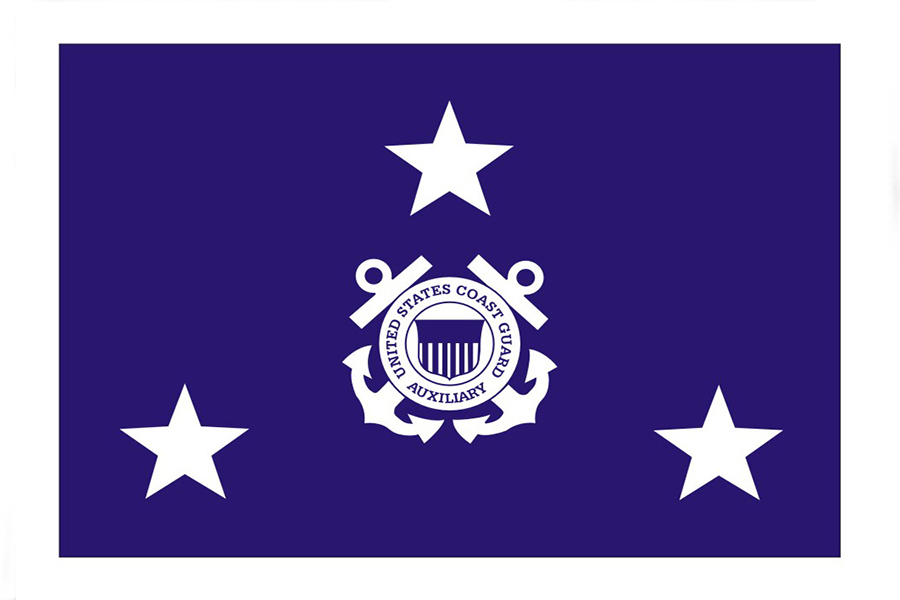
- Incumbent; Patrick Feighery since September 2026
- Formation: 1951
- First holder: Bert C. Pouncey, Jr.
- Website: http://www.cgaux.org/leadership/

The National Commodore (NACO) of the United States Coast Guard Auxiliary is its most senior and principal officer. The national commodore represents the Auxiliary and reports to the commandant of the Coast Guard through the vice commandant of the Coast Guard. Additionally, the national commodore represents the Auxiliary with all Coast Guard flag officers and flag officer equivalent civilians at Coast Guard headquarters on Auxiliary matters. The national commodore functions to support the commandant's strategic goals and objectives and serve auxiliarists.

== Evolution of title ==
The title of national commodore dates to 1951, when Bert C. Pouncey, Jr. was elected as the first NACO at the first National Conference.

== List of National Commodores ==
There have been 38 national commodores of the Coast Guard Auxiliary since the office was enacted in 1951. Patrick Feighery is the current National Commodore.

No.	NACO	Photo	Tenure
1	NACO Bert C. Pouncey, Jr.		1951–1952
2	NACO Alexander S. Bauer		1953–1954
3	NACO J. Webb L. Sheehy		1955
4	NACO John Brent Tanner		1956–1957
5	NACO Charles S. Greanoff		1958–1959
6	NACO Bliss Woodward		1960–1961
7	NACO Homer L. Byers		1962–1963
8	NACO Elsworth A. Weinberg		1964–1965
9	NACO Grover A. Miller, Jr.		1967–1968
10	NACO John B. Stone		1969–1970
11	NACO Harry S. Osbourn		1971–1972
12	NACO Harold B. Haney		1973–1974
13	NACO Anderson A. Cordill		1975–1976
14	NACO J. Kevin Mitchell		1977–1978
15	NACO Dr. Robert L. Horton		1979–1980
16	NACO Aime R. Bernard		1981–1982
17	NACO Martin S. Herz		1983–1984
18	NACO Christopher G. Lagen		1985–1986
19	NACO Will C. "Papa" Harr		1987–1988
20	NACO Henry G. Pratt, III		1989–1990
21	NACO Stanley Y. Kennedy		1991–1992
22	NACO Joseph J. Lanz, Jr.		1993–1994
23	NACO Peter W. Melera		1995–1996
24	NACO Everette L. Tucker, Jr.		1997–2000
25	NACO Viggo C. Bartelsen		2001–2002
26	NACO E.W. Edgerton		2003–2004
27	NACO Gene M. Seibert		2005–2006
28	NACO Steven M. Budar		2007–2008
29	NACO Nicholas Kerigan		2009–2010
30	NACO Jim Vass		2010–2012
31	NACO Thomas C. Mallison		2012–2014
32	NACO Mark Simoni		2014–2016
33	NACO Richard A. Washburn		2016–2018
34	NACO Larry L. King		2018–2020
35	NACO Alex Malewski		2020-2022
36	NACO Agostino (Gus) Formato		2022-2024
37	NACO Mary L. Kirkwood		2024-2026
38	NACO Patrick Feighery		2026-Present

== See also ==
- Commandant of the Coast Guard
- Master Chief Petty Officer of the Coast Guard
