= Richard Godfrey (politician) =

American politician (1933–2025)

Mayor of Normal, Illinois
- In office 1976–1985

Personal details
- Born: June 29, 1933 Streator, Illinois, U.S.
- Died: January 11, 2025 (aged 91) Chicago, Illinois, U.S.
- Education: Illinois State University (BS), (MS)

Richard Godfrey (June 29, 1933 – January 11, 2025) was an American politician and former mayor of Normal, Illinois.

== Political history ==
During Godfrey's time as mayor of Normal he had two economic programs which included convincing Mitsubishi and Chrysler to build a factory in the city and the construction of a new indoor mall. Early into Godfrey's first term, firefighters went on strike for 56 days, the longest in Illinois history. Godfrey traveled to Cuba to meet with Fidel Castro as he was one of seventeen U.S. mayors selected by President Jimmy Carter in his pursuit to open relations with the country.

In his second term in 1984, there was what described as "beer riot" at the town's university, Illinois State University. Students, angered by the Normal City Council, who enacted new ordinances restricting mass gatherings and the sale of beer kegs, marched from campus down to Normal's city hall. Students faced off with police along the way and damage was limited to some broken windows, a destroyed phone booth, and areas littered with trash. Godfrey ordered cleaning crews out at 5 a.m. the following day in order for citizens of the town to see little evidence of what happened.

Godfrey met with five U.S. presidents, including Richard Nixon and Gerald Ford, as well as ambassadors, prime ministers and foreign leaders and was invited to the White House eleven times. In 1984, he was vice chairman for a seminar for public officials on state business and tourism development in Illinois.

== Post-political life ==
The day after the September 11 attacks, Godfrey joined the U.S. Coast Guard Auxiliary at age 67. He served for nine years, became an auxiliary staff officer for public affairs, and received a national award for his public relations program.

== Personal life ==
Godfrey was married to his wife, Mary Jean, for 70 years and lived at Marina City in Chicago. He served on the Marina City condo board in his retirement.
