= United States Coast Guard Auxiliary University Programs =

United States Coast Guard initiative

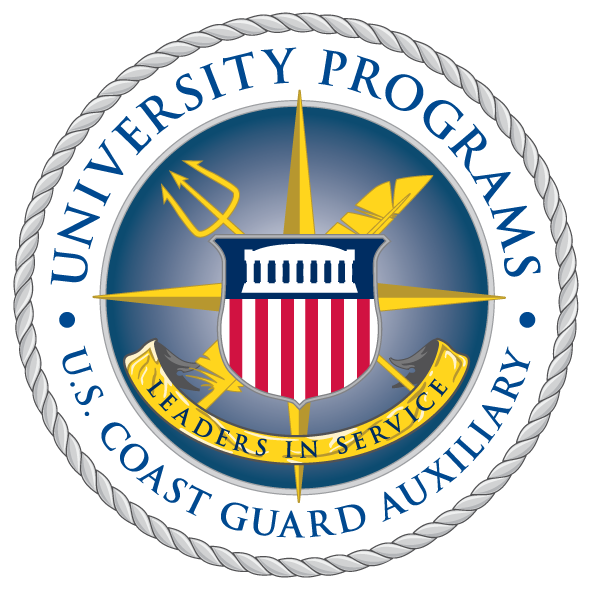
- Motto: Leaders in Service
- Established: 2007
- Students: Approximately 300
- Location: United States
- Colors: White, Red, Blue
- Website: www.cgauxedu.us

The Auxiliary University Programs (AUP) is a United States Coast Guard Auxiliary-managed initiative established in 2007. Today the AUP has around 300 members in 18 units representing over 30 colleges and universities across the United States. The AUP prepares undergraduate and graduate students for future public service inside and outside of the Coast Guard. The AUP provides college students the opportunity to gain boating education, to learn about homeland security, and to gain operational leadership experience. The AUP has a positive track record of getting a large number of its graduates into Coast Guard Officer Candidate School, serving as the substitute for an official Coast Guard ROTC program. Members graduating from the AUP and choosing to enlist are automatically given an advancement to E-3 when joining.

== Overview ==
AUP programs on university campuses are organized as detachments of nearby Auxiliary flotillas. Students complete a "basic auxiliary programs" training curriculum taught by local auxiliarists and older students. To join the AUP a student enrolled in any accredited American college or university has to first be a member of the Coast Guard Auxiliary, and then they are eligible to apply to the AUP. The Academics of the AUP are determined by two categories of progression, Junior Status and Senior Status. All incoming students are put in Junior Status and they must complete all 100 level courses in order to advance to Senior Status in which they complete one specialized 200 level course and one specialized 300 level course in order to finish the academic portion of the AUP. In addition, students must earn six credits worth of qualifications in order to be eligible to be considered an AUP Graduate.

The AUP also allows students to "Graduate with Distinction" which has additional requirements including holding leadership roles within the unit, a white paper on a Coast Guard issue and meeting or exceeding Coast Guard Officer Candidate School physical fitness requirements.

=== Comparison to ROTC ===
Due to the lack of an official Coast Guard ROTC the AUP is often held as a direct comparison, however there are several important distinctions between the AUP and traditional ROTC. The AUP is a voluntary program, students may leave at any time without having any service obligation to the Coast Guard or military as a whole. Due to this voluntary status no scholarships are available on a national level for AUP Students, though some schools offer individual scholarships unique to there institutions. The AUP is also far more diverse in its administration with different schools and units running their units very differently, military schools tend to militarize the AUP treating it for all intents and purposes like a ROTC, while more civilian focused institutions like Florida Institute of Technology tend to treat their units like clubs or civilian training programs. This offers more opportunities for students to be either directly commissioned (DIRCOM) on account of their specific technical and vital degree specialties that are increasingly in demand by the Coast Guard for the future, or go through OCS for other ineligible degrees.

Ultimately while ROTC is a commissioning program in of itself, the AUP's job is to provide a pipeline of well trained candidates for Coast Guard commissioning programs, such as OCS. A student or Cadet who has graduated from the AUP has much better odds of getting selected for a Commission, with special direct commission programs existing for graduates of Senior Military Colleges, State Maritime Academies, or specially trained individuals such as cyber professionals, lawyers or military pilots.

=== Internship program ===
The AUP internship program is an opportunity available to students in Senior Status. Similar to how the Coast Guard Academy has field assignments for its cadets, the internship program serves the same purpose so that students can experience life and professions at various units. The application process requires the member to apply on the AUP Website with a personal statement and all of the required supporting materials. The program is operated by an Internship Program Manager. The program can place students at Coast Guard Headquarters and other operational or mission support units across the United States.

== Additional training opportunities ==
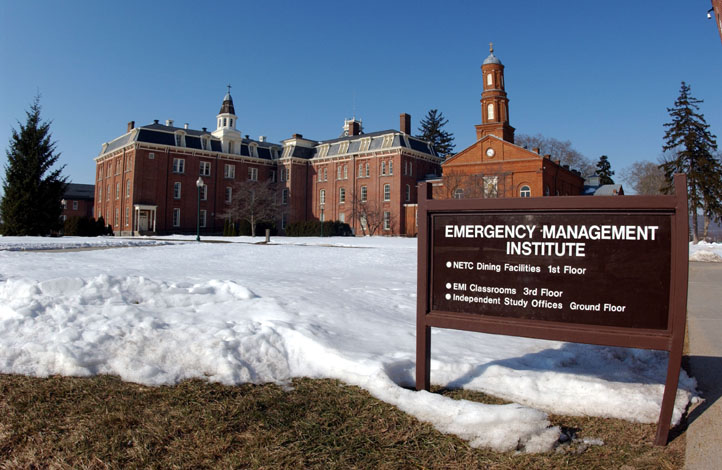
Emergency Management Institute

The Coast Guard Auxiliary provides an opportunity for AUP Member to take Incident Command System (ICS) courses through FEMA's Emergency Management Institute (EMI) and additional training opportunities through the Auxiliary Learning Management System.

=== Center for Homeland Defense and Security Courses ===
Auxiliarists may register and participate in the Naval Postgraduate School Center for Homeland Defense and Security Self Study Courses. As of 2025, over 30 online courses are available.

== AUP Units ==
=== Remote Collaborative Unit (RCU) ===
The Auxiliary University Programs Remote Collaborative Unit was created for students interested in participating in the AUP that do not have a campus presence at their school. Through cooperation with a nearby flotilla, students can further develop operational and leadership skills.

=== Military colleges and academies ===
Graduates of military schools at Senior Military Colleges can apply for both Coast Guard Officer Candidate School and the Coast Guards Direct Commission Select Schools program. Norwich University has the Highest Number of Graduates With Distinction of any campus based AUP .

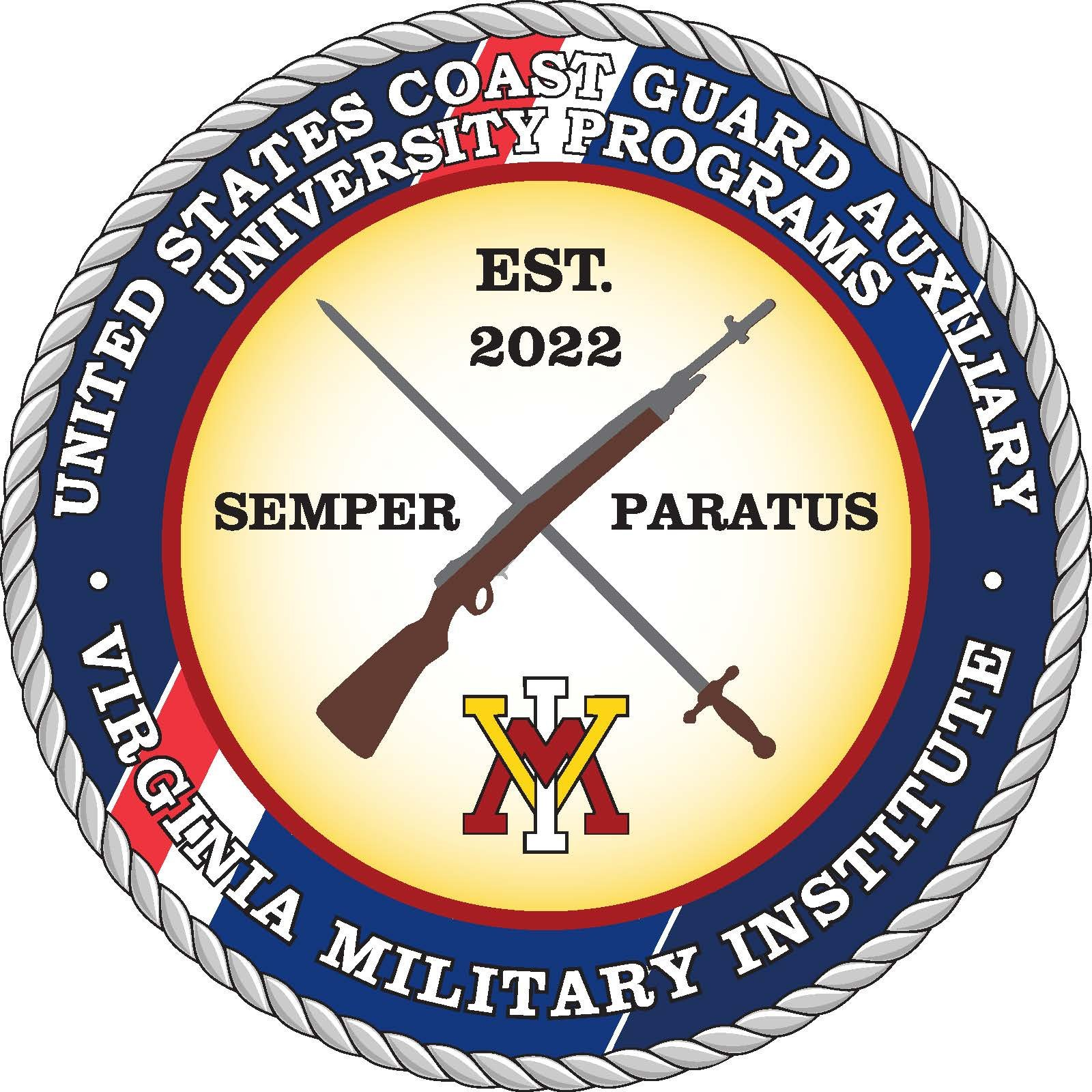
Seal of the AUP unit at the Virginia Military Institute

- United States Merchant Marine Academy
- Norwich University
- Texas A&M University
- Citadel Military College of South Carolina
- University of North Georgia
- Virginia Military Institute
- Virginia Tech

=== State-supported, maritime colleges ===
Graduates of the six state-sponsored maritime academies or the U.S. Merchant Marine Academy may apply for both OCS and a direct commission through the Direct Commission Maritime Graduate (MARGRAD) program.

- California State University Maritime Academy
- Maine Maritime Academy
- Massachusetts Maritime Academy
- State University of New York Maritime College
- Texas A&M Maritime Academy

=== Other colleges ===
- University of North Carolina at Chapel Hill (UNC)
- Elizabeth City State University
- Franciscan University of Steubenville
- Florida Institute of Technology
- University of Michigan

== See also ==
- United States Coast Guard Auxiliary
- United States Coast Guard
- Department of Homeland Security
