= International Search and Rescue Competition =

Coast guard search and rescue contest

The International Search And Rescue Competition (ISAR) is an annual contest for search and rescue teams from the Canadian Coast Guard Auxiliary and United States Coast Guard Auxiliary. They compete for the ISAR trophy. It is an opportunity for members of the Coast Guard Auxiliary from both countries to learn, share ideas, and have fun, while building public awareness about what they do.

Events include:

- search and rescue planning
- on-water search and rescue exercise
- search and rescue pump operation
- marlinspike and seamanship skills
- heaving line throwing
- shipboard damage control
- patching ruptured pipes

The seventh annual International Search and Rescue Competition, will be held in Portsmouth, Virginia in October 2006.
