= Frank C. Huston =

American songwriter (1871–1959)

Frank Claude Huston (September 12, 1871 – October 14, 1959) was an American United States Army chaplain, songwriter, and music publisher. Huston was widely known throughout the nation as an Evangelist and a minister of the Church of Christ and later the Disciples of Christ. He was also a member of the American Society of Composers, Authors, and Publishers.

During World War I, Huston was appointed by Governor Goodrich of Indiana as chaplain of the One Hundred and Fiftieth Field Artillery, Rainbow Division but through a mistake, he was never called upon to join the regiment before the signing of the Armistice. However, he became widely known as the "Singing Chaplain." During World War II, Huston volunteered his services to the Coast Guard Auxiliary.

While in the ministry, Huston established the Frank C. Huston Publishing house in Indiana. His publishing house circulated some of the most popular patriotic songs during World War I. Among the most popular are: "My Indiana Home", "Sing Again those old-time Melodies", "For the Honor of Old Purdue", and "When Our Boys Come Marching Home Again," and "My Own America."

Overall, Frank C. Huston is credited with more than 400 songs. His two best-known hymns, for which he wrote both words and music, are: "It Pays to Serve Jesus," written in 1909, and "The Christ of the Cross," which was copyrighted in 1924.

== Bibliography ==
- Vogel, Frederick G. World War I Songs: A History and Dictionary of Popular American Patriotic Tunes, with Over 300 Complete Lyrics. Jefferson: McFarland & Company, Inc., 1995. ISBN 0-89950-952-5. OCLC 32241433
