= Algonquin-class patrol boat =

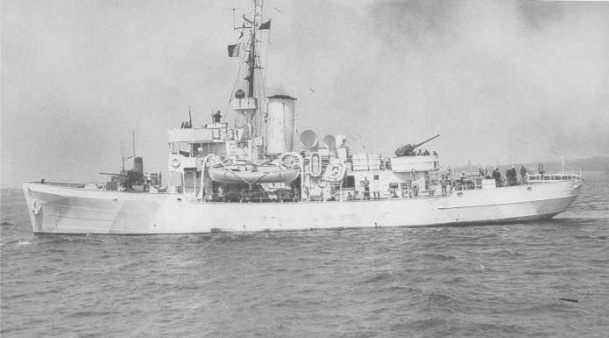
- USCGC Algonquin circa 1943

Class overview
- Name: Algonquin class
- Operators: United States Coast Guard
- Completed: 6
- Lost: 1
- Retired: 5

General characteristics
- Type: Patrol boat
- Notes: Some placed under United States Navy control during World War II

The Algonquin-class patrol boat were a class of cutters built for the United States Coast Guard in the early 1930s. These ships were placed under United States Navy control during World War II.

The cutters in this class were:

- USCGC Algonquin (WPG-75)
- USCGC Comanche (WPG-76)
- USCGC Escanaba (WPG-77)
- USCGC Mohawk (WPG-78)
- USCGC Onondaga (WPG-79)
- USCGC Tahoma (WPG-80)

Escanaba was the lead ship in this class of Coast Guard cutters, but she exploded and sank while serving as part of the Greenland Patrol.
