= USCGC Comanche (WPG-76) =

Coast guard cutter

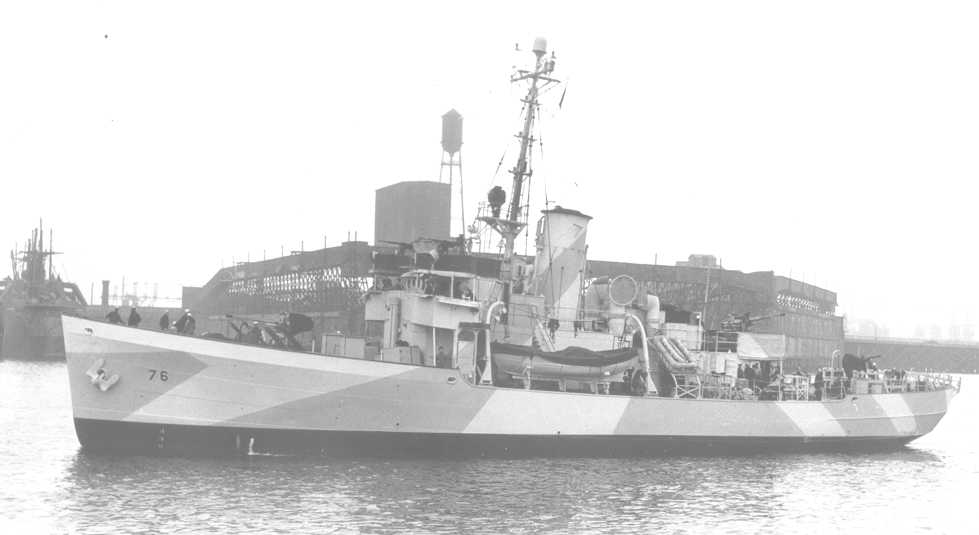
- USCGC Comanche (WPG-76)

History

→ United States
- Name: Comanche
- Namesake: The Comanche Native American tribe
- Builder: Pusey & Jones Corporation, Wilmington, Delaware
- Cost: $525,550
- Laid down: 14 October 1933
- Launched: 6 September 1934
- Commissioned: 1 December 1934
- Decommissioned: 29 July 1947
- Fate: Sold, 10 November 1948, scuttled as an artificial reef 1992

General characteristics
- Displacement: 1,005 tons
- Length: 165 ft (50 m)
- Beam: 36 ft (11 m)
- Draft: 12 ft 3 in (3.73 m) mean
- Propulsion: Main engines: 1 × Westinghouse double-reduction geared turbine; 1,500 shp; Main Boilers: 2 × Foster-Wheeler; 310 psi, 200° superheat; Propellers: 1 × four-bladed
- Speed: Max: 12.8 knots; Cruise: 9.4 knots
- Range: Max speed: 1350 miles; Cruise speed: 5079 miles
- Complement: 6 officers, 56 men (1934)
- Sensors & processing systems: Radar: SF (1945); Sonar: QCL-2 (1945)
- Armament: 1934: 2 × 3 in (76 mm)/50; 2 × 6-pounders; 1942: 2 × 3 in (76 mm)/50; 2 × 20 mm Oerlikon/80 (single mount); 2 × depth charge tracks; 4 × "Y" guns; (carried 14 depth charges total)2 mousetraps.

USCGC Comanche (WPG-76) was a United States Coast Guard cutter built by Pusey & Jones Corporation, Wilmington, Delaware, and launched 6 September 1934. She was commissioned on 1 December 1934. She was used extensively during World War II for convoy operations to Greenland and as a part of the Greenland Patrol.

== Pre-war assignment ==
The cruising cutter Comanche, was the fifth of six "165 foot(A)-class" cutters that were constructed based on a 1915 Tallapoosa/Ossipee design that included provisions for light ice-breaking and the first class that utilized geared turbine engines. Comanche was capable of breaking up to 2 foot of ice because of a reinforced belt at the waterline. Built by Pusey & Jones Corporation of Wilmington, Delaware, Comanche was commissioned on 1 December 1934 and was originally stationed at Stapleton, New York, which remained her homeport until 1940. She carried out the standard missions of the Coast Guard at that time, including law enforcement, search and rescue, and light ice-breaking on the Hudson River.

== World War II ==
Comanche made history in 1940 when she transported the first U.S. consul to Ivigtut, Greenland, on the invitation of the Danish government-in-exile, beginning a close association between Greenland and the Coast Guard during the war. On 1 June 1941 she was assigned to the newly established South Greenland Patrol and was transferred to the Navy on 1 July 1941 where she operated under the control of CINCLANT (DESLANT) [Commander in Chief, Atlantic Fleet, Destroyer Command, Atlantic] and her homeport became Boston. She was used primarily for convoy escort to Greenland waters.

On 27 March 1942 Comanche left Boston escorting Lightship No. 110 to Portland, Maine. There she engaged in anti-submarine exercises and on the 29th got underway with the Frederick Lee, escorting lightship No. 110 and the SS Omaha to Argentia, arriving there 4 April 1942. Next day she was escorting Omaha to Greenland, anchoring at Bluie West One. On the 15th she departed for Ivigtut. She remained there until the 28th when she then transported and assisted a survey party of Army personnel in the preliminary survey and selection of a tank-farm site at Ivigtut, also construction site "C" at Kajartalik. She returned to Bluie West One on 28 April and remained there until 8 May 1942. While there details were arranged for the flight of six PBY's from Argentia to Iceland via Bluie West One, the Comanche taking communication guard of planes in the flight. On 8 May she proceeded to Ivigtut to guard the cryolite mines there, remaining until 20 May 1942.

The rest of May 1942, she was employed in ice-breaking activities in Sondre Stromfjord and then in towing the Raritan from Godthaab to Bluie West One. Arriving on the 28th she met the SS Dorchester in Tungliarfik Fjord and escorted the transport to Bluie West One, arriving there on 3 May 1942. On 6 June, she patrolled Weather Station "A" where she remained until 20 June 1942, being relieved by USCGC Algonquin. From 25 June to 2 July she was on airplane guard at the mouth of Tungliarfik Fjord being relieved by the USS Bear. From 4 to 17 July 1942, she relieved Algonquin on Weather Station "A" and after repairs to her steering gear she returned to Bluie West One.

On 22 July 1942 Captain C. C. von Paulsen, USCG, (Senior Officer Present Afloat, Greenland) and Ensign J. Starr, USCG, came on board Comanche and she proceeded to Julianehaab whence on the 23rd pilots S.T. Sorenson and Julius Carlson came on board to cruise through the inside passage of southern Greenland, taking soundings and making observations of uncharted areas.

From 29 July 1942 to 7 August 1942, Comanche met incoming convoys and relieved their escorts. Then she took on fuel and stores for the Ice Cap Station which was to be established on the east coast of Greenland and on the 13th embarked ten Army enlisted personnel and two civilians and their gear, leaving Ivigtut with the USCGC North Star to escort Dorchester and SS Alcoa Pilot to Bluie East Two, where she arrived on the 17th. Here she took on more supplies for the Ice Cap Station and proceeding to Angmagssalik, three enlisted Army personnel departed while three Army officers came aboard. She departed on the 18th and proceeded down the east coast to an unnamed bay at 65° 03' N x 40° 18' W, which was to be the site of the Ice Cap Station. Arriving on the 18th the bay was named Comanche Bay in honor of the cutter Comanche. Five days were spent unloading supplies and on the 24th she left for Angmagssalik and Bluie East Two to get more supplies for the Ice Cap Station. Returning to Comanche Bay, the cutter took soundings and established two anchorages markers. On 21 September 1942 Comanche completed all operations and left Army personnel and civilians at the station, returning to Bluie East Two. On the 7th she left Bluie East Two, escorting Dorchester to Bluie West One, arriving on the 9th.

From 11 September 1942 to 19 October, Comanche was engaged in local escort duty in Greenland, escorting with other Coast Guard vessels, various merchant vessels and Army transports between the bases that had been established on the west coast of Greenland and meeting incoming convoys. Her duties took her to the east coast of Greenland as far as Denmark Straits on 17 October 1942. On 19 October 1942 she left Kungnat Bay with USCGC Mojave and Algonquin, escorting five freighters to Newfoundland, arriving at Argentia on the 24th. She arrived at St. John's on 3 November 1942, and along with three other escorts left St. John's, escorting five vessels to Greenland. She arrived Bluie West One on 11 November 1942, and on the 13th left Kungnat Bay, escorting eight freighters, two Army transports and Bear to St. John's. On the 19th she proceeded with Algonquin, Bear and USCGC Mohawk to Argentia, arriving on the 20th and leaving same day for Boston where she arrived on 24 November 1942.

On 29 January 1943, Comanche was underway with the USCGC Tampa and USCGC Escanaba, out of St. John's, Newfoundland and Labrador, escorting convoy SG-19, consisting of Dorchester, SS Biscaya, and SS Lutz for Greenland. During the early morning of 3 February 1943 the German submarine U-223 fired five torpedoes at the convoy. One of the first torpedoes struck and exploded against Dorchester, on her starboard side in the machinery spaces. The escort vessels' first indication of trouble came from the convoy at 0102 on that morning, when a white flash was observed to come from Dorchester, just abaft her smokestack. This flash was followed by a clearly visible cloud of black smoke and the sound of an explosion. There followed immediately two blasts from the whistle of Dorchester and lights were seen to flash on in numerous spots on the ship. At 0104 the officer of the deck of Comanche, which was approximately 2500 yards on the port beam of Dorchester, sounded the general alarm and all stations were manned. At 0112, Comanche, in accordance with pre-arranged instructions, commenced maneuvering to intercept and destroy any enemy submarines in the vicinity. At this time all lights left burning on Dorchester went out and it is believed she sank immediately after this at 0120.

At 0226 instructions were received from the escort commander, aboard Tampa, for Comanche to proceed to the scene of the sinking and cooperate with Escanaba in the rescue of survivors. Upon arriving at the scene at 0302 Comanche passed through an oil slick in which numerous red life jacket lights were seen burning, but upon attempting to pick up some of these, it was discovered that the men in the jackets, close aboard, had already perished or had become unconscious and were unable to respond or act in any way. At 0345, forty survivors from a lifeboat were brought aboard Comanche as she screened Escanaba against submarine attack. Altogether Comanche rescued a total of 97 survivors, mostly through utilizing a new rescue technique involving the use of a "retriever." This technique involved having a crewman, dressed in a special suit, jump overboard with a line tied around him. The retriever would then grab hold of a survivor and crewmen on board the cutter would then haul both men on deck. With the survivors suffering from hypothermia and therefore unable to climb aboard a rescuing vessel, the retriever method proved to be the only way to save lives. Three officers and nine enlisted men from Comanche acted as retrievers that night. A contemporary report noted:

Three officers and nine enlisted men from the Coast Guard cutter COMANCHE went over the side of their ship in the icy North Atlantic last February in a desperate attempt to rescue the survivors of a torpedoed U.S. transport. Ninety-three men were saved by the quick action of the volunteers under conditions extremely hostile to rescue operations. The COMANCHE was part of a convoy escort when the transport DORCHESTER was torpedoed at mid-night, 3 February 1943, and went down in less than twenty minutes with a crew of 150 and 850 Army passengers aboard. The Coast Guard craft was about a mile away at the time of the explosion and immediately rushed to the scene, attempting to get the enemy submarine responsible. Instructions were then received by the escort commander to proceed to pick up survivors in the heavy seas. Numerous men were seen floating in their life jackets, but nearly all were dead. The cutter consequently concentrated on life boats and liferafts, the occupants of which apparently were all alive. The cutter hung a cargo net overside, in order that the men afloat on the life boats and rafts could climb aboard. However, it was soon discovered that the men were too weak to make their way up over the side of the ship. Despite a rapidly mounting wind and an increasingly heavy sea, the COMANCHE was so maneuvered as to get alongside every life boat or raft afloat. In each case the cutter's officers and men went over the side with lines, which they used to hoist the survivors aboard the cutter. Every man who had made his way to a life boat or raft observed by the COMANCHE was taken aboard the cutter, which stayed on the scene throughout all the night and into the morning. In reporting the action, Lieut. Commander Ralph R. Curry, commanding officer of the cutter, named the men who had gone overside repeatedly to rescue survivors of the disaster. The three officers were: Lt. Langford Anderson, USCGR, Ensign Robert W. Anderson, USCGR, and Ensign John W. Simmons, USCGR. The enlisted men were: Arthur E. Backer, Jr., Boatswain's Mate, First Class; Harry P. Billos, Electrician's Mate, Second Class; Richard N. Swanson, Store Keeper, Second Class; John P. Harrison, Coxswain; Harold G. Koreta, Seaman, First Class; John N. Gardner, Apprentice Seaman; James R. Gould, Apprentice Seaman; Thomas A. Vitale, Apprentice Seaman; and Charles W. David., Jr., Mess Attendant, First Class."

The Escanaba managed to rescue 132 survivors. The rest of the passengers and crew of Dorchester, four officers, 98 crewmen, and 558 passengers (primarily Army personnel as well as 16 Coast Guardsmen), perished. The sinking gained international attention due to the loss of four U.S. Army chaplains who perished after voluntarily giving up their life jackets to other Dorchester survivors. Their courage, calm attitude, and sacrifice were later recognized by Congress. Comanche and Escanaba landed Dorchester survivors at Bluie West One on 14 February 1943.

Comanche served as local escort during the rest of February and late in March departed for Boston. During the month of April, Comanche was on availability at the Boston Navy Yard. After twenty days of training exercises at Casco Bay Comanche arrived at Argentia with Tampa and Mojave escorting two tugs towing sections of YD-25. She departed Argentia for Boston on 6 May 1943, escorting three tugs to Boston, stopping for three days in Halifax while one of the tugs was repaired. She then arrived at Boston on the 15th. Departing on the 17th for Casco Bay, Comanche on the 19th began escorting two tugs towing two more sections of YD-25 to Argentia, arriving on the 24th. Proceeding to St. John's on the 25th Comanche escorted two vessels as convoy SG-74 with the USCGC Storis and USCGC Active to Greenland on the 27th. She remained at Gronne Dal from 3 to 5 June, while the convoy unloaded and then proceeded to Narsarssuak, returning to Gronne Dal on 8 June 1943. On the 10th she began escorting two vessels to Bluie West Eight, breaking through heavy ice.

She departed Bluie West Eight on 16 June 1943, for Gronne Dal, proceeding with difficulty through the ice, anchoring one day off Godthaab three days at Marrak Point. She escorted two vessels to Narsarassuak on 23 June and anchored with the third at Gronne Dal. Between 24 and 29 June she went to Godthaab bringing back 58 Eskimo dogs and other freight and anchoring at Kungnat Bay on 30 June 1943. On 1 July 1943, Comanche was underway from Gronne Dal with three escorts and a one vessel convoy to St. John's. Comanche proceeded directly to Boston, arriving on 9 July 1943, and remaining there until the 25th, after which she spent five days on training exercises in Casco Bay, returning to Boston on 30 July 1943.

Leaving Boston on 1 August 1943, Comanche arrived at St. John's on the 7th and was underway on the 12th screening convoy SG-29 to Kungnat Bay which was reached on the 22nd. On the 24th she was escorting convoy GS-27 to Placentia Harbour, Newfoundland, arriving on the 30th. On 31 August she was again underway escorting a convoy to Sydney, Nova Scotia, and thence to St. John's. After an inspection on 8 September 1943, she began escorting convoy SG-30 with four other escorts to Greenland. En route she depth-charged a sound contact on the 11th, anchoring in Kungnat Bay the same day before proceeding to Gronne Dal. On the 15th, still escorting one section of convoy SG-30, she departed Gronne Dal and reached Ikateq on the 18th. On the 21st she searched Angmagssalik Fjord for a lost ship's motor boat which returned safely later the same day. Another missing motor boat was searched for on the 25th and was picked up by the Bluebird outside Angmagssalik entrance. Comanche remained in Angmagssalik Fjord until 18 October 1943. She then proceeded to Kungnat Bay, escorting three vessels in company with the Northland. On local escort duty until 25 October 1943, Comanche began escorting the 16 ship convoy GS-34 with seven other escorts on that date. Diverted three times by reported submarine action on their charted route, the convoy was sent to Cape Race. On 1 November she departed Argentia as escort for a convoy to Boston. On 14 November she proceeded to screen the USAT Nevada, which had slowed down with engine trouble. She moored at Boston on 5 November 1943, for availability until 27 November 1943.

Departing Boston for Argentia on 27 November, she proceeded at best speed to overtake the USCGC Modoc and USS Kaweah, taking position as escort on the 28th, as Modoc dropped hack with boiler trouble. Arriving Argentia on 1 December 1943, she departed on the 6th escorting a British tanker to St. John's where she remained until the 13th. Then she proceeded with Modoc and Tampa to escort the USAT Fairfax as convoy SG-37 sailed to Greenland. On 15 December she detached to investigate a distress message from Nevada in position 56° 35' N x 49° 10' W to which position Comanche proceeded at full speed. At 2100 Nevada was sighted through snow squalls, a darkened ship lying low in the water, apparently abandoned. The boat falls were hanging empty and no personnel could be seen aboard. Half an hour later a red flare was sighted and proved to be a lifeboat crowded with 29 men and a dog and they were taken aboard. Unfortunately three of these men were lost when they attempted to jump to Comanche's deck and although the crew made a heroic efforts to save them, none of the three were recovered. The area was then box-searched for other survivors until the 19th, the Comanche being joined in the search by the cutters Storis, Modoc and Tampa. The Nevada sank on the 16th and Comanche reached Bluie West One on the 21st, delivering Fairfax and landing the 29 survivors of Nevada, proceeding to Gronne Dal on 24 December 1943.

Departing Gronne Del on 25 December 1943, Comanche with three other escorts began screening convoy GS-39 which moored at St. John's on 1 January 1944. On the 3rd she departed for Boston with three other escorts and the convoyed YD-2, arriving on the 7th. Proceeding then to Casco Bay on the 23rd she remained there through the 29th undergoing intensive drills, returning to Boston until 1 February. On that day she departed with two other escorts for Fairfax reaching Argentia on the 4th and remaining there until the 9th. Then she departed for Halifax escorting SS Pollaland and returned to Argentia on the 13th, departing for St. John's on the 15th. On the 16th she was en route Greenland escorting, with the Northland, the SS Julius Thomsen, to Greenland. She anchored in Kungnat Bay on the 22nd after dropping a nine-charge pattern on a sound contact, bringing up an oil slick and air bubbles, although a search of enemy records after the war did not show any U-boat losses in this area at this time. Proceeding then to Gronne Dal, she remained there until 3 March 1944.

During the remainder of March, Comanche broke ice Skov Fjord and engaged in local escort work. On the 14th she departed Gronne Dal to establish Weather Station 'Able' where she remained until relieved by Active on the 24th. Returning to Gronne Dal she remained moored there and at Narsarssauk until 22 April 1944, when she departed with Mohawk, escorting the SS Laramie to Boston. Encountering impassable ice she returned to Gronne Dal again, departing on 24 April for Boston. Comanche arrived Boston 2 May 1944, for a 20-day availability, after which she proceeded to Argentia arriving on the 29th and at Gronne Dal on 3 June 1944. She spent the balance of 1944 on weather patrol on Weather Station 'Charlie' returning to Boston on 6 August 1944, for generator repairs. On returning to Greenland in September 1944, she acted as escort for convoy SG-52. Again assuming weather patrol duties on Station 'Charlie' during October, November and December except when she went to the assistance, on 23 October 1944, of the German prize Externsteine, which had been captured by USCGC Eastwind and USCGC Southwind, and acted as screen on 26 October 1944, for Storis, which was towing the disabled Northland. On 8 November she searched for the schooner Effie Morrison without results and also on the 13th for a lost plane, again without results. Comanche was on weather patrol on station 'Able' as 1944 closed.

Comanche continued on weather patrol, patrolling Station No. 6, during January and February 1945, relieved by Algonquin and USCGC Tahoma. In March 1945, she returned to the United States and after 30 days availability and ten days of training exercises at Casco Bay, arrived at Argentia on 29 May 1945. Here she was assigned to International Ice Patrol duty until 4 June 1945, when the assignment was cancelled. Proceeding to NOB, Iceland on 20 June 1945, she was assigned to Air-Sea Rescue Station at 62° 45' N x 29° 00' W on 14 July 1945, returning to Iceland on 20 July 1945. She maintained the station again from 1 to 7 August and again from 16 to 23 August, during which patrol the war ended, and finally from 25 to 28 August 1945. From 9 September 1945 she was on four-hour standby air-sea rescue duty at Reykjavík for the rest of the month. Comanche then prepared for a return to her peacetime duties.

== Post-war career ==
After her war-time armament was removed, Comanche was transferred to her new homeport of Norfolk, Virginia. During the post-war demobilization mania and the consequent reduction in the number of personnel kept on active duty, there were not enough Coast Guardsmen to man every cutter in the fleet. The Coast Guard then began to determine which cutters would remain operational and which would be placed in reserve status or decommissioned altogether. On 23 April 1946, Comanche was ordered to be placed "in commission, in reserve" status, with a reduced crew. She was activated for duty for six days in February 1947, during the ice season, but was then prepared for permanent decommissioning.

Comanche was decommissioned on 29 July 1947 and placed in storage at the Coast Guard Yard in Curtis Bay, Maryland. She was then declared as "surplus to the needs of the Coast Guard" on 13 July 1948 and sold on 10 November 1948 to the Virginia Pilots Association.

In 1984 the cutter was donated by the Virginia Pilot's Association to the Patriot's Point Development Authority/Museum, where she was used mostly as a barracks boat. The ship was badly damaged in Hurricane Hugo in Sept 1989 by banging up against sister museum ship USS Yorktown. In 1989 the museum was discussing the disposal of the cutter, but in 1991, when Patriot's Point was taken over by the State of South Carolina, the ship was still listed among its assets. She was later donated to the South Carolina Department of Natural Resources and sunk as to form Comanche Reef 12 miles out of Charleston in 1992.

== USCGC Charles David ==
The Sentinel class cutters are all to be named after heroic Coast Guardsmen. Charles Walter David Jr. one of the heroic Comanche crewmen who dived into the freezing North Atlantic to rescue crew and passengers of the Dorchester, is the namesake of the seventh Sentinel class cutter.

== Notes ==
Citations

References cited

- "Comanche, 1934" (asp). Cutters, Craft & U.S. Coast Guard-Manned Army & Navy Vessels. U.S. coast Guard Historian's Office.
- "Patriots Point Receives Former Coast Guard Cutter" (PDF). Newsletter, Volume 10, No. 2, Fall 1984. North American Society for Oceanic History, Inc. website. Archived from the original (PDF) on 5 March 2012.
- "Patriots' Point Naval and Maritime Museum". Bill 50, 109th Session, 1991–1992. General Assembly of the State of South Carolina.
- Braesch, LT Connie (27 October 2010). "Coast Guard Heroes". Coast Guard Compass. U.S. Coast Guard. Archived from the original on 27 November 2012.
- Braesch, LT Connie (3 November 2010). "Coast Guard Heroes: Charles Walter David Jr". Coast Guard Compass. U.S. Coast Guard. Archived from the original on 13 November 2013.
- Buxton, Geordie and Ed Macy (2005). Haunted Harbor: Charleston's Maritime Ghosts and the Unexplained. Gloucestershire, UK: The History Press. ISBN 978-1596290747.
- Scheina, Robert L. (1982). U.S. Coast Guard Cutters & Craft of World War II. Naval Institute Press, Annapolis, Maryland. ISBN 978-0-87021-717-3.

This article incorporates public domain material from websites or documents of the United States Coast Guard.
