= Greenland Patrol =

United States Coast Guard operation in World War II

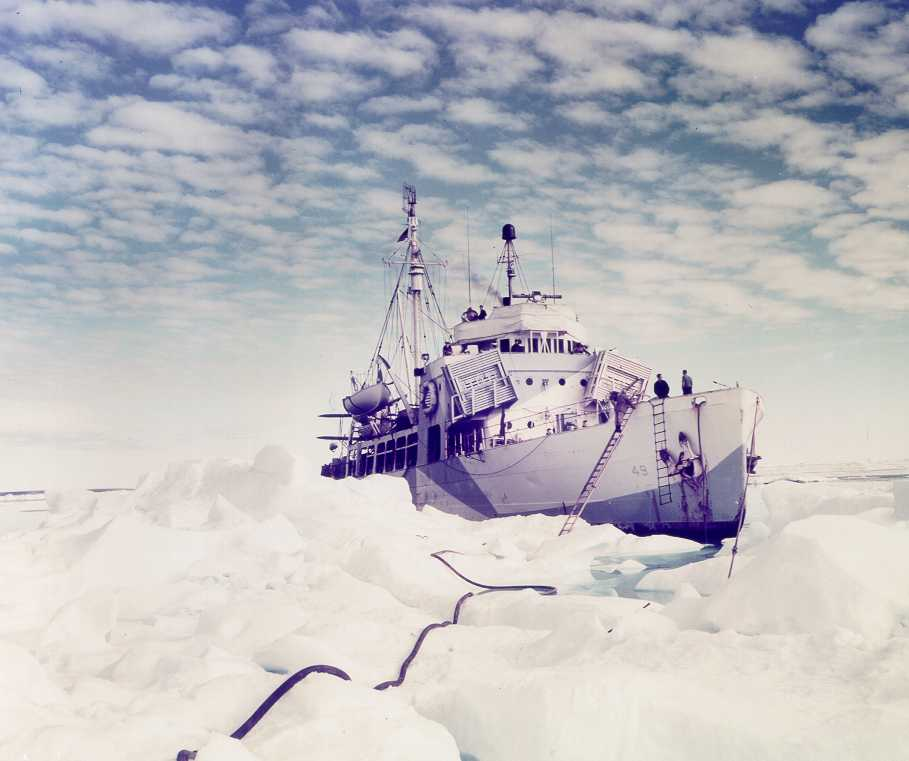
The USCG cutter Northland operating off Greenland.

The Greenland Patrol was a United States Coast Guard operation during World War II. The patrol was formed to support the U.S. Army building aerodrome facilities in Greenland for ferrying aircraft to the British Isles, and to defend Greenland with special attention to preventing German operations in the northeast. Coast Guard cutters were assisted by aircraft and dog sled teams patrolling the Greenland coast for Axis military activities. The patrol escorted Allied shipping to and from Greenland, built navigation and communication facilities, and provided rescue and weather ship services in the area from 1941 through 1945.

== Background ==
Earth's atmospheric circulation pattern requires westerly meteorological observations for prediction of weather conditions to the east. Weather observation stations in Greenland improved the accuracy of weather forecasting for the Atlantic Ocean and northern Europe for tactical advantage in the Battle of the Atlantic and European theatre of World War II. Greenland had been part of the Danish colonial empire since 1814. Greenland appeared relatively unprotected following German occupation of Denmark on 9 April 1940. The Allies of World War II became concerned about the possibility of Axis military bases on Greenland. The cryolite mine at Ivittuut was a strategically important source of flux for electrolysis of aluminum ores by the Hall–Héroult process for aircraft production.

United States Coast Guard personnel had acquired extensive experience in the waters around Greenland as part of their International Ice Patrol duties since 1915. Following negotiations with the Danish Minister to Washington, the United States opened a consulate at Nuuk; and the USCGC Comanche transported the first American Consul to Ivittuut in May 1940. The United States then agreed to sell armaments to Greenland; and fourteen Coast Guardsmen were discharged to act as civilian armed guards protecting the cryolite mine with a 3-inch (7.6 cm) gun offloaded from the USCGC Campbell. USCGC Duane conducted an air survey of Greenland's west coast in August 1940, while USCGC Northland cruised along Greenland's east coast searching for evidence of European military activity and compiling information for publication of a Greenland Pilot. Northland discovered three weather reporting stations being operated by Norwegians reporting conditions to Germany. The United States State Department reported the situation to British authorities who dispatched a Norwegian gunboat to arrest the Norwegians and close the weather stations. On 17 March 1941 USCGC Cayuga sailed from Boston with the South Greenland Survey Expedition to locate and recommend sites for airfields, seaplane bases, radio stations, meteorological stations, and aids to navigation. Northland relieved Cayuga on 17 May 1941 to continue the survey expedition after Cayuga was turned over to the Royal Navy as HMS Totland.

The United States occupied Greenland on 9 April 1941 under the expansive doctrine adopted at the Havana Conference (1940). As the survey results became available, construction began on a radio and aerological station on Akia Island and airfields at Narsarsuaq and at Kipisako near Ivittuut. Narsarsuaq Air Base was code-named Bluie West 1 (or BW1), and became the major Allied airfield in Greenland. Thousands of planes stopped there to refuel en route to England.

In the autumn of 1942, Germany implemented Operation Notch transporting a weather party to eastern Greenland aboard the weather ship Hermann. The ship remained icebound while the weather party radioed weather observations hoping they would not be found in the darkness of polar winter. Similar weather station Operations Viola and Edelweiss were supported by the weather ships Coburg in the autumn of 1943, and Kehdingen in the autumn of 1944.

== History ==
A South Greenland Patrol was established on 1 June 1941 with Geodetic Survey ship Bowdoin, tug USS Raritan, and cutters USCGC Comanche and USCGC Modoc. USS Bear with USCGC North Star and USCGC Northland established a Northeast Greenland Patrol a month later. The two patrols were consolidated in October 1941 as Task Force 24.8, the Greenland Patrol of the Atlantic Fleet. USCG Commander Edward H. Smith, who had been in charge of the Northeast Greenland Patrol, was given command of the combined force and soon afterward promoted to captain.

On 12 September 1941 Northland intercepted the Norwegian sealer Buskø, which was supporting a German radio station transmitting weather information to Germany. Northland put a prize crew aboard Buskø, captured the radio station with some code information, and interned the personnel at Boston.

The Greenland Patrol was responsible for escorting ships bringing men and supplies to Greenland, and sometimes for breaking a path through the ice to assist their arrival. On 25 August 1942 USCGC Mojave was escorting the United States Army Transport Chatham as the fast section of convoy SG 6 while USCGC Mohawk and Algonquin were escorting the slow section of USS Laramie and Harjurand with steamships Biscaya, Arlyn and Alcoa Guard. Chatham and Arlyn were sunk by U-517 and Laramie was damaged by U-165.

Danes, Norwegians, and Inuit were recruited into a sledge patrol to search for additional Axis weather reporting stations along the coast. Sledge expeditions also rescued Allied airmen making forced landings on the Greenland ice cap. Coast Guard work parties built range lights, shore markers and LORAN radio beacons to aid navigation. Northland landed 41 men with thirty tons of equipment to establish a high-frequency direction finding station on Jan Mayen in November 1942. The sledge patrol attacked the Operation Notch weather station supported by Hermann and captured some weather station personnel before the remainder were rescued by German aircraft. Hermann was sunk by allied aircraft.

The Greenland Patrol was augmented in the summer of 1942 by ten fishing trawlers purchased in Boston, repainted in blue and white Thayer system camouflage, and given Inuit names. Natsek disappeared on 17 December 1942 while transiting the Strait of Belle Isle with Nanok and Bluebird in gale-force winds with blinding snow. The 116-foot (35 m) trawler was never seen again, and may have been capsized by ice accumulation from freezing spray in heavy seas. Surviving trawlers were returned to their civilian owners in 1944 as Tacoma-class frigates became available for weather ship duties.

SS Dorchester of convoy SG 19 was torpedoed by U-223 on 2 February 1943 while being escorted by USCGC Tampa, Escanaba and Comanche. Despite rescue efforts by the cutters, 675 men died of hypothermia or drowning in the worst United States troopship sinking of the war. Escanaba was later destroyed by a mysterious explosion on 13 June 1943.

From October 1943 Coast Guard Patrol Bombing Squadron Six operated twelve Consolidated PBY Catalinas from Narsarsuaq Air Base, Naval Station Argentia, and Reykjavík Airport providing reconnaissance, antisubmarine patrol, mail delivery, rescue service, and observation surveys of ice conditions for ships of the Greenland Patrol. Aircraft greatly improved patrol efficiency when weather conditions were suitable for flying. Ships of the Greenland Patrol acted as plane guards on weather patrol stations in the Davis Strait, Denmark Strait, and south of Cape Farewell maintaining radio contact with trans-Atlantic aircraft flights and provided rescue service for aircraft ditching at sea. In November 1943, USCG Commodore Earl G. Rose, a decorated veteran of World War I escort duty, succeeded Edward Smith as commander of the Greenland Patrol.

Between July and October 1944, Northland, Storis, Eastwind and Southwind operated against Axis weather stations on the northeast coast of Greenland. Coburg was destroyed in July after being damaged by ice and her weather party evacuated by a U-boat. Northland intercepted Kehdingen and captured her German weather party, while escaping an attack by the escorting U-703 when the U-boat's torpedoes detonated on floating ice. Failure of the first attempt at Operation Edelweiss produced a followup effort by the weather ship Externsteine which was similarly intercepted. Capture of sixty German weather personnel effectively ended Axis weather observation from Greenland in October 1944.

== Ships of the Greenland Patrol ==
Some ships of the Greenland Patrol were conventional cutters briefly assigned to the patrol. Others were unique and sometimes historic vessels specifically designed for polar exploration and well suited to conditions encountered by the patrol. Larger cutters escorted SG convoys of freighters and troopships between Sydney and the larger Greenland ports serving Narsarsuaq Air Base and the Ivittuut cryolite mine, while trawlers and tugs (sometimes towing barges) distributed supplies from those ports to smaller Army Bluie bases on remote fjords without port facilities.

Three cutters in the Patrol (Bear, Bowdoin and Northland) were equipped with sails. This was, most probably, the last time sail powered ships were used for wartime missions.

Name	Class	Displacement	Speed	Guns	Launched	Notes
Bear	unique	648 tons			1874	Bering Sea weather ship built as a seal catcher; carried a seaplane
Bowdoin	unique	110 tons			1921	arctic exploration schooner
Modoc; Mojave; Tampa	Tampa-class cutters	1,780 tons	16 knots	2 × 5"/51 caliber guns	1921	
Alatok		386 tons			1922	105-foot (32 m) naval trawler formerly Hekla
Active; Faunce; Frederick Lee; Travis	Active-class patrol boats	220 tons	11 knots	1 × 3"/23 caliber gun	1926-1927	
Northland	unique	2,065 tons	11 knots	2 × 3"/50 caliber guns	1927	Cork-insulated steel hull with icebreaker bow designed for Bering Sea operations; carried a Curtiss SOC Seagull seaplane. Equipped with sails.
Albatross; Bluebird		256 tons		1 × 3"/23 caliber gun	1931	minesweeping naval trawlers
North Star	unique	1,435 tons		1 × 3"/23 caliber gun	1932	wooden-hulled survey ship; carried a seaplane
Algonquin; Comanche; Escanaba; Mohawk; Tahoma	Algonquin-class cutters	1,005 tons	13 knots	2 × 3"/50 caliber guns	1932-1934	
Arluk		163 tons			1934	102-foot (31 m) naval trawler formerly Atlantic
Aivik		251 tons			1936	118-foot (36 m) naval trawler formerly Arlington
Arvek		172 tons			1936	102-foot (31 m) naval trawler formerly Triton
Atak		243 tons			1937	118-foot (36 m) naval trawler formerly Winchester
Amarok		237 tons			1938	119-foot (36 m) naval trawler formerly Lark
Arundel; Raritan; Manitou		328 tons	12 knots		1939	110-foot (34 m) ice-breaking tugs
Nogak		176 tons			1940	105-foot (32 m) naval trawler formerly St. George
Aklak		170 tons			1941	110-foot (34 m) naval trawler formerly Weymouth
Nanok		220 tons		1 × 3"/23 caliber gun	1941	115-foot (35 m) naval trawler formerly North Star
Natsek		225 tons		1 × 3"/23 caliber gun	1941	110-foot (34 m) naval trawler formerly Belmont. Lost with crew on or after December 17, 1942.
Storis	unique	1,715 tons	13 knots	2 × 3"/50 caliber gun	1943	light icebreaker; carried a seaplane
Eastwind; Southwind	Wind-class icebreakers	3,500 tons	16 knots	4 × 5"/38 caliber guns	1943	carried a seaplane
Citrus; Evergreen; Laurel		935 tons	14 knots	1 × 3"/50 caliber gun	1943	buoy tenders used as freighters, light icebreakers, and convoy escorts
SC 527; SC 528; SC 688; SC 689; SC 704; SC 705	SC-497-class submarine chasers	95 tons	20 knots	1 × 3"/50 caliber gun	1941-1944	

== Greenland Patrol Memorial ==
There is an annual memorial wreath dedication in memory of the Greenland Patrol, conducted by the U.S. Coast Guard.

== Greenland Patrol in literature ==
=== Fiction ===
- Wilson, Sloan, Ice Brothers. 1979. (Arbor House). ISBN 978-0-87795-232-9

=== Nonfiction ===
- United States Coast Guard Aviation History. n.d., 1941: The Coast Guard and the Greenland Operations
- Novak, Thaddeus D. and P.J. Capelotti. 1942. Life and Death on the Greenland Patrol, Reissued by the University Press of Florida (2005). ISBN 978-0-8130-2912-2. Novak kept a diary of his time as a Coast Guardsman in the North Atlantic.
- Tilley, John A. The Coast Guard and the Greenland Patrol
- Wilson, Sloan. 1976. What Shall We Wear to This Party?: The Man in the Gray Flannel Suit, Twenty Years Before & After (Arbor House). ISBN 978-0-87795-119-3. Part 2, "Ignorance is Death," pp. 55–129, describes the author's entry into the U.S. Coast Guard as an ensign, assigned first to the USS Tampa. He was transferred to the U.S. Coast Guard Cutter Nogak to become executive officer and later promoted to captain.

== Notes ==
=== References used ===
- "World War II Greenland Patrol honored during ceremony". The Day. New London, Connecticut: The Day Publishing Company. 6 June 2016.
- Hussey, Brian F. Jr. "The U.S. Navy, The Neutrality Patrol, and Atlantic Fleet Escort Operations 1939−1941" (PDF). United States Naval Academy. Archived (PDF) from the original on 6 December 2015.
- Kafka, Roger; Pepperburg, Roy L. (1946). Warships of the World. Cornell Maritime Press.
- Morison, Samuel Eliot (1975). History of United States Naval Operations in World War II, Volume 1: The Battle of the Atlantic September 1939 – May 1943. Boston: Little, Brown and Company.
- Morison, Samuel Eliot (1962). History of United States Naval Operations in World War II, Volume 15: Supplement and General Index. Boston: Little, Brown and Company.
- Novak, Thaddeus D. "Death of a Wooden Shoe" (PDF). United States Coast Guard.
- Ruge, Friedrich (1957). Der Seekrieg. Annapolis, Maryland: United States Naval Institute.
- Silverstone, Paul H. (1968). U.S. Warships of World War II. Garden City, New York: Doubleday & Company.
- Tilley, John A. "The Coast Guard and the Greenland Patrol" (PDF). United States Coast Guard.
- Willoughby, Malcolm F. (1957). The U.S. Coast Guard in World War II. Annapolis, Maryland: United States Naval Institute.
