= USCGC Storis (WMEC-38) =

U.S.Coast Guard cutter and icebreaker (1942–2007)

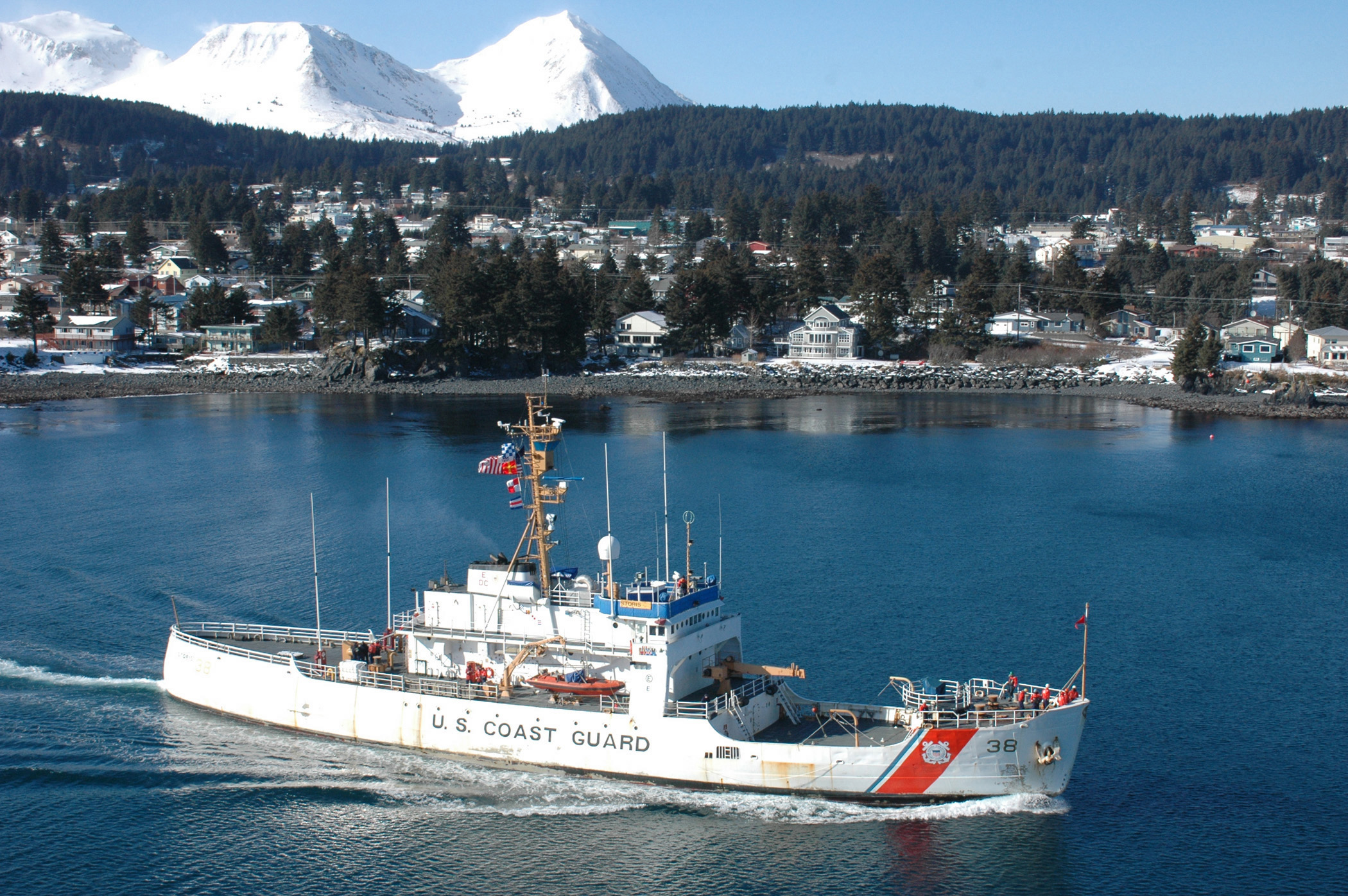
- The USCGC Storis (WMEC-38), after decommissioning.

History

United States
- Name: USCGC Storis
- Ordered: 26 January 1941
- Builder: Toledo Shipbuilding Company, Toledo, Ohio
- Cost: $2,072,889 USD (hull & machinery)
- Laid down: 14 July 1941
- Launched: 4 April 1942
- Commissioned: 30 September 1942
- Decommissioned: 12 February 2007
- Identification: Callsign: NRUC
- Motto: ALASXAM ILAQAAN MAYAAQISNIIKACHXIIZAX (Great Hunter of Alaskan Waters)
- Nickname(s): "The Galloping Ghost of the Alaskan Coast"; "Queen of the Fleet" (before decommissioning)
- Fate: Scrapped

General characteristics
- Displacement: 2,030 long tons (2,060 t)
- Length: 230 ft (70 m)
- Beam: 43 ft 2 in (13.16 m)
- Draft: 15 ft (4.6 m)
- Propulsion: Diesel-electric
- Speed: 14 kn (26 km/h; 16 mph)
- Range: 22,000 mi (35,000 km)
- Complement: 12 officers; 72 enlisted (2006)
- Sensors & processing systems: SPS-64 I-band navigation search radar
- Armament: 1 × 25mm Mk 38 MOD 0 gun; 2 × .50 cal M2 Browning machine guns
- USCGC STORIS (cutter)
- U.S. National Register of Historic Places
- NRHP reference No.: 12001110
- Added to NRHP: 31 December 2012

USCGC Storis (WAGL-38/WAG-38/WAGB-38/WMEC-38) was a light icebreaker and medium endurance cutter which served in the United States Coast Guard for 64 years and 5 months, making her the oldest vessel in commission with the Coast Guard fleet at the time of her decommissioning.

== World War II ==
The ship was laid down by the Toledo Shipbuilding Company of Toledo, Ohio, on 14 July 1941. Storis was launched on 4 April 1942 and commissioned on 30 September 1942 as an ice patrol tender. Initially assigned to the North Atlantic during World War II, Storis participated in the Greenland Patrols. She was tasked with patrolling the east coast of Greenland to prevent the establishment of German weather stations. During her first years, Storis operated in the very waters from which her name was derived. Originally to be named Eskimo, the U.S. Department of State objected to the name of the new cutter on the basis that the natives of Greenland would be offended by the name. "Storis" is a Scandinavian word meaning "great ice."

On 10 June 1943, she began escorting convoy GS-24 from Narsarssuak to St. John's, Newfoundland, in company with the USCGC Mojave (flag), Tampa, Escanaba, and Algonquin, the convoy consisting of USAT Fairfax and USS Raritan. At 0510 on the 13th, dense black and yellow smoke was reported rising from the Escanaba. She sank at 0513. Storis and Raritan were ordered to investigate and rescue survivors while the rest of the convoy began zigzagging and steering evasive courses to avoid submarines. At 0715 the two cutters returned, having rescued two survivors and found the body of Lt. Robert H. Prause, which was on the Raritan. No explosion had been heard by the other escort vessels. The entire crew of 103 of the Escanaba was lost with the exception of these two men.

== Post World War II career ==
Following the war, the homeport of Storis was changed from Boston to Curtis Bay, Maryland. On 15 September 1948, Storis was reassigned to Juneau, Alaska where she participated in the Bering Sea Patrol, which entailed delivering medical, dental and judicial services to isolated native villages in the far reaches of the territory. At the same time, Storis assisted in establishing Alaskan LORAN radio-navigation stations, provided supplies for the Distant Early Warning Line and conducted hydrographic surveys in the uncharted waters off the Arctic.

On 1 July 1957, Storis departed in company with the Coast Guard Cutters Bramble and Spar to search for a deep draft channel through the Arctic Ocean and to collect hydrographic information. Shortly after her return in late 1957, the Storis was reassigned to her new homeport of Kodiak, Alaska.

In 1972, Storis underwent a major renovation converting her from a light icebreaker to a medium endurance cutter. With the change in designation, there also came a change in primary duties. The primary functions of Storis shifted to enforcing laws and treaties of the domestic and foreign fisheries in the Bering Sea and Gulf of Alaska. Storis underwent another major maintenance overhaul in 1986 that replaced her power plant and expanded her living quarters to include a new berthing area for women and a lounge for the crew.

== Media ==
Storis participated in the rescue of the fishing vessel Alaskan Monarch, off Saint Paul Island, in March 1990. Video of this incident often appears on TV shows such as Deadliest Catch, to illustrate the dangers of working in Bering Sea waters. Storis also had a cameo in the 2006 film The Guardian.

== Decommissioning ==
Storis was decommissioned in a ceremony in Kodiak on 8 February 2007. The cutter then sailed to Alameda, California, where it was made ready for its immediate destination as part of the "Mothball Fleet" at Suisun Bay.

In July 2012 the nomination of the Storis for listing on the National Register of Historic Places was accepted by the State of California. It was formally listed on the Register on 31 December 2012.

On 12 June 2013 the Storis was put up for public auction by the General Services Administration with a starting bid of US$60,000 after an unforeseen "procedural difficulty" ended negotiations with the Storis Museum. However the auction failed to reach its reserve price when the auction closed on 27 June 2013. The Storis was towed on 25 October 2013 from California to Mexico where the ship was scheduled to be scrapped.

After commissioning, the commercial icebreaker Aiviq acquired by the USCG in 2024 was renamed USCGC Storis (WAGB-21).

== Awards ==
- Coast Guard Presidential Unit Citation with Hurricane Device
- Secretary of Transportation Outstanding Unit Award
- Coast Guard Unit Commendation (8 awards)
- Coast Guard Meritorious Unit Commendation (7 awards)
- Coast Guard E Ribbon (11 awards)
- Coast Guard Bicentennial Unit Commendation
- American Campaign Medal
- European–African–Middle Eastern Campaign Medal with one battle star
- World War II Victory Medal
- National Defense Service Medal with three service stars
- Coast Guard Arctic Service Medal (8 awards)
- Global War on Terrorism Service Medal
- Humanitarian Service Medal
- Special Operations Service Ribbon

== See also ==
Victor Mature

== Notes ==
Citations

References cited

- "Storis, 1942" (PDF). Cutters, Craft & U.S. Coast Guard-Manned Army & Navy Vessels. U.S. Coast Guard Historian's Office.
- "Former Coast Guard cutter Storis headed to scrap yard". News. Navy Times website.
- Johnson, Robert Irwin (1987). Guardians of the Sea, History of the United States Coast Guard, 1915 to the Present. Naval Institute Press, Annapolis, Maryland. ISBN 978-0-87021-720-3.
- Scheina, Robert L. (1982). U.S. Coast Guard Cutters & Craft of World War II. Naval Institute Press, Annapolis, Maryland. ISBN 978-0-87021-717-3.

| Preceded by USCGC Fir (WLM-212) | United States Coast Guard Queen of the Fleet; 1991–2007 | Succeeded by USCGC Acushnet (WMEC-167) |
