= Albatross-class minesweeper =

Albatross-class minesweeper may refer to one of the following minesweeper ship classes of the United States Navy:

- Albatross-class minesweeper (1940)
- Albatross-class minesweeper (1960)
