= USCGC Northland (WPG-49) =

United States Coast Guard ship

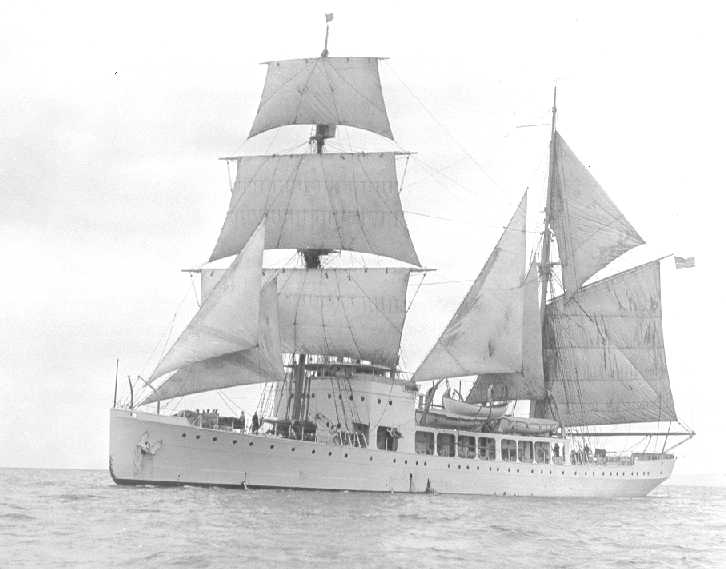
- USCGC Northland (WPG-49) circa 1929

History

United States
- Operator: United States Coast Guard
- Builder: Newport News Shipbuilding and Drydock Corporation, Newport News, Virginia
- Cost: US$865,750
- Laid down: 26 August 1926
- Launched: 5 February 1927
- Commissioned: 7 May 1927
- Decommissioned: 1938
- Recommissioned: June 1939
- Decommissioned: 27 March 1946
- Fate: Sold 3 January 1947

Israel
- Name: Jewish State
- Acquired: 1947
- Fate: To Israeli Navy 1948

Israel
- Name: INS Eilat
- Namesake: Eilat, Israel
- Operator: Israeli Navy
- Acquired: 1948
- Commissioned: 1948
- Renamed: Matzpen, 1955
- Decommissioned: February 1962
- Fate: Sold for scrap
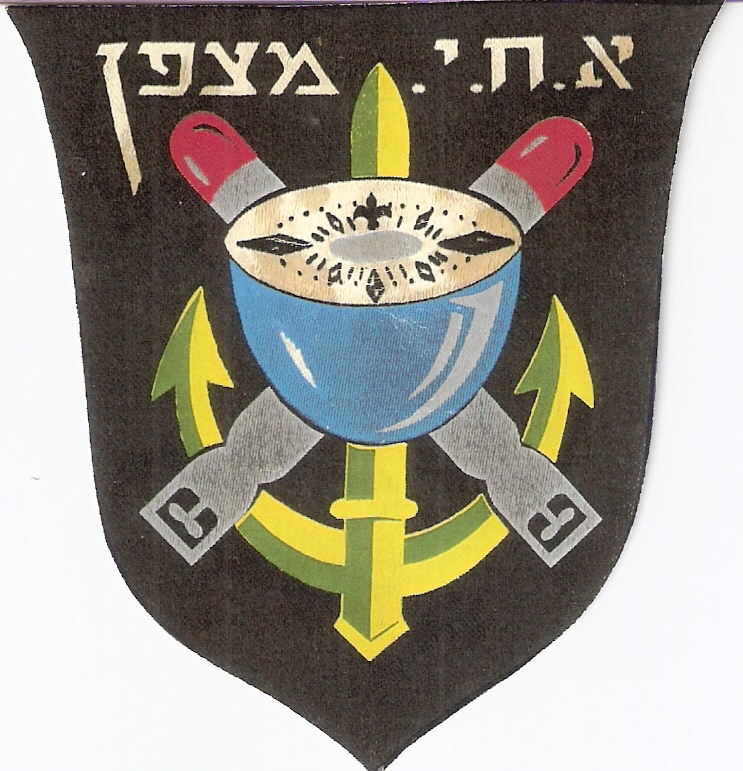
- Badge

General characteristics
- Displacement: 2,150 tons, maximum
- Length: 216 ft 7 in (66.01 m)
- Beam: 38 ft 9 in (11.81 m)
- Draft: 16 ft 9 in (5.11 m) max
- Installed power: Main: 1 double-armature electric motor driven by 2 generators driven by 2 x 6-cylinder diesel engines.; Auxiliary: Sail (1927–1936)
- Propulsion: single screw, 4 blades
- Speed: 11.7 knots (1927)
- Range: 12,000 nautical miles (22,000 km) @ 10 knots; 18,800 nautical miles (34,800 km) @ 8.2 knots
- Complement: 90 men, 17 officers (1927); 102 men, 18 officers (1945)
- Sensors & processing systems: Detection Radar: SC-1, SF; Sonar: QCJ-3
- Armament: 2 × 6-pounders, 1 x 1-pounder (1941); 2 × 3"/50 single mounts (1944); 2 × 3"/50 single mounts; 4 x 20mm/80 single mounts; 2 depth charge tracks; 2 Y guns (1945)
- Aircraft carried: 1 × SOC-4 (1941); 1 × J2F-5 (1942–1944)

USCGC Northland (WPG-49) was a United States Coast Guard cruising class of gunboat especially designed for Arctic operations in commission from 1927 to 1938 and from 1939 to 1946. She served during World War II. She was the last cruising cutter built for the Coast Guard equipped with a sailing rig.

After her U.S. Coast Guard career ended, the ship served as a refugee ship collecting holocaust survivors in Europe with a goal of breaching the blockade to British-Mandated Palestine. After Israel was recognized as a state, she served as the flagship of the Israeli Navy with the name INS Eilat.

== Design ==
Northland was designed to be a replacement for the Arctic cutter Bear and was built at Newport News Shipbuilding and Drydock Corporation, Newport News, Virginia, launched on 5 February 1927 and commissioned on 7 May 1927. She was 216.6 ft (66.0 m) long, had a maximum displacement of 2,150 tons, and had diesel-electric propulsion driving a single four-blade screw. She was originally fitted with auxiliary sails using yards, but they were removed and her tall masts were trimmed in 1936. She was structurally reinforced to withstand hull pressures of 100 psi (689 kPa) and lined with cork for warmth. One feature used in the construction was the welding of the hull rather than riveting; this was done for strength and was not a common practice in 1926.

== U.S. Coast Guard Service ==
=== Bering Sea Patrol ===
After a shakedown cruise, Northland was ordered to San Francisco, California on 7 June 1927. Her home port was shifted to Seattle, Washington, temporarily but she returned to San Francisco in November 1927. On 8 June 1928 Northland arrived in Nome, Territory of Alaska, to begin her first Bering Sea Patrol. Each May during the years 1929 through 1938 she began a patrol of the Bering Sea, where she assisted in the performance of many governmental functions. For the United States Department of Justice, she enforced the law, apprehended criminals, and transported floating courts. She gathered military intelligence for the United States Department of the Navy, and carried mail for the United States Post Office Department. For the United States Department of the Interior, she carried teachers to their posts, conducted sanitation inspections, and guarded timber and game. Northland surveyed coastlines and regional industries for the United States Department of Commerce and carried United States Public Health Service personnel to isolated villages otherwise without medical service.

Northland departed the United States West Coast in 1938 on her last Arctic cruise, after which she was decommissioned. In June 1939, however, she was recommissioned and transferred to Boston, Massachusetts, to prepare for the second Byrd Antarctic Expedition. With the outbreak of World War II in Europe in September 1939, Northland was removed from participation in the expedition and was assigned a new home port at Alameda, California.

=== World War II service ===
As a result of the German invasion of Denmark on 9 April 1940, Northland entered the New York Navy Yard at Brooklyn, New York in May 1940 to be outfitted for special duty in Greenland. Accompanied by cutters USCGC Duane (WPG-33), USCGC Modoc (WPG-46), and USCGC Raritan (WYT-93), she embarked on her first Greenland survey on 20 August 1940 with the purpose of charting harbors in order to determine the best location for patrol forces. The information that resulted contributed to the composition of a Greenland pilot volume and new charts. These were subsequently utilized in the formal organization of the Greenland Patrol after the United States and the Danish government-in-exile signed an agreement 9 April 1941 which included Greenland in the United States' system of cooperative defense of the Western Hemisphere.

Northland set out on 7 April 1941 on a two-month cruise to assist in the South Greenland Survey Expedition. While conducting this survey she searched for victims of ships sunk in the North Atlantic Ocean during the Battle of the Atlantic. While on one of her many mercy missions, she was involved in a near catastrophe when, while operating only 6 nautical miles (11 km; 6.9 mi) from the scene of a battle on 26–27 May 1941 between the German battleship Bismarck and the British ships that finally sank the German warship, the British mistook Northland for a German ship and very nearly took her under fire.

On 1 June 1941, the U.S. Coast Guard organized the South Greenland Patrol with the cutters USCGC Comanche (WPG-76), Modoc, and Raritan, and the former United States Coast and Geodetic Survey survey ship Bowdoin, with Bowdoin under the command of her original owner, the legendary Arctic explorer Commander Donald B. MacMillan.) On 1 July 1941, the Coast Guard organized the Northeast Greenland Patrol with Northland, the former United States Department of the Interior ship USCGC North Star (WPG-59), and USS Bear with Captain Edward H. "Iceberg" Smith, USCG, in command.

Northland sighted the German-controlled Norwegian sealer SS Buskø on 12 September 1941 and sent a boarding party to investigate. Northland seized Buskø and took her to MacKenzie Bay on the Greenland coast, where Buskø became the first American naval capture of World War II. It was believed that she had been sending weather reports and information on British shipping to the Germans. A search of Buskø also led to the discovery of a German radio station about 500 miles (800 km) up the Greenland coast from Mackenzie Bay. A night raiding party from Northland detained three Germans at Peter Bregt and captured their equipment, codes, and German plans for other radio stations in the far north.

The two patrols in Greenland were consolidated into a single Greenland Patrol under Smith on 25 October 1941. On 1 November 1941, the Coast Guard was transferred from the United States Department of the Treasury to the United States Department of the Navy for duration of World War II. On 7 December 1941, the United States entered World War II with the Japanese attack on Pearl Harbor.

Northland sighted and attacked a submarine in Davis Strait on 18 June 1942. The presence of oil and bubbles indicated possible hits from the cutter's depth charges, but German records give no indication of a submarine sinking in this area.

Northland carried an amphibious aircraft, a Grumman J2F Duck flown by Lieutenant John A. Pritchard. On multiple occasions the aircraft was a significant asset in search and rescue as well as military operations. Ultimately, while on a rescue mission involving a downed United States Army Air Forces B-17 Flying Fortress bomber on the Greenland ice sheet in November 1942, the Duck crashed in whiteout conditions, killing its two-man crew (Lieutenant Pritchard and Radioman First Class Benjamin A. Bottoms) as well as a third man they had rescued from the B-17. Pritchard and Bottoms became the second and third U.S. Coast Guardsmen to become missing in action in World War II.

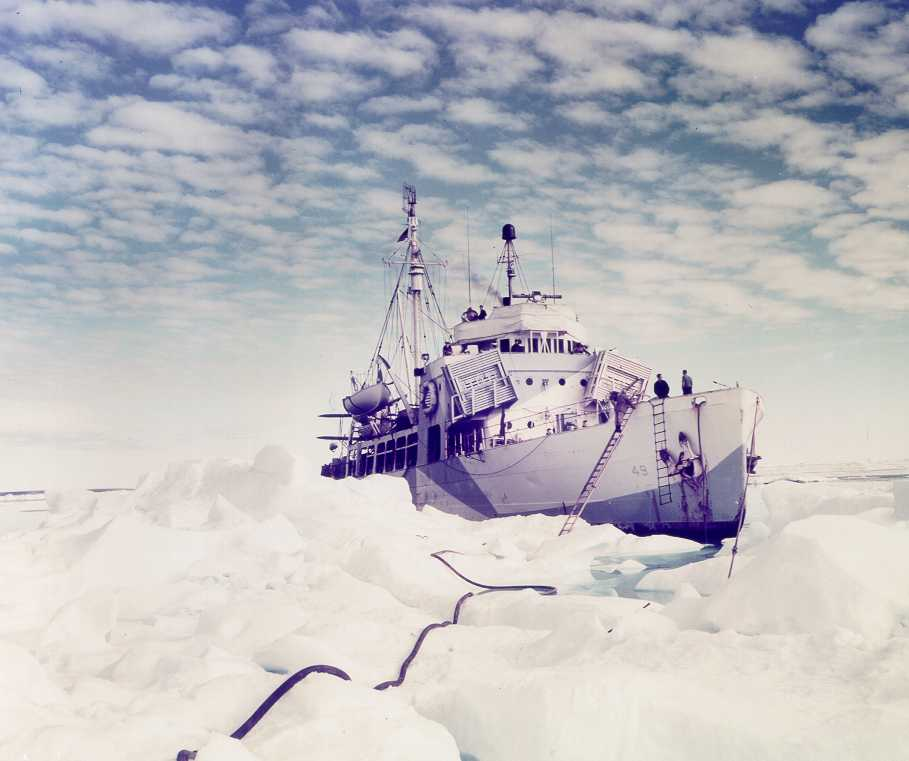
Northland in Greenland circa 1944

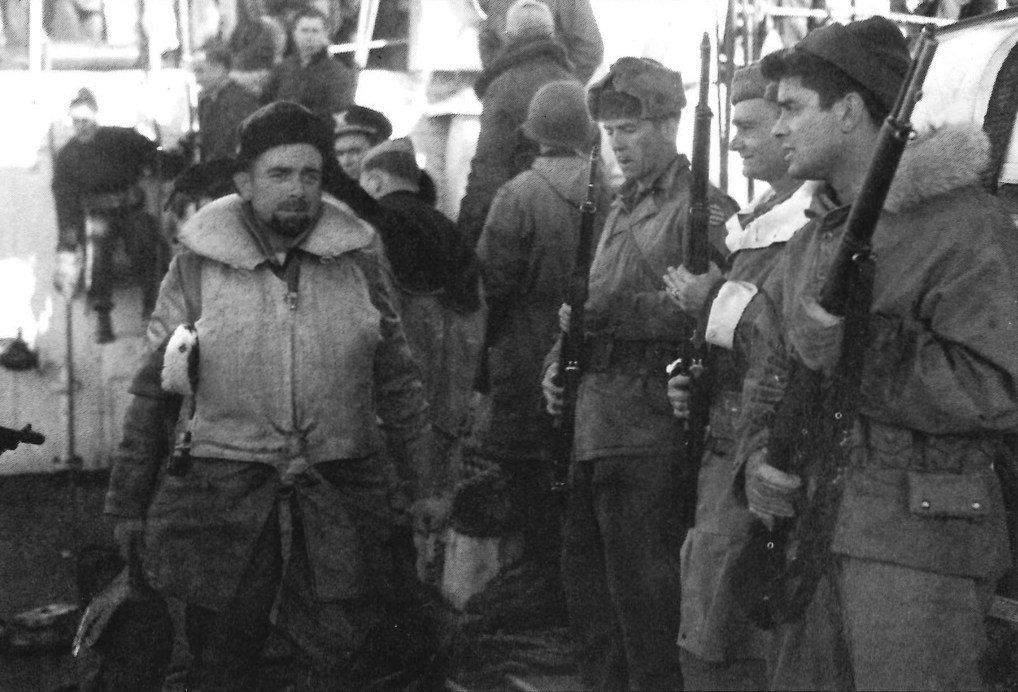
Captured German weather personnel on Northland

By 1943, the Greenland Patrol force had grown to include 37 vessels. In July 1944 Northland discovered a German trawler believed to be the weather ship Coburg — suspected of carrying three separate German expeditions to Greenland — which had been completely gutted by a fire her crew set. A second German weather ship, (Kehdingen), was disposed of in September 1944 after Northland pursued her for 70 nautical miles (130 km; 81 mi) through ice floes off Great Koldewey Island The Germans scuttled their ship, then surrendered and were taken aboard Northland.

Northland had a hand in the desegregation of the U.S. Coast Guard. While executive officer of the ship during World War II, Lieutenant Carlton Skinner witnessed Steward Oliver Henry, who had been an automobile mechanic before the war, figure out a way to repair Northland′s main drive engine after it had broken down during a patrol. This convinced Skinner that African American sailors were just as capable as white sailors. Skinner would later command USCGC Sea Cloud, the first racially integrated U.S. warship since the American Civil War (1861–1865).

World War II ended in Europe in May 1945 and came to a complete end with the cessation of hostilities with Japan in August 1945. Northland received two battle stars for her World War II service. she was returned to the control of the U.S. Department of the Treasury on 1 January 1946 and remained on weather patrol duty until she decommissioned on 27 March 1946.

=== Honors and awards ===
- American Defense Service Medal with "A" device
- American Campaign Medal
- European-African-Middle Eastern Campaign Medal with two battle stars
- World War II Victory Medal

== Refugee ship ==
The Northland was purchased on January 1947 by the Weston Trading Company, a front company for the Aliyah Bet. She was refitted and repaired in Baltimore. The Northland set sail for France, on May 1 under the Panamanian flag, along side her sister ship the Paducah. Both vessels docked in Bayonne, France, where they were outfitted with sleeping racks for passengers. After these repairs and outfitting were completed, both ships were to set sail for Russian controlled Eastern Europe. Several preceding Aliyah Bet ships had been captured by the British, the refugees had been interned in a detention camp in Cyprus. The British now intended to send refugees back to their country of origin. To oppose this plan, Aliyah Bet intended to transport Jewish refugees from Eastern Europe with the understanding the Russians would not accept their return.

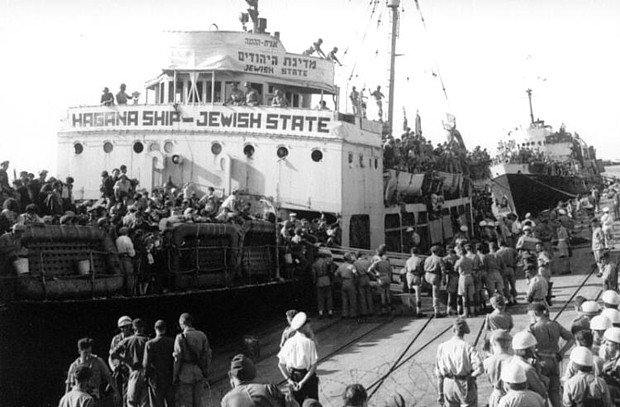
Hagana Ship - Jewish State at Haifa Port (1947)

The Northland set sail towards Eastern Europe on August 28. After passing Gibralter, she was trailed by British destroyers until she reached the Dardanelles straight. Crossing the Black Sea, she reached Burgas, Bulgaria on September 12, and collected nearly 2700 refugees. On September 26, the Northland set sail the Bosphorus and the Dardanelles Straight where she was met again by British destroyers as she entered the Aegean Sea. As she entered the Mediterranean Sea, the Northland took on her Hebrew name, Jewish State, followed by British destroyers. Through evasive maneuvers, the Jewish State set a course towards Tel Aviv, yet after the British boarded the ship, she was towed to Haifa on October 3 and the refugees were interned in a mention camp in Cyprus.

== Service in the Israeli Navy ==
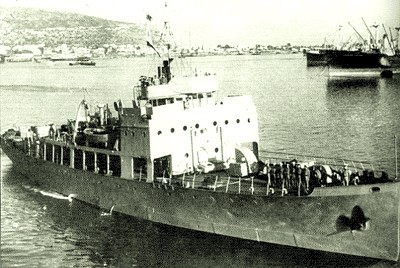
A-16

After Israel was recognized as an independent state in 1948 the State of Israel served as the INS Eilat A-16 and became the flagship of the Israeli Navy. During the first Arab-Israeli War, she participated in the operations to expel the Arab villages of Al-Tira, Haifa, Sarafand and Kafr Lam by shelling them from thé sea. In 1955, the ship was renamed INS Matzpen, serving as a barracks or depot hulk. The ship was decommissioned in February 1962 and sold for scrap.

== See also ==
- Jonsbu Station

== Notes ==
=== References used ===
- This article incorporates text from the public domain Dictionary of American Naval Fighting Ships.
- "Northland (WPG-49), 1927". Cutters, Craft & U.S. Coast Guard-Manned Army & Navy Vessels. U.S. Coast Guard Historian's Office.
- "Record of Movements, Vessels of the United States Coast Guard, 1790–December 31, 1933 (1989 reprint)" (PDF). U.S. Coast Guard Historian's Office.
- Canney, Donald L. (1995). U.S. Coast Guard and Revenue Cutters, 1790–1935. Naval Institute Press, Annapolis, Maryland. ISBN 978-1-55750-101-1.
- Evanson, Christopher (4 April 2007). "Looking Back: A Veteran Remembers Coast Guard Desegregation". Coast Guard News.
- Johnson, Robert Irwin (1987). Guardians of the Sea, History of the United States Coast Guard, 1915 to the Present. Naval Institute Press, Annapolis, Maryland. ISBN 978-0-87021-720-3.
- Scheina, Robert L. (1982). U.S. Coast Guard Cutters & Craft of World War II. Naval Institute Press, Annapolis, Maryland. ISBN 978-0-87021-717-3.
- Walling, Michael G. (2004). Bloodstained Sea: the U.S. Coast Guard in the Battle of the Atlantic, 1941–1944. International Marine/McGraw-Hill, Camden, Maine. ISBN 978-0-07-142401-1.
- Zuckoff, Mitchell (2013). Frozen in Time. New York, New York: HarperCollins. ISBN 978-0-06-213343-4.
