= USS Bluebird (AM-72) =

Minesweeper of the United States Navy

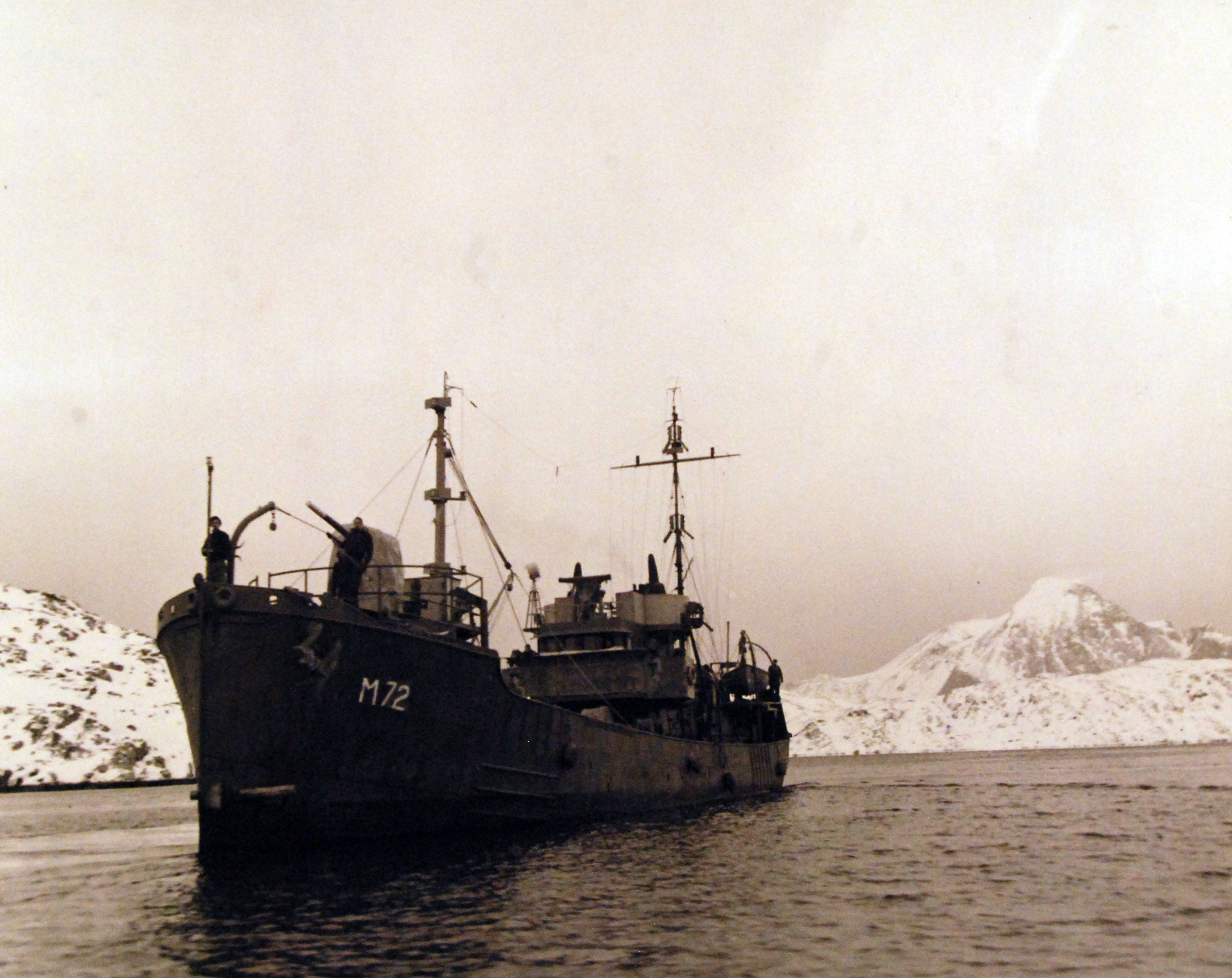

History

United States
- Ordered: as M/V Maine
- Laid down: 25 October 1930
- Launched: 7 April 1931
- Acquired: 13 August 1940
- Commissioned: 22 November 1940
- Decommissioned: 12 January 1945
- Stricken: 19 January 1945
- Fate: Transferred to Norway

General characteristics
- Displacement: 520 tons
- Length: 132 ft 4 in (40.34 m)
- Beam: 24 ft (7.3 m)
- Draught: 13 ft (4.0 m)
- Propulsion: one Fairbanks Morse diesel engine, 550shp, one shaft
- Speed: 10 kts
- Complement: unknown
- Armament: one single 3 in (76 mm) gun mount

USS Bluebird (AM-72) was an Albatross-class minesweeper acquired by the U.S. Navy during World War II for clearing minefields during fleet operations.

M/V Maine—a steel-hulled fishing trawler constructed in 1931 at Bath, Maine, by Bath Iron Works—was purchased by the Navy on 13 August 1940 from the Booth Fisheries Co., Boston, Massachusetts; renamed Bluebird and designated a minesweeper, AM-72, on 14 August 1940; converted to naval service at Boston, Massachusetts, by the General Ship & Engineering Works; and commissioned at the Boston Navy Yard on 22 November 1940.

== World War II service ==
Bluebird was assigned to Mine Squadron (MinRon) 7, Train, Atlantic Fleet. In the spring of 1941, the minesweeper moved south to Bermuda, where a naval operating base (NOB) had been established to support the newly established Neutrality Patrol. She served in Bermuda until late June, returning to the United States at Norfolk, Virginia, on 27 June. Bluebird operated along the U.S. East Coast as a unit of MinRon 7 until the spring of 1942. On 2 April 1942, she received orders assigning her to the 5th Naval District on a temporary basis. On 23 July, the minesweeper resumed duty with the Atlantic Fleet. By the first part of 1943, the warship was part of the Greenland Patrol, operating in the waters between Greenland and Iceland.

== Redesignated IX-172 ==
Bluebird patrolled the northern Atlantic until the fall of 1944. During that time, on 1 June 1944, she was redesignated IX-172. On 31 October 1944, she arrived in Boston, Massachusetts, and reported to the Commandant, 1st Naval District, preparatory to being laid up.

== Decommissioning ==
Bluebird was decommissioned on 12 January 1945, and her name was struck from the Navy list on 19 January 1945. On 15 November 1945, she was transferred to the Maritime Commission's War Shipping Administration for disposal.
