= German weather ship WBS 2 Coburg =

History

Germany
- Name: Coburg
- Owner: H. Bischoff & Co (1938–40); Kriegsmarine (1940–44)
- Port of registry: (Nazi Germany) Wesermünde, Germany (1938–40); (Nazi Germany) Kriegsmarine (1940–44)
- Builder: Schulte & Bruns
- Yard number: 125
- Launched: 1938
- Completed: August 1938
- Acquired: 1940
- Commissioned: 3 August 1940
- Out of service: 3 June 1944
- Identification: Code Letters DFDX (1938-40); WBS 2
- Fate: Trapped by ice, 16 October 1943 Abandoned, 3 June 1944

General characteristics
- Type: Fishing trawler (1938–40); Weather ship (1940–44)
- Tonnage: 344 GRT, 114 NRT
- Length: 41.35 metres (135 ft 8 in)
- Beam: 7.70 metres (25 ft 3 in)
- Depth: 2.97 metres (9 ft 9 in)
- Installed power: Diesel engine, 120 nhp
- Propulsion: Single screw propeller
- Speed: 11.5 knots (21.3 km/h)
- Complement: 18, plus 8 meteorologists (WWII)

Coburg was a fishing trawler that was built in 1938 and requisitioned by the Kriegsmarine in 1940. Converted to a weather ship, she became trapped in ice off the east coast of Greenland in October 1943 and was abandoned in June 1944.

== Description ==
Coburg was 41.35 metres (135 ft 8 in) long with a beam of 7.70 metres (25 ft 3 in). She had a depth of 2.97 metres (9 ft 9 in). She was powered by a 6-cylinder four-stroke single cycle single action diesel engine rated at 120 nhp. It drove a single screw propeller, which gave the vessel a speed of 11.5 knots (21.3 km/h). The engine was built by Maschinenfabriek Augsburg-Nürnburg AG, Augsburg.

== History ==
Coburg was built as yard number 125 in 1938 by Schulte & Bruns, Emden for H Bischoff & Co, Bremen, Germany. She was completed in August 1938. Her port of registry was Wesermünde and the Code Letters DFDX were allocated.

Coburg was requisitioned by the Kriegsmarine in 1940 and converted to a weather ship. She was commissioned on 3 August as WBS 2 Coburg. She had a complement of eighteen plus eight meteorologists.

On 15 March 1943, Coburg sailed from Hammerfest, Norway escorted by U-657 for Operation Viola. Her mission was to establish a new automatic weather station on Bear Island. On 28 August, she sailed from Narvik as part of the Bassgeiger Expedition. She became trapped by ice off the Île-de-France, Greenland, eventually making landfall at Cape Sussi, Shannon Island on 16 October. USCGC Northland of the Greenland Patrol failed to spot the ship. Her crew spent the winter in snow caves, with supplies being dropped to them by air. In November or December 1943, the Danish Slædepatruljen Sirius discovered the camp, but were unable to mount an attack at the time. An attack on 22 April 1944 was unsuccessful, although one German was killed. On 3 June, Coburg was scuttled and abandoned. The camp was evacuated by Junkers Ju 290 aircraft of 2 Staffeln, Fernaufklärungsgruppe 5 and the personnel returned to Trondheim, Norway. The burnt out wreck of Coburg was discovered on 24 July 1944 by USCGC Northland. Her crew destroyed the weather station.
