= USCGC Tampa (WPG-48) =

U.S. Coast Guard cutter (launched 1921)

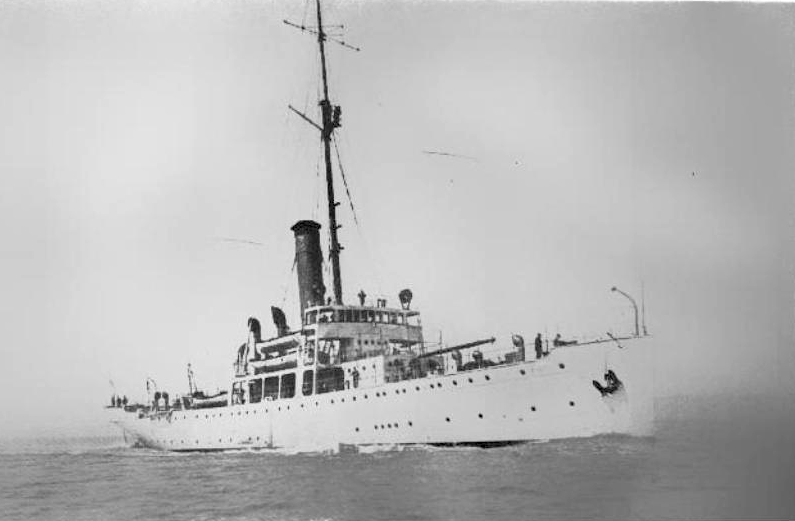
- Tampa, 1921

History

United States
- Name: USCGC Tampa
- Namesake: Tampa, Florida
- Builder: Union Construction Company, Oakland, California
- Laid down: 27 September 1920
- Launched: 19 April 1921
- Commissioned: 15 September 1921
- Decommissioned: 1 February 1947
- Fate: Transferred to United States Navy control as USS Tampa (WPG-48) in November 1941.
- Notes: Served in U.S. Navy as USS Tampa (WPG-48) 1941–1947.

General characteristics
- Class & type: Tampa class
- Type: United States Coast Guard Cutter
- Displacement: 1,955 tons (full load)
- Length: 240 ft (73 m)
- Beam: 39 ft (12 m)
- Draft: 17 ft 9 in (5.41 m) (maximum)
- Propulsion: GE turbo-electric transmission with 2 boilers
- Speed: 15.5 knots (28.7 km/h)
- Complement: 122
- Armament: 2 × 5-inch (127 mm) guns; 1 × 3-inch (76.2 mm) gun; 2 × 6-pounder guns

USCGC Tampa was a United States Coast Guard Cutter that served in the United States Coast Guard from 1921 to 1941, and then in the United States Navy from 1941 to 1947.

== Construction and design ==
Tampa was a steel-hulled, single-screw cutter laid down on 27 September 1920 at Oakland, California, by the Union Construction Company. She was launched on 19 April 1921, sponsored by Mrs. Joseph P. Conners.

The cutter was the lead of a series of electric propulsion ships built for the Coast Guard with a contract speed of 16 knots (18.4 mph; 29.6 km/h) that was exceeded on trials with an average speed over a measured mile of 16.3 knots (18.8 mph; 30.2 km/h). The propulsion plant consisted of two oil fired Babcock & Wilcox watertube boilers supplying steam driving a Curtis turbine directly driving a generator that supplied alternating current to a 2,600 horsepower electric drive motor. Propulsion controls were either electronic or by hand and the machinery was self lubricating with the notable result of ease of operation.

== History ==
The cutter was commissioned Tampa on 15 September 1921.

Tampa got underway for the United States East Coast, transited the Panama Canal on 28 October 1921, and arrived at New York City, New York, on 7 November 1921. On 23 November 1921, the cutter shifted to Boston, Massachusetts, her home port. In the ensuing years, Tampa operated as part of the International Ice Patrol established in the aftermath of the RMS Titanic tragedy in 1912. Between March and July – the peak months in which icebergs were regarded as a menace to the northernmost transatlantic sea lanes – Tampa conducted regular patrols, alternating with USCGC Modoc on 15-day stretches. At the end of each patrol, Tampa would put into Halifax, Nova Scotia, for stores and fuel. Between these cruises in the frigid waters at the northern end of the Atlantic, Tampa operated on exercises and maneuvers, sharpened her skill with target practice and battle drills, and patrolled sailing regattas.

Shifted to the New York division, with headquarters at Stapleton, New York, in August 1932, Tampa arrived at her new home port on 27 August 1932. She operated from this base until the late 1930s. During this time, she participated in the drama which accompanied the tragic fire on board the Ward Line steamer SS Morro Castle.

=== Morro Castle rescue ===
At about 0230 on the morning of 8 September 1934, a fire broke out aboard the ocean liner SS Morro Castle as she was returning from a Cuba cruise. The fires spread rapidly, and inept seamanship on the behalf of her captain – who had only taken command after the ship's regular master had died earlier that evening – resulted in the loss of many lives.

Moored at Staten Island, New York, when Morro Castle caught fire, Tampa received word of the disaster at 0436 on the morning of 8 September 1934. She hurriedly recalled her liberty party, got up steam, and put out to sea at 1540. It took two hours to reach the scene of the holocaust, but when she arrived, Tampa assumed direction of the rescue operations which, by that time, were already well underway. Surfboats from the U.S. Coast Guard's Shark River Station – the first help to arrive – had rescued some 120 people before the New York pilot boat and boats from the Sandy Hook Station appeared and joined in the effort. The cutter USCGC Cahoone had also been on station for some time.

Tampa passed a towline to the stricken ship, but it soon parted with the sharp crack of a pistol shot and fouled the cutter's screw. Tampa herself drifted perilously close to shore before the cutter USCGC Sebago towed her out of danger. When conducted in smooth seas, operations to save lives are difficult enough; the gale raging off the New Jersey shore on the morning of 8 September 1934 made matters markedly worse. Nevertheless, the Coast Guardsmen performed feats of great heroism in rescuing the liner's passengers and crew from the storm-tossed waves. During the rescue, Tampa had accounted for 140 survivors.

Shifted to Mobile, Alabama, in the late 1930s, Tampa operated in the Gulf of Mexico into 1941.

=== World War II service ===
She came under U.S. Navy command in November 1941, a month before Japan attacked Pearl Harbor. Apparently transferred back to the North Atlantic for coastal convoy escort runs in the Greenland area, Tampa departed Narsarssuak, Greenland, on 3 May 1942 to escort the merchantman Chatham to the Cape Cod Canal. The ships stopped briefly at St. John's, Newfoundland, and then pushed on toward the Massachusetts coast. Tampa lost track of Chatham in dense fog on the 16th but regained contact near the eastern entrance of the canal and safely conducted the merchantman on her way. Tampa then searched, unsuccessfully, for a German U-boat reported in the vicinity before she put into Boston on the 17th.

She remained there for repairs and alterations until the 30th when she sailed for Argentia, Newfoundland. While escorting SS Montrose, Tampa picked up a sound contact and dropped depth charges but could not claim a "kill." On 3 June, Montrose ran aground on Moratties Reef. Tampa, assisted by two naval vessels, soon floated the merchantman free; and the cutter continued her escort mission, routed onward to Greenland. Arriving at Sondrestrom fjord on the 10th, Tampa conducted harbor entrance patrols before proceeding to Ivigtut. There, she guarded the cryolite mine—which provided ore vitally needed for the production of aluminum—from the 16th to the 26th.

During the last half of 1942, Tampa – designated WPG-48 in or around February 1942 – conducted 12 more convoy escort missions between Iceland, Greenland, and Nova Scotia. She left Argentia on 1 January 1943 with USCGC Tahoma, bound for St. John's where she arrived soon thereafter. Moored until the 6th, Tampa then got underway to escort a convoy routed to Greenland and then screened two groups of merchantmen—GS-18 and ON 161—to Newfoundland.

On 29 January, she got underway, with USCGC Escanaba and USCGC Comanche, to escort Convoy SG-19, which consisted of Army transport SS Dorchester and merchantman SS Biscaya and SS Lutz to Greenland. Bad weather soon hampered the convoy's progress; and the flank escorts, Comanche and Escanaba, soon had difficulties keeping station. Icing had increased their displacement and reduced their speed accordingly. This fact, in turn, slowed the whole convoy. By 2 February, the weather had somewhat improved; but a radio direction finder had discovered the presence of an enemy submarine. Tampa accordingly screened ahead, some 3,000 yards from Dorchester, while Escanaba and Comanche were deployed on each flank, 5,400 yards from Lutz and Biscaya, respectively.

Convoy SG-19 soon came into the periscope sight of German submarine U-223, which maneuvered astern to bring her tubes to bear. The U-boat torpedoed Dorchester astern at 0355. Tampa observed the transport veering hard to port and showing numerous small lights. Biscaya quickly fired two green signal rockets and executed an emergency turn to avoid fouling the mortally stricken Dorchester.

Three minutes after Dorchester had been struck, her master ordered her abandoned. As the ship went down, four Army chaplains gave up their life jackets to soldiers who had none to ensure the survival of others at the expense of themselves. Meanwhile, Escanaba and Comanche searched for U-223, while Tampa escorted Lutz and Biscaya to Skovfjord before returning to assist in the hunt for survivors. Tampa subsequently searched for survivors on the 4th, but sighted only numerous bodies; two swamped lifeboats manned only by corpses; and seven life rafts. She found no signs of life before she returned to Narsarssuak on 6 February.

Tampa resumed convoy operations, performing local escort in the Greenland area for the remainder of February 1943. She continued these operations through the spring. On 12 June 1943, she departed Narsarssuak with four other escorts, escorting a three-ship convoy for Argentia. The next day, at 0508, she observed smoke on the horizon, and received a report that Escanaba was afire. In fact, Escanaba had been blown to bits by an explosion of undetermined origin. Only three survivors were picked up by USCGC Raritan, and one of these died. The other two could not explain what had destroyed their ship.

Tampa escorted convoys for the remainder of 1943 before returning to Boston on the last day of the year for an overhaul which extended through January 1944. She resumed convoy escort operations in the North Atlantic, between Boston and Greenland—primarily in the Argentia and Narsarssuak vicinities—and continued the task through 1944 and into 1945.

=== Post war service and fate ===
With the cessation of hostilities in Europe in May 1945, Tampa resumed ice patrols off the Grand Banks in June through August, alternating with USCGC Modoc and USCGC Mojave. Leaving Argentia on 6 September 1945, less than a month after the war against Japan ended, Tampa operated between there and Boston, receiving a 30-day availability at the Coast Guard yard in Boston in November and December.

Tampa subsequently cruised on North Atlantic ice patrol duties into August 1946. She was decommissioned on 1 February 1947. The former Tampa was turned over to the Maritime Commission's War Shipping Administration which sold her to Charles M. Barnett, Jr., on 22 September 1947.

The name was taken on 27 May 1947 by the former USCGC Saranac of 1930 that had served during the war as HMS Banff (Y 43) and later as the Coast Guard's Sebec commissioned Tampa (WPG-164).
