= German weather ship WBS 6 Kehdingen =

Kriegsmarine auxiliary ship

History

Germany
- Name: Volkswohl (1929–39); Kehdingen (1939–44)
- Owner: Deutsche Hochsee Fischerei Bremen-Cuxhaven AG (1929–33); German Government (1933–39); Kriegsmarine (1939–44)
- Operator: Deutsche Hochsee Fischerei Bremen-Cuxhaven AG (1929–33); Reichsministerium für Ernührung und Landwirtschaft (1933–39); Kriegsmarine (1939–44)
- Port of registry: (Weimar Republic) Cuxhaven, Germany (1929-35); (Nazi Germany) Cuxhaven, Germany (1935–29); (Nazi Germany) Kriegsmarine (1939–44)
- Builder: Deutsche Werke AG
- Yard number: 208
- Launched: 23 March 1929
- Completed: December 1929
- Identification: Code Letters RHMJ (1929–34); Code Letters DIFL (1934-39)
- Fate: Scuttled, 1 September 1944

General characteristics
- Tonnage: 493 GRT, 188 NRT
- Length: 48.92 metres (160 ft 6 in)
- Beam: 8.74 metres (28 ft 8 in)
- Depth: 4.34 metres (14 ft 3 in)
- Installed power: Diesel engine, 209 nhp
- Propulsion: Single screw propeller
- Complement: 25, plus 10 meteorologists (WWII)

Kehdingen was a fishing trawler that was built in 1929 as Volkswohl. She was renamed Kehdingen in 1938 and was requisitioned by the Kriegsmarine in 1939. She served until 1944 when she was scuttled off the east coast of Greenland.

== Description ==
The ship was 48.92 metres (160 ft 6 in) long, with a beam of 8.74 metres (28 ft 8 in). She had a depth of 4.34 metres (14 ft 3 in). The ship was powered by a 4-cylinder two stroke, single cycle single action diesel engine rated at 209 nhp. It was manufactured by Deutsche Werke AG, Kiel. The engine drove a single screw propeller.

== History ==
Volkswohl was built in 1929 as yard number 208 by Deutsche Werke AG, Kiel for the Nordsee Deutsche Hochsee Fischerei Bremen-Cuxhaven AG. She was launched on 23 March 1929 and completed in December 1929. Her port of registry was Cuxhaven and the Code Letters RHMJ were allocated. In 1933, she came under the ownership of the German Government and was placed under the management of Reichsministerium für Ernährung und Landwirtschaft. With the change of Code Letters in 1934, she was allocated the letters DIFL. In 1938, she was renamed Kehdingen.

In 1939, Kehdingen was requisitioned by the Kriegsmarine. She was converted to a weather ship and entered service as WBS 6 Kehdingen in 1942. On 7 September, Kehdingen departed from Kristiansand, Norway escorted by U-703 for Operation Edelweiss. On 1 September 1944, Kehdingen was intercepted in the Arctic ocean off Great Coldeyey Island, Greenland (76°30′N 19°02′W) by the Greenland Patrol USCGC Northland. Her crew destroyed secret paperwork, scuttled her and surrendered. An attempted attack on USCGC Northland by U-703 was unable to be made due to the ice.
