= USCGC Escanaba (WPG-77) =

Coordinates: 60°50′N 52°0′W

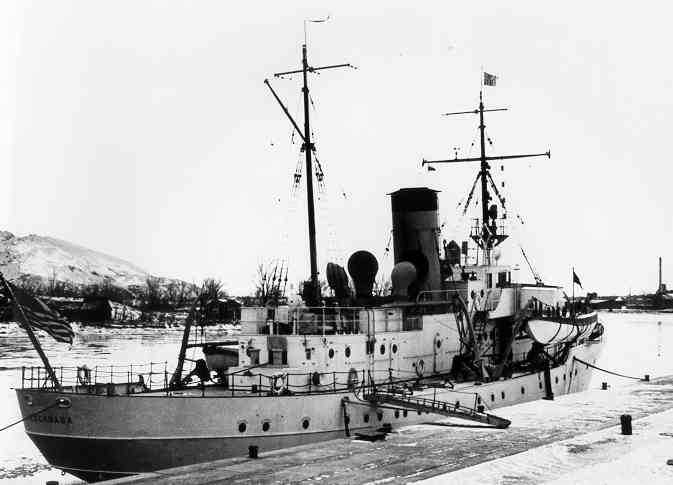
- Escanaba before World War II

History

United States
- Name: Escanaba
- Namesake: Escanaba, Michigan
- Ordered: 10 November 1931
- Builder: Defoe Shipbuilding Company, Bay City, Michigan
- Launched: 17 September 1932
- Commissioned: 23 November 1932
- Identification: Hull number: WPG-77
- Fate: Sunk 13 June 1943

General characteristics
- Class & type: A-class cutter
- Displacement: 1,005 long tons (1,021 t)
- Length: 165 ft (50 m)
- Beam: 36 ft (11 m)
- Draft: 12 ft (3.7 m)
- Speed: 12.8 kn (23.7 km/h; 14.7 mph)
- Range: 5,079 mi (8,174 km)
- Complement: 105
- Armament: 2 × 3-inch/50; 2 × 20 mm/80 (single mount); 2 × depth charge tracks; 4 × "Y" guns; 2 × mousetraps

USCGC Escanaba (WPG-77) was a 165 ft (50 m) A type United States Coast Guard cutter stationed on the Great Lakes from her commissioning in 1932 until the start of U.S. military involvement in World War II in 1941. With the outbreak of war, Escanaba redeployed to participate in the Battle of the Atlantic, during the course of which she was ultimately lost with nearly her entire crew. Struck by either a torpedo or mine in the early morning of 13 June 1943, while serving as a convoy escort, Escanaba suffered a fiery explosion and sank within minutes, leaving only two survivors and one body out of her 105-man crew to be found on the surface by rescuers.

== Construction ==
Escanaba was built at Bay City, Michigan by the Defoe Shipbuilding Company with contract for her construction signed 10 November 1931 at a cost of $525,550 (equivalent to $8,700,000 in 2024). She was one of six 165 ft (50 m) "A" type cutters designed as a light icebreaker and her type were the first United States Coast Guard cutters to have a geared-turbine drive. The double-reduction De Laval geared turbine was powered by two Babcock & Wilcox main boilers which produced 1,500 shaft horsepower (1,100 kW). The ship carried 41,500 US gallons (157,000 L; 34,600 imp gal) of oil to fire her boilers.

== Great Lakes service ==
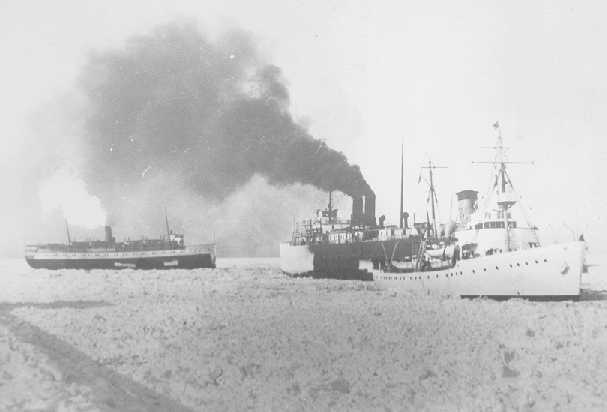
Escanaba (right) breaks ice for two merchant vessels on the Great Lakes in the mid-1930s

Escanaba, named for the city and river in the Upper Peninsula of Michigan, was built at the Defoe Shipbuilding Company in Bay City, Michigan in 1932. The six cutters of her class were designed primarily for light ice breaking, rescue, and law enforcement duties. She was commissioned on 23 November 1932 in Grand Haven, Michigan, which would be her permanent station and home port until she was redeployed to the East Coast for combat duty in the Second World War. Escanaba's primary, pre-war missions were ice breaking and search and rescue on the Great Lakes, which caused her to become well known throughout the region and a beloved part of her home port's community. During this period, from 1932 to 1934, future USCG Commandant Edwin J. Roland served aboard Escanaba as gunnery officer and navigator.

In the winter of 1934, Escanaba rescued the crew of the lake freighter SS Henry Cort after it ran aground at Muskegon.

== World War II ==
=== Greenland Patrol service ===
With the outbreak of war in 1941, Escanaba's home port was shifted to Boston, and she was assigned to the Greenland Patrol, performing escort duty and search and rescue operations in the North Atlantic.

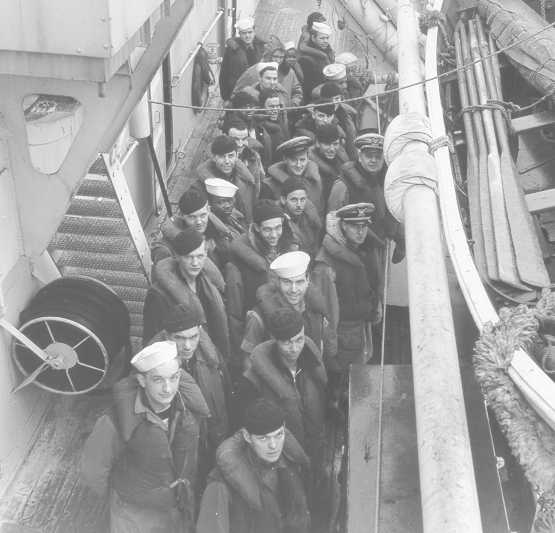
"All hands at Quarters on deck;" circa late 1942

On 15 June 1942, while escorting convoy XB-25 from Cape Cod to Halifax, Nova Scotia, Escanaba had two submarine contacts and made attacks on them. No sinkings were confirmed. After making these attacks, the ship rescued 20 people from SS Cherokee, which had been sunk by a U-boat. In that same month, Escanaba was credited with the sinkings of two enemy submarines in a single day. However, German records show no U-boats were sunk.

From 1 July until 23 August 1942, she was on weather patrol.

=== SS Dorchester rescues ===
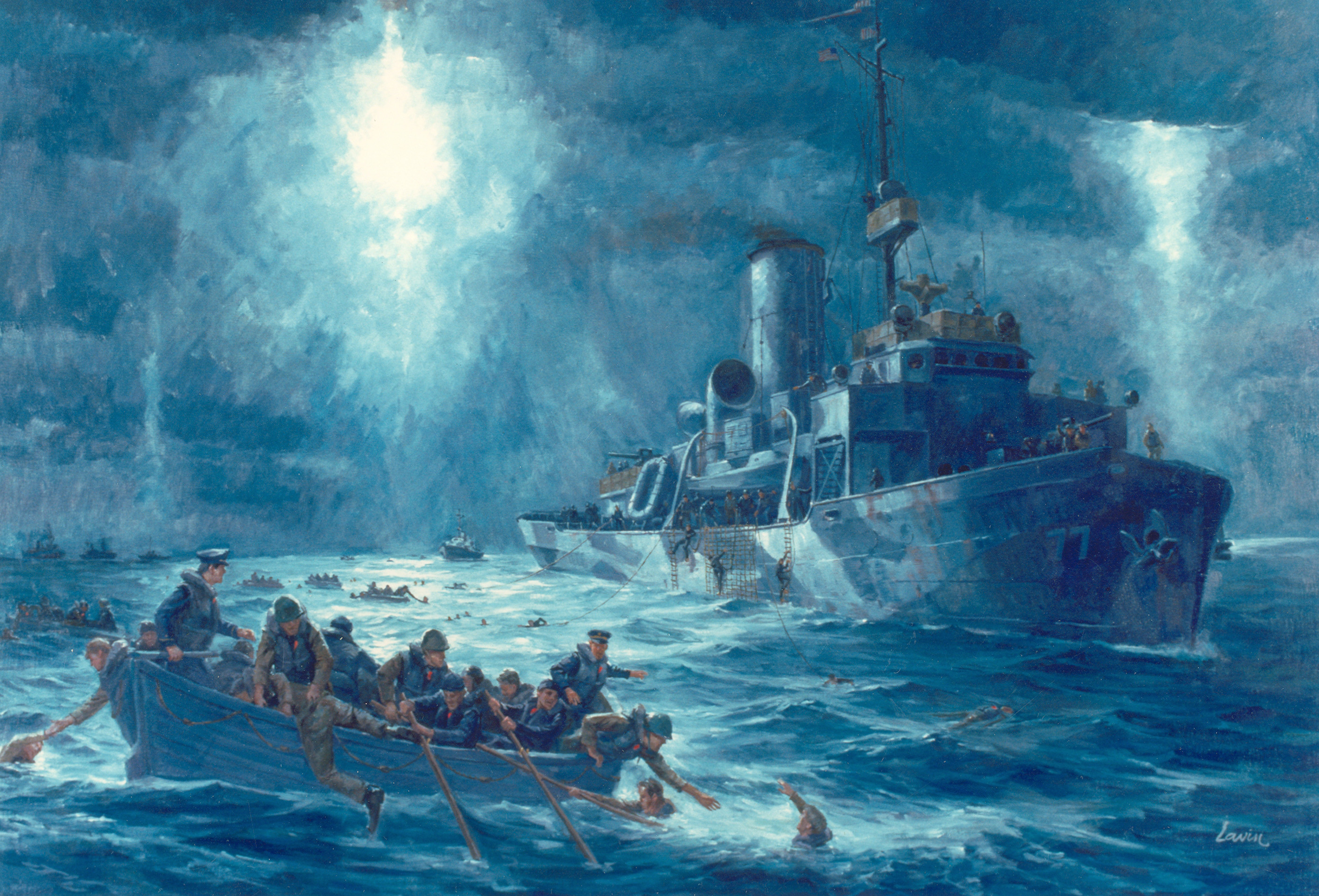
Escanaba rescuing the survivors of SS Dorchester in the predawn darkness of 3 February 1943.

On 3 February 1943, Escanaba participated in the rescue of the survivors of SS Dorchester, which had been torpedoed by a German submarine. The rescue was marked by the Escanaba's historic first use of rescue swimmers clad in survival suits to aid survivors, who were too weakened by shock or hypothermia in the icy water to pull themselves up cargo nets or sea ladders to the safety and warmth of rescuers' ships, or even to hold on to ropes cast to them from the rescue vessel. By way of the lines the rescue swimmers tied around those who were having trouble helping themselves, many struggling survivors who -- debilitated by the cold -- would have otherwise died, were hauled aboard Escanaba by crewmen on deck. Even those in the water who appeared to be dead were harnessed by the retrieval swimmers and pulled aboard – it was found that only 12 of the 50 apparently dead victims thus brought aboard by the retrieval teams actually turned out to be dead. The rest proved themselves to be quite alive once given the benefit of warmth, dryness, and medical attention.

In all, Escanaba plucked 133 survivors from the water that day, only one of whom went on to die aboard the cutter after rescue. For their work in supervising and organizing the rescue, commanding officer Lieutenant Commander Carl U. Peterson received the Legion of Merit and executive officer Lieutenant Robert H. Prause Jr., whose experiments in a tethered rubber suit off a dock at Bluie West One had paved the way for this new "retriever method," received a letter of commendation. Ship's doctor Assistant Surgeon Ralph R. Nix of the US Public Health Service also received a letter of commendation for his work saving the lives of the critically chilled survivors. Three crew members who went "over the side" to bring in survivors, Ensign Richard A. Arrighi, Ship's Cook 2nd Class Forrest O. Rednour, and Steward's Mate 3rd Class Warren T. Deyampert, were awarded the Navy and Marine Corps Medal for their actions in the water. All decorations and commendations, however, were to be awarded posthumously.

=== Sinking of Escanaba ===
On 10 June 1943, Escanaba began escorting her last convoy, GS 24 from Narsarssuak to St. John's, Newfoundland, in company with Mojave (Flag), Tampa, Storis, and Algonquin. The vessels they were tasked to escort were USAT Fairfax and the tug USS Raritan.

At 0510 on 13 June, a large sheet of flame and dense smoke were seen rising from Escanaba, though no explosion was heard by the other ships in the convoy. She sank at 0513, going down so quickly that she did not have time to send any distress signals. Storis and Raritan were ordered to investigate and rescue survivors while the rest of the convoy began zigzagging and steering evasive courses to avoid enemy submarines. Although Storis and Raritan were able to arrive on the scene within ten minutes, only two survivors and one body could be found. At 0715 the two vessels returned to the main body of the convoy. The entire crew of 13 officers and 92 ratings was lost to the explosion or to rapid hypothermia in the 39 °F (4 °C) water with the exception of the two sailors who were recovered and whose survival was attributed to their soaked clothing having frozen their unconscious bodies to floating debris, which prevented them from following their shipmates to the bottom.

The exact cause of the explosion could not be determined at the time, but was commonly attributed to a torpedo fired by one of several U-boats which were in the area at the time. However, no U-boats claimed the kill, and, according to Browning, it is now considered more probable that the cutter was sunk by a drifting mine.

== Legacy ==
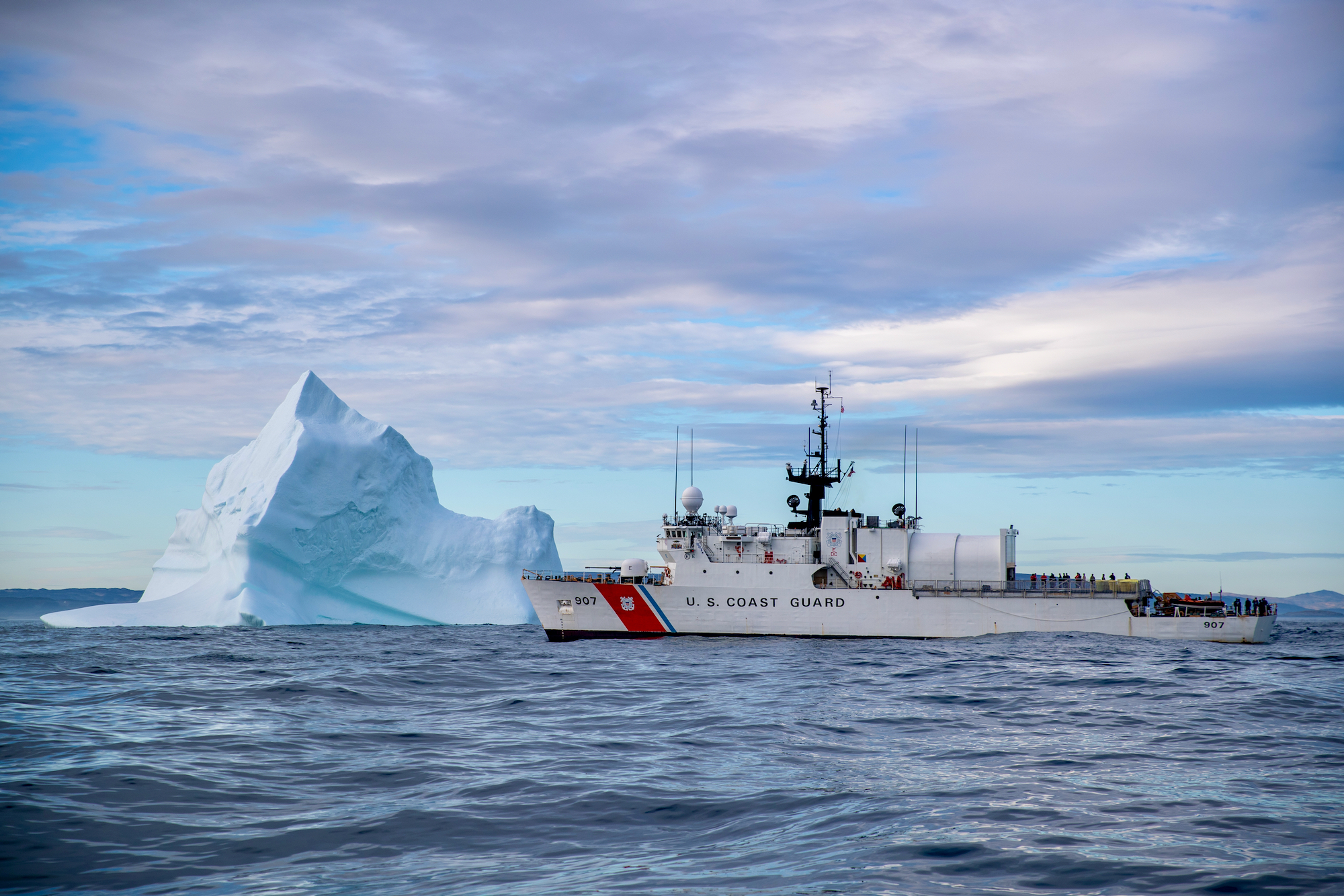
Escanaba in the Labrador Sea, 2021

The city of Grand Haven was hit hard emotionally by the loss of "its" cutter. As the war wore on, the citizens of Grand Haven managed to raise more than $1,000,000 in bonds to build a new cutter bearing the same name in order to honor the ill-fated ship and its men, equivalent to $14,456,000 in 2024. The third Escanaba (WMEC-907) was commissioned in 1987 and is based at Portsmouth, Virginia. In 1949, the Michigan city renamed Kelly Memorial Park to Escanaba Park to honor ship and her crew. Each year during the Grand Haven Coast Guard Festival, the city holds a memorial service to honor the sacrifice of the 103 men who were lost with Escanaba.
