= USS Albatross (AM-71) =

Minesweeper of the United States Navy

History

United States
- Name: USS Albatross
- Builder: Bath Iron Works, Bath, Maine
- Laid down: 25 October 1930
- Launched: 19 March 1931 as M/V Illinois
- Acquired: by the US Navy, 9 August 1940
- Commissioned: 8 November 1940
- Decommissioned: 11 September 1944
- Renamed: USS Albatross, 14 August 1940
- Reclassified: IX-171 (Unclassified Miscellaneous Auxiliary), 1 June 1944
- Stricken: 23 September 1944
- Fate: Transferred to the Maritime Commission, 15 November 1944

General characteristics
- Class & type: Albatross-class minesweeper
- Displacement: 510 long tons (518 t)
- Length: 147 ft 5 in (44.93 m)
- Beam: 25 ft (7.6 m)
- Draft: 12 ft (3.7 m)
- Propulsion: Fairbanks-Morse diesel engine, 550 shp (410 kW); 1 shaft
- Speed: 13 knots (24 km/h; 15 mph)
- Armament: 1 × 3"/50 caliber gun mount

USS Albatross (AM-71) was an Albatross-class minesweeper of the United States Navy during World War II.

Originally laid down on 25 October 1930 as the steel-hulled fishing trawler MV Illinois by the Bath Iron Works, Bath, Maine, she was launched on 19 March 1931 and delivered on 30 March 1931 to the Booth Fisheries Company, Boston, Massachusetts.

Acquired by the U.S. Navy on 9 August 1940 and renamed Albatross on 14 August 1940, conversion to a minesweeper began on 6 September 1940 by the General Ship and Engine Works, East Boston, Massachusetts. The ship was commissioned as USS Albatross (AM-71) on 8 November 1940 at the Boston Navy Yard. Conversion was completed on 8 November 1941. She was reclassified as an Unclassified Miscellaneous Auxiliary, IX-171, 1 June 1944.

== Service history ==
=== World War II North Atlantic operations ===
Following her conversion for naval service as a minesweeper Albatross was assigned to duty in the 5th Naval District. In early May 1941, she sailed to Bermuda, arriving at Port Royal Bay on 9 May. The ship operated in Bermudan waters until 15 August, when she got underway for Norfolk, Virginia. After a period of upkeep, she returned to her minesweeping activities in the Hampton Roads area. On 12 December, she set sail for Newfoundland, arriving at Argentia, Newfoundland, on 23 December 1941.

=== Iceland Area operations ===
Albatross left that port on 4 January 1942 in company with USS Linnet to join a British convoy bound for Iceland. En route to the rendezvous, the ships encountered heavy weather which forced them to change their course; and they reached Derry, Northern Ireland, on 16 January. Although Albatross had sustained minor damage, she was sent to Iceland via northern Scotland, Orkney, Shetland, and Faroe Islands. The minesweeper finally returned to the United States in July, when she arrived at the Boston Navy Yard. She left Boston as an escort for a convoy on 1 October and reached Greenland on 21 October. Albatross spent the remainder of the year in waters around Greenland.

=== Albatross strikes an iceberg ===
USS Albatross struck an iceberg on 7 January 1943, causing minor damage. Then an ice pack formed astern of the ship, blocking the ship's path until shifting winds cleared the ice, enabling her to leave Greenland on 12 January. She touched at Newfoundland on 3 February and then proceeded on to Boston, Massachusetts, arriving on the 8th. Albatross reached Norfolk, Virginia, on the 11th. After a month's overhaul, she got underway for Canada.

=== Collision with another ship ===
On 11 April, while operating out of Nova Scotia, Albatross was struck by another ship and suffered damage which caused her to return to Boston, Massachusetts, for a drydock period. When this was completed, the minesweeper returned to Greenland to resume her convoy duties.

=== Stranded in Greenland ===
Albatross spent the first six months of 1944 moored to the pier at Narsarssuak, Greenland, awaiting repairs to her main engine which were held up for lack of spare parts. While she was thus immobilized, she provided repairs and services to other ships. On 1 June, Albatross was redesignated IX-171. When her engine was finally back in working order, she headed home and arrived at Boston, Massachusetts, on 14 July. Then the minesweeper reported to the 1st Naval District for inactivation.

=== End-of-War decommissioning ===
Stripped of her military equipment, she was decommissioned on 11 September, and her name was struck from the Navy list on 23 September 1944. Albatross was transferred to the Maritime Commission on 15 November 1944 for disposal. She then resumed the name MV Illinois, but no record of her subsequent career has been found.
