= Albatross-class minesweeper (1940) =

Class overview
- Builders: Bath Iron Works, Bath, Maine
- Operators: United States Navy
- In commission: 8 November 1940–12 January 1945
- Completed: 2

General characteristics
- Type: Minesweeper
- Displacement: 510 long tons (518 t)
- Length: 147 ft 5 in (44.93 m)
- Beam: 25 ft (7.6 m)
- Draft: 12 ft (3.7 m)
- Propulsion: Fairbanks-Morse diesel engine, 550 shp (410 kW); 1 shaft
- Speed: 13 knots (24 km/h; 15 mph)
- Armament: 1 × 3"/50 caliber gun mount

The Albatross class was a class of minesweepers acquired by the United States Navy during World War II.

== Ships ==
- USS Albatross (AM-71)
- USS Bluebird (AM-72)
