= USCGC Modoc =

United States Coast Guard cutter

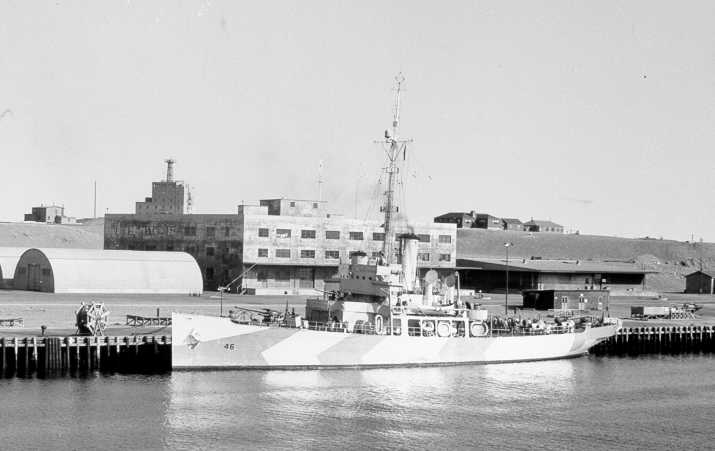
- USCGC Modoc (WPG-46) at Naval Station Argentia in Newfoundland c. 1941-45.

History

United States
- Namesake: Modoc Tribe
- Builder: Union Construction Company, Oakland
- Yard number: 19
- Laid down: 19 April 1921
- Launched: 1 October 1921
- Sponsored by: Jean Lemard
- Commissioned: 14 January 1922
- Decommissioned: 1 February 1947
- Fate: Scrapped by Ecuador in 1964

General characteristics
- Displacement: 1,506 tons
- Length: 240 ft (73.2 m)
- Beam: 39 ft (11.9 m)
- Draft: 13 ft 2 in (4.0 m)
- Propulsion: 2 x Babcock & Wilcox, cross-drum type, 200 psi (1,400 kPa), 750 °F (399 °C) superheat boilers, turbo-electric transmission
- Complement: 12 officers, 78 enlisted (1930); 12 officers, 110 enlisted (1945)
- Sensors & processing systems: SF-1, SC-3
- Armament: 2 × 5"/51 guns (1922); 1 × 3"/50 gun (1922); 2 × 6-pounder guns (1922)

USCGC Modoc (WPG-46) was a 240-foot Tampa-class United States Coast Guard cutter designed for multi-mission roles. She had a top speed of sixteen knots, and was armed with a pair of 5-inch deck guns. With the breakout of war she was armed with depth charges, additional guns, sonar, and radar and transferred to the Navy. Modoc, along with her sister ships Mojave and Tampa joined the Greenland Patrol.

The ship is most remembered for her role in the sinking of the German battleship Bismarck. According to British intelligence chief William Stephenson's biography, A Man Called Intrepid, Modoc was rescuing survivors from torpedoed convoys in the Bay of Biscay when she came into visual contact with Bismarck which hitherto had been lost to pursuing British forces. Based upon her position, a PBY patrol bomber from RAF's 209 Squadron went on to locate Bismarck in time for HMS Ark Royal to launch the air attacks that ultimately disabled her and enabled the British fleet to catch up and sink her. Modoc ended up in the middle of the battle. Anti-aircraft fire from Bismarck came close to hitting the ship. In addition, HMS Norfolk was about to fire on the cutter when HMS Prince of Wales identified her as US Coast Guard. Despite all of the hectic action around the ship, she survived the encounter and the war.

Modoc was returned to the Treasury Department in December 1945, and served as a patrol cutter until decommissioning in 1947. She was sold to a private owner and was converted to a merchant ship steaming Central and South American waters. After changing hands several times, Modoc was finally scrapped in 1964.

== History ==
Modoc was launched as a Coast Guard cutter by Union Construction Company in Oakland, California on 1 October 1921. She was sponsored by Jean Lemard. Modoc was placed in commission on 14 January 1922. She was one of four Tampa-class 240-foot cutters, the others being Haida, Mojave, and Tampa. These were the first USCG vessels with turbo-electric transmission and were the largest and most advanced cutters for their time.

Home ported at Wilmington, North Carolina, Modoc began Atlantic ice patrol service with the International Ice Patrol in 1923. For much of the next 18 years, she and another cutter alternated on 15-day patrols off the Grand Banks, using Halifax, Nova Scotia, and Boston as their bases.

Modoc, in company with cutters Northland and General Greene rescuing survivors from torpedoed convoy ships, also witnessed a large part of the German battleship Bismarck's last battle during 23 to 27 May 1941. Close to midnight on 24 May Modoc found herself in the midst of an attack in which eight planes and three warships were involved. Antiaircraft fire from Bismarck whizzed dangerously close to the cutter's port bow. HMS Norfolk was about to take the cutter under fire until HMS Prince of Wales identified her as U.S. Coast Guard. The cutter was undamaged, although they were near the fighting and at times only six miles from Bismarck. The widespread movements of the combatants, 19 plus destroyers and smaller ships, had distributed danger over a wide area. Aircraft had played a continuous part in coordinating activities, thus adding to the danger of accidents to innocent bystanders, a role the cutters had to play prior to Pearl Harbor.

Transferred to the United States Navy by Executive Order No. 8029 of 1 November 1941, Modoc joined the Greenland Patrol, whose orders were to do "a little of everything." This duty involved keeping convoy routes open, breaking and finding leads in ice for the Greenland convoys, escorting the convoys and rescuing survivors from torpedoed ships, constructing and maintaining aids to navigation, and reporting weather conditions. Ships of the patrol were also expected to discover and destroy enemy weather and radio stations in Greenland, continue hydrographic surveys, maintain communications, deliver supplies, and conduct search and rescue operations. All of these duties, the Coast Guard performed with exemplary fortitude and faithfulness throughout the war. It was during this time that she was designated as WPG-46.

On the Greenland Ice Patrol plodded many of the Coast Guard's older, smaller, and slower ships. They endured much discomfort amid the dangers of fog, storms, ice, and German raiders, but their work was vital to victory in the Atlantic.

In both World Wars, when submarines were more of a menace than icebergs, the International Ice Patrol was suspended so that the cutters could perform more important escort duty. During these years there was but one major collision; British ship Svend Foyne struck a berg 21 January 1943. Before she sank, Modoc rescued 128 survivors.

Modoc returned to the Treasury Department in accordance with Executive Order No. 9666 of 28 December 1945, and served as a patrol cutter until decommissioning in 1947. Sold to Manuel Velliantis in Honduras, she was converted for merchant use and renamed Amalia V. Registered in Ecuador in 1960 by Tropical Navigation Co., she was renamed Machala, and served as a merchantman until scrapped in 1964.

== Honors and awards ==
- American Defense Service Medal with "A" device
- American Campaign Medal
- European–African–Middle Eastern Campaign Medal with one battle star for World War II service
- World War II Victory Medal
