= USCGC Raritan =

Tugboat of the United States Coast Guard

History

United States
- Name: USCGC Raritan
- Namesake: A branch of the Delaware Indian tribe first found near what today is Youngstown, Ohio.
- Owner: U.S. Coast Guard
- Builder: Defoe Boat Works, Bay City, Michigan
- Cost: US$309,000
- Launched: 23 March 1939
- Commissioned: 11 April 1939
- Decommissioned: 14 May 1988
- Fate: Scrapped

General characteristics
- Type: 110 foot tug
- Displacement: 328 tons (1945)
- Length: 110 ft (34 m)
- Beam: 26 ft 5 in (8.05 m)
- Draft: 12 ft (3.7 m) (1945)
- Installed power: 1 × Westinghouse electric motor with 2 x Westinghouse generators; powered by 2 x 8-567A GM diesels, 1,000 SHP
- Propulsion: single screw
- Speed: 11.2 knots (20.75 km/h)
- Complement: 2 warrant officers, 14 enlisted (1945), 1 warrant, 19 enlisted (1961)
- Sensors & processing systems: SO-8 (1945); SPN-11 (1961)
- Armament: 1 x 20mm/80 gun (1945)

USCGC Raritan (WYT-93/WYTM-93) was a United States Coast Guard 110 ft (34 m) harbor tug that was in service from 1939 to 1988. She served on the Greenland Patrol during World War II and after the war on the Great Lakes. From 1980 until decommissioning she was homeported at Governors Island.

== Construction ==
Raritan was built for the Coast Guard by Defoe Boat Works, Bay City, Michigan, at a cost of US$309,000 and was launched alongside her sister cutter Naugatuck on 23 March 1939, the first dual launching to ever take place in Bay City. She was one of four Arundel-type 110 foot light icebreaking tugs built in 1939, the design of which was taken from the successful 1934 Calumet-type 110 foot tug design. Raritan was capable of breaking ice up to 3 ft (0.91 m) thick. After commissioning on 11 April 1939, she was assigned harbor duties at Boston, Massachusetts.

== History ==
=== World War II ===
Germany invaded Denmark on 9 April 1940 and then laid claim to Denmark's crown colony, Greenland. The U.S. State Department immediately began negotiations with Henrik Kauffmann, the Danish government-in-exile representative in Washington, D.C. and Eske Brun, the Governor of Greenland to preserve Greenland's sovereignty. An agreement was reached on 3 May where Greenland requested U.S. protection. Because of the Coast Guard's experience with the International Ice Patrol and because it operated the only ships that were equipped to handle ice conditions in Greenland waters, the State Department requested Coast Guard assistance in enforcing claims of sovereignty and to prevent Germany from taking control of the cryolite mines at Ivittuut and establishing weather stations on the Eastern coastline. (Note: Cryolite is a mineral that was used in the production of aluminum prior to World War II. Aluminum was used extensively in wartime aircraft production. Control of the cryolite mines gave the United States one of the few sources in the world for cryolite and denied Germany the mine production.) In August, Raritan along with the cutters Duane, Modoc, and Northland joined Ice Patrol cutters Comanche and Campbell as the first cutters assigned to the Greenland Patrol.

Raritan was transferred to U.S. Navy control on 1 November 1941 by Executive Order 8929 which transferred the entire Coast Guard from the United States Department of the Treasury to the United States Navy. Raritan continued to be homeported at Boston under U.S. Navy control but was manned by Coast Guard personnel.

=== Post-war service ===
After the Coast Guard was returned to the Treasury Department on 1 January 1946 in accordance with Executive Order 9666, Raritan continued to operate in Boston Harbor. She was subsequently transferred to Portsmouth, Virginia. and in 1962 she was assigned to the Great Lakes and her home port was Grand Haven, Michigan.

Raritan was decommissioned from Coast Guard service on 14 May 1988.

== Notes ==
=== References used ===
- "Raritan, 1939". Cutters, Craft & U.S. Coast Guard-Manned Army & Navy Vessels. U.S. Coast Guard Historian's Office.
- Scheina, Robert L. (1982). U.S. Coast Guard Cutters & Craft of World War II. Naval Institute Press, Annapolis, Maryland. ISBN 978-0-87021-717-3.
- Scheina, Robert L. (1990). U.S. Coast Guard Cutters & Craft, 1946–1990. Naval Institute Press, Annapolis, Maryland. ISBN 978-0-87021-719-7.
- Walling, Michael G. (2004). Bloodstained Sea: the U.S. Coast Guard in the Battle of the Atlantic, 1941–1944. International Marine/McGraw-Hill, Camden, Maine. ISBN 978-0-07-142401-1.
