= USCGC Mohawk (WPG-78) =

U.S. Coast Guard cutter sunk as artificial reef off south-west Florida

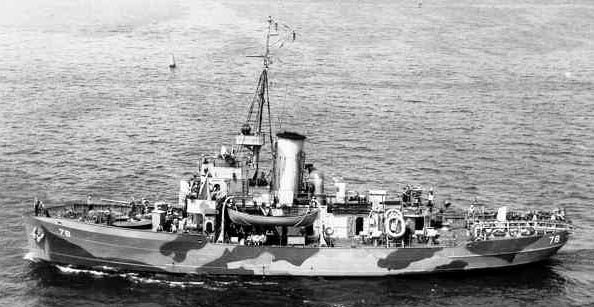
- USCGC Mohawk (WPG-78) during WWII

History

United States
- Name: USCGC Mohawk
- Namesake: The Mohawk Native American tribe
- Builder: Pusey & Jones Shipbuilders, Wilmington, Delaware
- Cost: $499,800
- Laid down: 1933
- Launched: 1 October 1934
- Sponsored by: Miss Ann Gibbons (daughter of the assistant secretary of the treasury, Steven Gibbons)
- Commissioned: 19 January 1935
- Decommissioned: 8 January 1946
- In service: 1935
- Out of service: 1946
- Stricken: 1948
- Home port: Cape May, New Jersey, later Boston Mass.
- Nickname(s): " Mighty MO"
- Fate: Sold 1 November 1948, Sunk as an artificial reef 2 July 2012
- Notes: Operated as a memorial museum

General characteristics
- Type: Patrol Gunboat
- Displacement: 1,005 tons
- Length: 165 feet
- Beam: 36 feet
- Draft: 12 foot 3 inches
- Ice class: ice breaking capabilities up to 2 feet
- Installed power: 1,500 shp
- Propulsion: 1× Westinghouse double-reduction geared turbine, 2× foster-wheeler 310 psi 200 deg superheat boilers
- Speed: 13.5 kt
- Range: (max speed=1,350 miles)(economic speed=5,079 miles)
- Crew: 124 enlisted 10 officers
- Sensors & processing systems: Radar SF (1945) Sonar QCJ-3 (1945)
- Armament: 2× 3" 50 cal deck guns. 2× "mouse trap" mortars. 2× depth charge racks. 10× "k" gun depth charge projectors. 2x 20mm anti aircraft guns in single mounts on bridge wings, 1 twin mount 20mm antiaircraft gun on fantail. 1 twin mount 50cal antiaircraft battery in a gun tub forward of bridge

The fifth United States Coast Guard Cutter named Mohawk (WPG-78) was built by Pusey & Jones Corp., Wilmington, Delaware, and launched 1 October 1934. She was commissioned on 19 January 1935.

== Active service ==
She was first assigned patrol and general icebreaking duties on the Hudson and Delaware Rivers, and the outbreak of war found her stationed at Cape May, New Jersey. In accordance with Executive Order No. 89-29 of 1 November 1941, the Coast Guard was directed to serve as part of the U.S. Navy. Mohawk was assigned to North Atlantic escort operations with the Greenland Patrol, where she served for the entire war, Mohawk launched a total of 14 attacks against submarine contacts between 27 August 1942 and 8 April 1945.

On the evening of 27 August 1942 the fleet oiler USS Laramie was torpedoed while steaming in convoy at the eastern end of Belle Isle Strait. Mohawk escorted Laramie into port at Sydney, Nova Scotia on 30 August 1942.

One of Mohawk's most famous deeds was being the last ship to radio General Dwight D. Eisenhower on the day before the Normandy invasion confirming that the weather was going to be clear enough to proceed. Unfortunately, she hit an iceberg shortly after the message was sent and sustained a hole in her side. After a temporary fix in Greenland, she returned to the United States for permanent repairs to the hull.

Mohawk also survived a friendly fire attack from British planes. While on patrol near Iceland, she was misidentified by British planes, which bombed her, damaging the main deck. She returned to Boston for emergency repairs.

=== Awards ===
- American Defense Service Medal
- American Campaign Medal
- European-African-Middle Eastern Campaign Medal
- World War II Victory Medal

== Post war ==
At the end of the War, she was transferred to her old homeport of Cape May, after her war-time armament was removed, she was stationed at Cape May, from 25 November until 5 January 1946, when she proceeded to New York on special duty. She returned to Cape May on 19 February 1946. On 6 April 1946 Mohawk was ordered to be placed "in reserve, in commission" status, with a skeleton crew, at Cape May, New Jersey.

There was some discussion of converting Mohawk and her sister cutters into lightships but this was eventually deemed to be impractical. On 8 October 1947 Mohawk was ordered to be decommissioned and placed in storage at the Coast Guard Yard.

She was declared "surplus to needs of CG" on 13 July 1948 and was put up for sale. She was sold on 1 November 1948 to the Delaware Bay and River Pilots' Association, and was used as a pilot boat on the Delaware River for more than 30 years.

In 1984 the Mohawk was purchased by Charles Weymouth of Wilmington, Delaware for $1.00 .The Mohawk was then repaired by a group of volunteers from the Delaware area. The USCG cutter Mohawk Museum was started in 1986 and ended in the late 1990s for unknown reasons In the late 1990s Mohawk was moved to Staten Island.

Mohawk was taken in ownership by Caribbean Transport Lines in lieu of back payment for mooring fees on Staten Island. The ship's plight was shared with the nation via the National Trust for Historic Preservation's Preservation911 Program in 2001.

== USS Mohawk CGC Memorial Museum ==
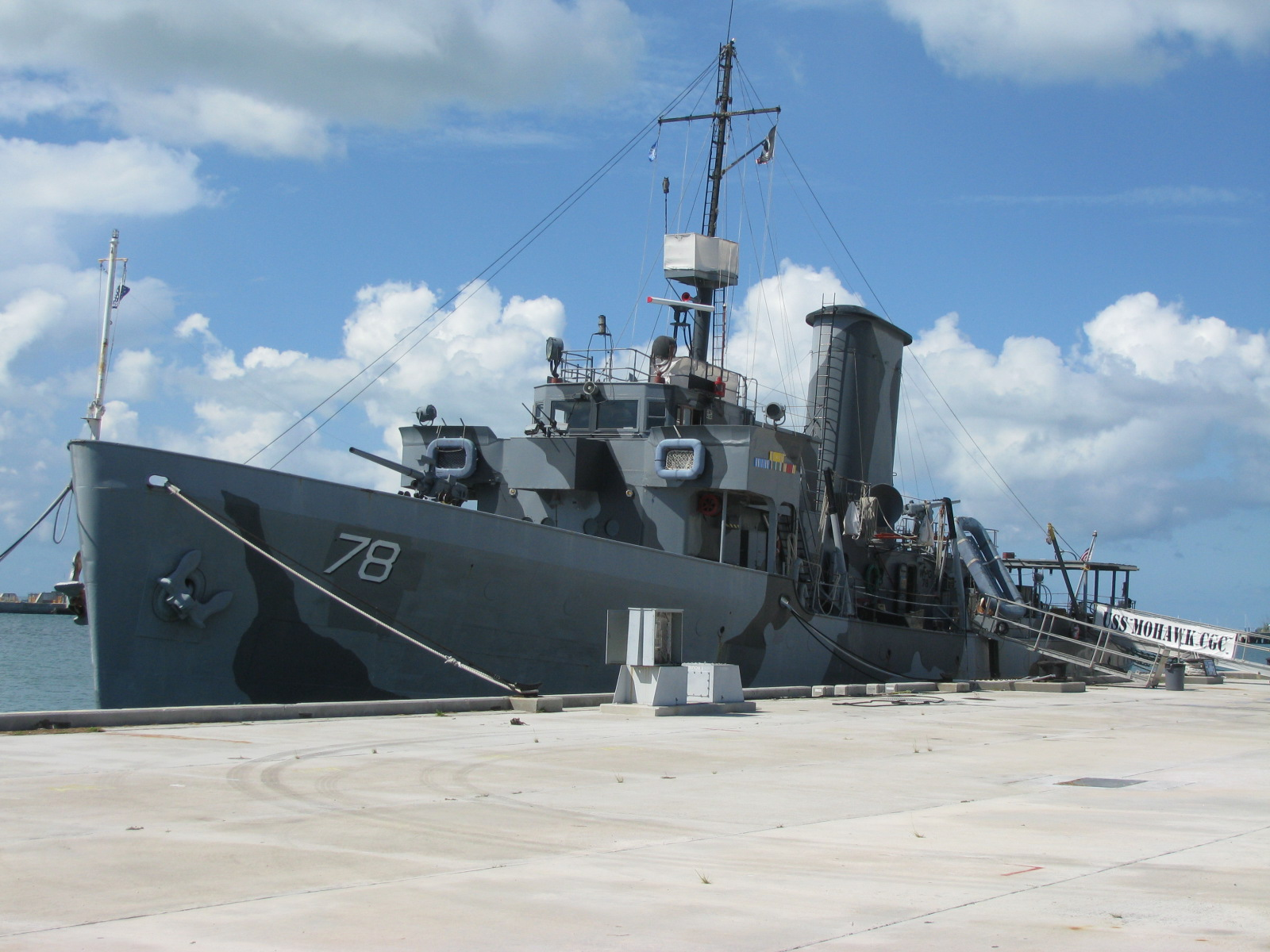

The USS Mohawk CGC Memorial Museum was founded by the Miami Dade Historical Maritime Museum. The ship was berthed in Key West, at Truman Waterfront.

Mohawk was found in a Staten Island scrap yard by Frans Boetes, then president and CEO of Mohawk’s Memorial Museum. She had been there rusting for over 15 years. After some initial repairs, she was towed to Miami, where substantial repairs were made, and on to Key West where she was berthed at the inner quay wall, at the old Navy pier in the Truman Waterfront.

In 2012, the museum was reluctantly forced to either scrap Mohawk or sink her as an artificial reef due to a lack of funds necessary to recover her from her state of disrepair. It was ultimately decided that the most honorable fate was to give her a final duty serving as a veteran's memorial reef in lieu of the scrap yard, where she would have been melted down and sold.

== USS Mohawk CGC Veterans Memorial Reef ==
Starting May 16, 2012, "Mighty MO" was in port at Fort Myers Beach, FL, to be cleaned and getting ready to be scuttled 28 nautical miles off the coast of Captiva Island in its final service as a Veteran's Memorial artificial reef. She was sunk on July 2, 2012.

The Mohawk was the first dedicated veterans memorial military ship reef in the United States of America. The USS Mohawk CGC Veterans Memorial Reef was the brainchild of Mike Campbell with the Lee County Division of Natural Resources, and has made Southwest Florida a new diving destination.

Wreck location: 26°33.075′N 82°43.481′W
