= USCGC Mojave =

History

United States
- Name: USCGC Mojave (WPG-47)
- Namesake: Mojave
- Builder: Union Construction Company, Oakland, California
- Commissioned: 12 December 1921
- Decommissioned: 3 July 1947
- Honors and awards: 1 battle star (World War II)
- Fate: Sold, February 1948; Scrapped, 1964

General characteristics (1945)
- Class & type: Tampa-class cutter
- Displacement: 1,955 long tons (1,986 t)
- Length: 240 ft (73 m)
- Beam: 39 ft (12 m)
- Draft: 13 ft 2 in (4.01 m)
- Propulsion: 1 × General Electric 2.040 kVa motor with turbo generator; 2 × Babcock & Wilcox cross-drum 200 psi boilers; 1 × Propeller
- Speed: 15.5 knots (28.7 km/h; 17.8 mph)
- Range: 5,500 nmi (10,200 km; 6,300 mi) at 9 kn (17 km/h; 10 mph)
- Complement: 122
- Sensors & processing systems: SF-1 radar; SC-3 radar; QCL-2 sonar
- Armament: 1921: 2 × 5"/51 caliber guns; 2 × 6-pounder guns; 1 × 1-pounder gun; 1942: 2 × 5"/51 caliber guns; 1 × 3"/50 caliber gun; 2 × .50 caliber machine guns; 4 × Y-gun depth charge projectors; 2 × depth charge tracks; 1945: 2 × 3"/50 caliber guns; 4 × 20 mm/80 guns; 2 × Mousetrap ASW; 4 × Y-gun depth charge projectors; 2 × depth charge tracks

USCGC Mojave (WPG-47) was a 240-foot Tampa-class United States Coast Guard cutter in commission from 1921 until 1947.

== Ship history ==
The ship was launched by the Union Construction Company of Oakland, California on 7 September 1921, sponsored by Miss Elizabeth Haske of Oakland. She was commissioned at Oakland on 12 December 1921 as one of a new class of four ships which introduced the new principle of turbo-electric transmission.

Assigned to a permanent station at Honolulu, she served with the Bering Sea Patrol, and assisted in enforcing the ban on deep-sea sealing. Upon completion of her Bering Sea tour Mojave transferred to Boston and, in company with the cutters Modoc and Tampa, took up Grand Banks ice patrol duties. (The fourth ship of the class, Haida, spent the war in Alaskan waters.)

Mojave and her sister ships were gradually replaced by the new class of 2,200-ton cutters in 1930, although Mojave continued to operate out of Boston until 1933. She also occasionally took part in Coast Guard operations against the rumrunners between 1925 and 1930.

Weather patrols were instituted in 1940, and Mojave assumed rotating duty in 1941 as one of the Atlantic Ocean observation stations. This duty involved 21-day patrols in areas 10 miles square between Bermuda and the Azores. Prior to 1940 merchant ships had provided weather observation reports, but these had been curtailed when the outbreak of war forced ships of belligerent nations into radio silence.

For this reason the cutters operating out of Boston were relieved of their usual patrol and cruising duties so as to assume full-time weather patrol. When the cutters were transferred to the Navy on 1 November 1941 the schedules of the weather patrol ships Mojave, Hamilton, Spencer, Bibb, and Duane were not affected.

Only when war developments increased demand for these large cutters elsewhere were they replaced by other, smaller craft taken over by the Coast Guard for such duties as weather patrol. By the end of the war there were 11 Coast Guard ocean stations in the Atlantic, acting as plane guards and radio beacons as well as weather reporters.

Mojave was assigned to the Greenland Patrol in 1942, where she took part in convoy escort and rescue operations. While acting as escort for the slow group of Convoy SG-6 which had departed Sydney, Nova Scotia on 25 August, she assisted in the rescue of 570 men from the torpedoed army transport USAT Chatham. The escort and anti-submarine accomplishments of the cutters were truly vital to the winning of the Battle of the Atlantic.

Returned to the U.S. Treasury Department in January 1946, Mojave was caught up in the postwar demobilization. She was decommissioned in 1947, and sold in February 1948.

Mojave received one battle star for World War II service.

In private ownership she was renamed Amelia V, renamed again as Machala in 1950, and finally scrapped in 1964.

== See also ==
- List of United States Coast Guard cutters
