= USCGC Tahoma (WPG-80) =

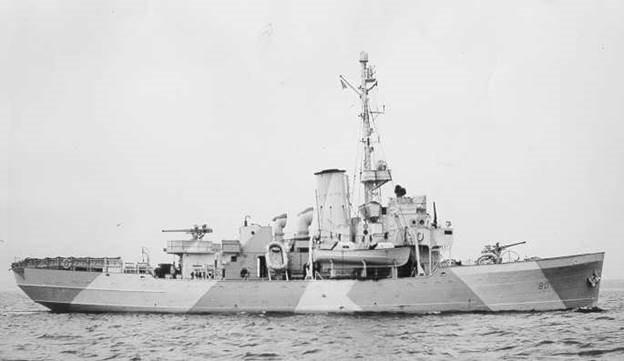
- USCGC Tahoma during World War II

History

United States
- Name: Tahoma
- Builder: Defoe Shipbuilding Company
- Launched: 5 September 1934
- Commissioned: 22 October 1934
- Decommissioned: 5 June 1953
- Fate: Sold for Scrap, 17 October 1955

General characteristics
- Displacement: 1005 tons
- Length: 165 ft (50 m)
- Beam: 36 ft (11 m)
- Draft: 13 ft 7 in (4.14 m)
- Speed: 13 kn (24 km/h; 15 mph)
- Complement: 105
- Armament: 2 x 3 inch guns

USCGC Tahoma (WPG-80) was a United States Coast Guard Cutter built by the Defoe Shipbuilding Company in Bay City, Michigan. Completed in 1934, the steel-hulled cutter operated on the Great Lakes between 1934 and 1941, attached to the 9th Coast Guard District and homeported at Cleveland, Ohio. She was named after the Tahoma Glacier on the western slope of Mount Rainier in the state of Washington.

As the United States moved closed to full participation in World War II, President Roosevelt issued an executive order on 1 November 1941 transferring the Coast Guard from the United States Treasury Department to the Navy. Accordingly, Tahoma was sometime thereafter reclassified as a gunboat and designated WPG-80.

By July 1942, the former cutter had left the Great Lakes to escort Allied convoys in the North Atlantic in the vicinity of Casco Bay, Maine; Ivigtut, Greenland; St. John's and Argentia, Newfoundland; and Sydney, Nova Scotia; into the spring of 1944. The remainder of her naval service was spent in serving on weather and ice patrol duties between Greenland and Iceland and plane guard operations in the same waters. In the latter service, she alternated with the Coast Guard cutters Frederick Lee (WPC-139), Algonquin (WPG-75), and Mohawk (WPG-78) into 1945. At the time of the Japanese surrender in mid-August 1945, Tahoma was at sea on a plane guard station.

Released from duty with the Atlantic Fleet on 30 September 1945, Tahoma was returned to the Coast Guard for a resumption of peacetime service. Tahoma was decommissioned on 5 June 1953; and stored at Curtis Bay, Maryland. She was sold to Bethlehem Steel Company for scrap on 17 October 1955.
