= Philip F. Roach =

United States Coast Guard commodore

Philip Francis Roach
- Born: 11 February 1881; Sedalia, Colorado, U.S.
- Died: 8 March 1976 (aged 95)
- Burial place: Arlington National Cemetery
- Military career
- Allegiance: United States of America
- Branch: U.S. Revenue Cutter Service (1904–1915); U.S. Coast Guard (1915–1945)
- Service years: 1904–1945
- Rank: Commodore
- Conflicts: World War I, World War II
- Awards: Navy Cross, Legion of Merit

Philip F. Roach was a commodore in the United States Coast Guard and a recipient of the Navy Cross for his service in World War I and the Legion of Merit for his service in World War II.

== Career ==
Roach was appointed a cadet at the Revenue Cutter Service School of Instruction on 26 May 1904 and commissioned as a third lieutenant (Note: The rank of third lieutenant is the equivalent to an ensign in current naval rank structure. A second lieutenant was equivalent to the current rank of lieutenant, junior grade. A first lieutenant was equivalent to the current rank of lieutenant. After 1921 the rank structure of Coast Guard officers was identical to the Navy.) in the service on 19 February 1907. His first assignment after school graduation was aboard USRC Gresham homeported at Boston, Massachusetts. In April he was transferred to Milwaukee, Wisconsin aboard USRC Tuscarora. In December, he was assigned to USRC Apache homeported at Baltimore, Maryland. While serving on Apache he was promoted to second lieutenant on 1 January 1908. In April 1909 he reported to Seattle, Washington for duty in Alaska waters aboard USRC Rush. Two years later, Roach was transferred to USRC McCulloch at Sausalito, California. In May 1912 he began serving aboard USRC Seminole at Wilmington, North Carolina. From June 1912 to April 1915 he served at Savannah, Georgia aboard USRC Yamacraw. (Note: On 28 January 1915 the Revenue Cutter Service merged with the United States Life-Saving Service to form the United States Coast Guard. Thereafter USRC Yamacraw was known as USCGC Yamacraw.) After a short assignment aboard USCGC Apache at Baltimore until 2 October 1916, he reported for duty at Coast Guard headquarters in Washington, D.C. In May 1917, he was assigned as executive officer of USCGC Tampa based at Key West, Florida.

=== World War I service ===
On 30 July 1917, Roach was assigned to command USCGC Manning and he was in command when Manning was sent to Europe during World War I. He was transferred to the command of USS Lydonia in July 1918 and on 21 August 1918, he was promoted to first lieutenant. For his service as commanding officer of Lydonia during the war, he was awarded the Navy Cross for distinguished service while escorting other ships carrying troops and supplies through mine and submarine infested waters between Gibraltar, Genoa and Bizerte.

=== Inter-war years ===
Roach was assigned to Coast Guard headquarters for ordnance, personnel and communications duty on 6 February 1919. In November 1921, Roach was assigned to USCGC Seneca at New York City. He was promoted to lieutenant commander on 12 January 1923. He was named executive officer of USCGC Cassin in August 1924 and later assumed command of the cutter. Roach was promoted to commander 1 July 1926. He was stationed in Camden, New Jersey as an inspector at the shipyard that was building the first 165-foot patrol cutters in November 1926. In February 1927 he was assigned administrative duties and command of Squadron One of the Offshore Patrol Force Headquartered at Boston. Roach assumed command USCGC Modoc based at Boston in March 1929. In December 1930 he reported to the division commander of the New York Division. From February to April 1934 he was commanding officer of USCGC Northland homeported at Oakland, California. In June 1936 he reported to the Philadelphia Navy Yard to supervise the construction of USCGC Duane. After commissioning of the cutter in August 1937, he was her first commanding officer. In October 1938 he returned to Coast Guard headquarters and served as chairman of the Permanent Board. While serving as chairman Roach was promoted to the rank of captain on 25 May 1939.

=== World War II service ===
Roach was transferred to San Francisco, California in April 1942 to assume duties as District Captain of the Port of the 12th Naval District. He was promoted to commodore on 1 June 1943. Roach retired from the Coast Guard in 1945. Upon his retirement he was awarded the Legion of Merit medal for exceptionally meritorious service during World War II.

== Personal life ==
Roach married Helen Bryan of Seattle, Washington in December 1939. He died 8 March 1976 and is buried at the Arlington National Cemetery.

== Notes ==
=== References used ===
- "Commodore Philip F. Roach, USCG" (PDF). U.S. Coast Guard Historian's Office.
- "Philip Francis Roach". Hall of Valor. Military Times.
- Register of the officers, vessels and stations of the United States Coast Guard, January 1, 1917. U.S. Government Printing Office. 1917.
- Register of the officers, vessels and stations of the United States Coast Guard, January 1, 1918. U.S. Government Printing Office. 1918.
- Cipra, Dave. "A History of Sea Service Ranks & Titles" (PDF). Commandant's Bulletin. 85 (5–8, 11–12). U.S. Coast Guard.
- Larzelere, Alex (2003). The Coast Guard in World War I: An Untold Story. Naval Institute Press, Annapolis, Maryland. ISBN 978-1-55750-476-0.
