= Algonquin-class cutter =

Algonquin-class cutter may refer to:

- Algonquin-class cutter (1934), a United States Coast Guard cutter class
- Algonquin-class cutter (1898), a United States Revenue Cutter Service ship class that included USRC Algonquin and USRC Onondaga
