= USRC Manning =

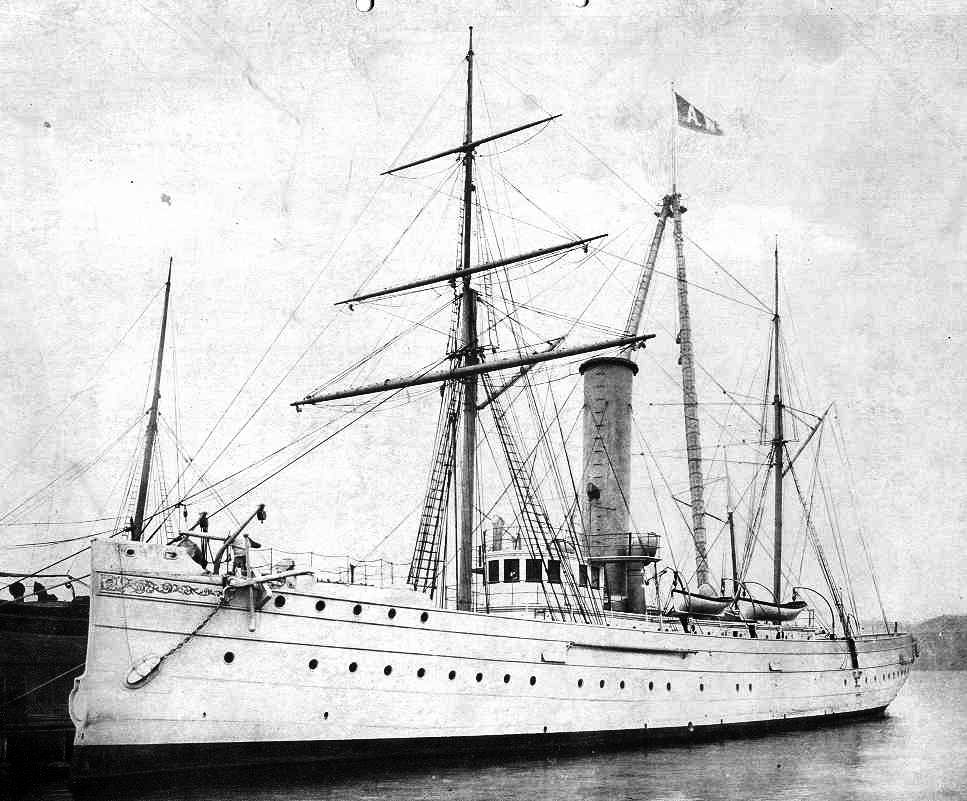

History

United States
- Name: USRC Manning
- Namesake: Daniel Manning, 37th United States Secretary of the Treasury
- Operator: U.S. Revenue Cutter Service (1898–1915); U.S. Coast Guard (1915–1930)
- Awarded: 27 June 1895
- Builder: Atlantic Works, East Boston, Massachusetts
- Cost: $159,951
- Completed: 11 August 1897
- Commissioned: 8 January 1898 to 2 February 1925
- Recommissioned: 7 January 1926
- Decommissioned: 22 May 1930
- Fate: Sold 6 December 1930

General characteristics
- Type: Revenue cutter
- Displacement: 1,150 tons
- Length: 205 ft 0 in (62.48 m)
- Beam: 32 ft 0 in (9.75 m)
- Draft: 13 ft 9 in (4.19 m)
- Installed power: Triple-expansion steam engine, 25 in (0.64 m), 37.5 in (0.95 m), 56.25 in (1.429 m) diameter X 30 in (0.76 m) stroke. 2,181 shp, single screw
- Sail plan: originally brigantine
- Speed: 17 knots
- Complement: (normal) 10 officers, 65 enlisted; (1917) 8 officers, 4 warrant officers, 96 enlisted
- Armament: (1898) 2 × 4-inch rapid fire rifles; 2 × 6-pounder rapid fire guns

USRC Manning was a revenue cutter of the United States Revenue Cutter Service that served from 1898 to 1930, and saw service in the U.S. Navy in the Spanish–American War and World War I.

== Construction ==
Designed as a cruising cutter for Bering Sea service, Manning was built by Atlantic Works, East Boston, Massachusetts, for the U.S. Revenue Cutter Service. She was accepted by Captain R.M Clark for the Revenue Cutter Service on 11 August 1897. She commissioned on 8 January 1898 and was assigned cruising grounds along the New England coast. Her lines were those of ancestral clipper cutters, but with a plumb bow instead of the more graceful clipper stem. She was powered by a 2,181 horsepower triple expansion steam engine and utilized a coal fired high pressure boiler which allowed a top speed of 17 knots. (Note: At some point Manning had been refit with oil fired boilers prior to her World War I service. This probably took place during a drydock overhaul at Mare Island Naval Shipyard during the timeframe of October 1912 and May 1913 as the "Record of Movements" mentions the replacement of the boiler.) The hull was of composite construction with frames placed at two foot intervals with 3/8 inch steel plate and sheathed from her bottom to two feet above the waterline with five inch thick Oregon fir planks. Below the waterline Manning was sheathed in copper and had eleven watertight bulkheads. The composite design was thought at the time better to weather the ice conditions of the Bering Sea. As tensions mounted before the Spanish–American War was declared, she carried a single bow torpedo tube. Manning and the cutters built during the same time, USRC Gresham, USRC McCulloch, USRC Algonquin, and USRC Onondaga were the last cruising cutters rigged for sail and carried the first electric generators installed on cutters. (Note: An exception was the USCGC Northland which was commissioned 7 May 1927 and was built specifically for Bering Sea Patrol service. The remote duty contemplated by the designers led them to believe that an alternate method of propulsion would be advisable in case there were mechanical failures. Her sail plan was removed in 1936 as unnecessary.) As a group, they were suitable for scouting, for rendering assistance, and for cruising at moderately long range. So successful was the design that these cutters furnished the general pattern for cutter construction for the ensuing 20 years.

== History ==
=== Spanish–American War ===
Manning served during the Spanish–American War with the U.S. Navy during the period 24 March 1898 to 17 August 1898, while based out of Norfolk, Virginia, as a coastal patrol vessel. This period included a four-month war deployment, from May 1898 through August 1898, on blockade and escort duty off Cuba. On 12 May 1898, she joined the armed yacht USS Wasp and the unarmored cruiser USS Dolphin first in landing, then in providing naval gunfire support for the evacuation of a force of U.S. Army soldiers at Cabañas, Cuba.

=== Bering Sea Patrol ===
After the cessation of hostilities with Spain, Manning returned to the operational control of the Revenue Cutter Service. Her patrol duties took her along both the East Coast from Boston to Key West and included a patrol to Cuba and Puerto Rico. On 2 January 1900 Manning was ordered report to San Francisco by way of the Straits of Magellan for duties with the Bering Sea Patrol. During the years of 1900 through 1916 she patrolled the Bering Sea enforcing sealing treaties to prevent pelagic sealing and performing search and rescue duties, missing only the years 1904, 1906 and 1908. On her first Bering Sea cruise in 1900, Manning conducted hydrographic surveys as well as sealing patrols. She also rescued the passengers of the stranded barkentine Leslie D, which was wrecked on Nunivak Island. On 6 September 1903, Manning delivered 38 passengers and eight crew members of the schooner Abbie M. Deering – which was wrecked on Baby Island in northwestern Akutan Pass on 4 September 1903 – safely to Unalaska. Later the same day, the crew was called upon by Captain Michael Healy of the USRC Thetis to assist in fighting a fire on the American ship St. Francis on the opposite side of the wharf from Thetis. In 1904 she performed patrol duties along the West Coast. During the 1905 Bering Sea cruise, the crew of Manning distributed boxes of clothing to natives of Attu and Atka that were provided by the Women's National Relief Association and during a second trip delivered more boxes of clothes donated by a Seattle, Washington hardware store to a warehouse at Dutch Harbor so that other cutters on the patrol could deliver them to other settlements. On 13 December 1905 Manning was assigned patrol duties in Hawaii where she remained until 8 May 1907 when she departed for the Bering Sea. Patrol work was cut short during the 1907 season when Manning struck an uncharted rock in Prince William Sound 15 August. Temporary repairs were made and she made for Bremerton Navy Yard for drydocking and permanent repairs in September. During 1908 Manning patrolled the Pacific Coast and assisted in several search and rescue cases.

Typical of a patrol season in the Bering Sea, in 1910 Manning had sailed nearly 15,000 mi (24,000 km) and boarded 14 Japanese sealers that had entered the three mile limit. After the 1911 North Pacific Sealing convention went into effect, the patrol area was extended to waters north of the thirtieth parallel and the seal population doubled by 1912.

In June 1912, Manning served as a temporary place of refuge for Alaskan islanders during the eruption of Novarupta. Manning had been docked in the Kodiak harbor when the eruption occurred and would be used to harbor refugees from Kodiak Island, Woody Island, and Saint Paul Island.

In October 1912, Manning received orders to report to Mare Island Naval Shipyard for drydock repairs which were completed in March 1913. During a trial run with new boilers on 20 May the engines seized up and she received a tow from USRC Golden Gate. After a successful trial on 24 May 1913 she sailed for Alaska.

When the Revenue Cutter Service and the United States Lifesaving Service combined in 1915 to form the new United States Coast Guard, Manning became part of the new service and was thereafter known as USCGC Manning.

=== World War I ===
Manning received orders to report to the Coast Guard Depot at Curtis Bay, Maryland 26 January 1917 and departed soon thereafter arriving at the depot 7 March. On 6 April 1917 Manning once again became part of the U.S. Navy for service in World War I and served as one of the components of Squadron 2, Division 6 of the Atlantic Fleet Patrol Forces. On 30 July 1917, Manning along with the cutters Algonquin, Ossipee, Seneca, Tampa, and Yamacraw were ordered to be outfitted for "distant service" in an unspecified region. The six cutters were outfitted with 3-inch guns and depth charge racks and were assigned duty as convoy escorts based at Gibraltar. Manning sailed for Europe on 29 August 1917 with an increased wartime complement of eight officers, four warrant officers, and 96 enlisted sailors. The six cutters of the squadron immediately assumed wartime duties escorting convoys between Gibraltar and the United Kingdom, and conducting antisubmarine patrols in the Mediterranean Sea. These duties continued until 28 August 1919 when the cutters were turned back to the Coast Guard by executive order.

=== Post-War service ===
After World War I, the Coast Guard returned to the control of the Department of the Treasury, and in the spring of 1919 the International Ice Patrol, which had been suspended during World War I, was resumed. The annual report of the Secretary of the Treasury for 1921 noted that in the winter of 1920–21 winter patrols had been reestablished with eight vessels, one of which was Manning. On 18 September 1926 a hurricane hit south Florida and Manning was one of nine cutters sent by Commandant Frederick C. Billard to assist with maintaining order, improvising hospitals, searching for those still missing, and assisting local authorities.

Much of Manning's duty during her final years was out of Norfolk, where she decommissioned on 22 May 1930. On 6 December 1930 she was sold for $2200.02 to Charles L. Jording of Baltimore, Maryland.

== Notes ==
Footnotes

Citations

References used

- "U.S. Coast Guard General Order No.1" (PDF). Historic Documents & Publications. U.S. Coast Guard Historian's Office. Archived from the original (PDF) on 19 May 2017.
- "Manning". Dictionary of American Naval Fighting Ships. U.S. Navy Naval History and Heritage Command. Archived from the original on 5 November 2012.
- "Manning, 1898" (PDF). Cutters, Craft & U.S. Coast Guard-Manned Army & Navy Vessels. U.S. Coast Guard Historian's Office. Archived from the original (PDF) on 21 May 2017.
- "Record of Movements, Vessels of the United States Coast Guard, 1790–December 31, 1933" (PDF). Historic Documents. U.S. Coast Guard Historian's Office.
- Canney, Donald L. (1995). U.S. Coast Guard and Revenue Cutters, 1790–1935. Naval Institute Press, Annapolis, Maryland. ISBN 978-1-55750-101-1.
- Evans, Stephen H. (1949). The United States Coast Guard 1790–1915: A Definitive History. Naval Institute Press, Annapolis, Maryland.
- Good, Warren; Burwell, Michael. "Abbie M. Deering". Alaska Shipwrecks. Lulu.com.
- Johnson, Robert Irwin (1987). Guardians of the Sea, History of the United States Coast Guard, 1915 to the Present. Naval Institute Press, Annapolis, Maryland. ISBN 978-0-87021-720-3.
- King, Irving H. (1996). The Coast Guard Expands, 1865–1915: New Roles, New Frontiers. Naval Institute Press, Annapolis, Maryland. ISBN 978-1-55750-458-6.
- Larzelere, Alex (2003). The Coast Guard in World War I: An Untold Story. Naval Institute Press, Annapolis, Maryland. ISBN 978-1-55750-476-0.
- Strobridge, Truman R. and Dennis L. Noble (1999). Alaska and the U.S. Revenue Cutter Service 1867–1915. Naval Institute Press, Annapolis, Maryland. ISBN 978-1-55750-845-4.
