= MV J. A. Moffett Jr. =

American oil tanker

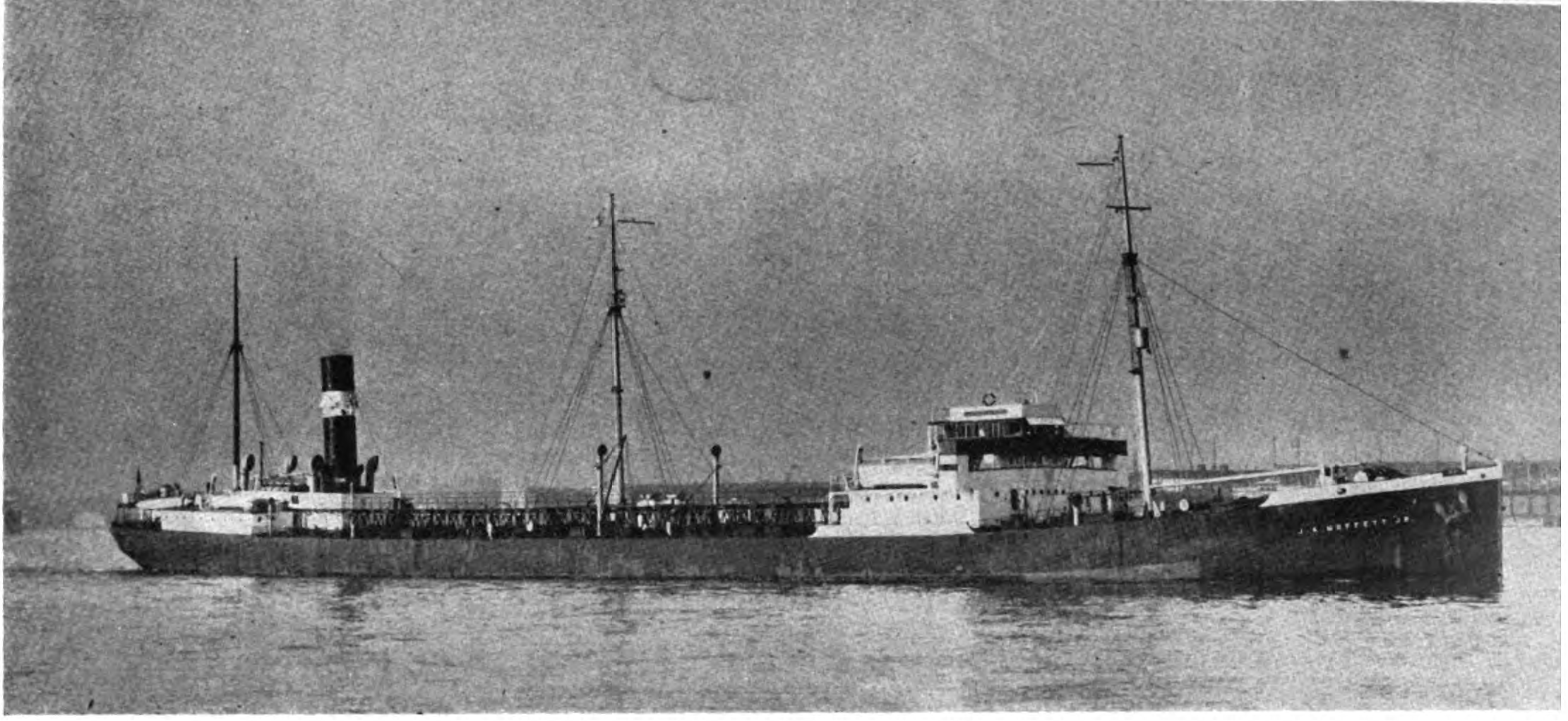

History

United States
- Name: J. A. Moffett Jr.
- Namesake: James A. Moffett, Jr.
- Owner: Standard Oil Company of New Jersey
- Port of registry: New York (1921–1927); Wilmington (1927–1942)
- Builder: Federal Shipbuilding Co., Kearney
- Yard number: 50
- Laid down: 23 July 1920
- Launched: 14 July 1921
- Sponsored by: Mrs. J. A. Moffett, Jr.
- Acquired: 5 August 1921
- Maiden voyage: 6 August 1921
- Identification: US Official Number 221521; Code letters MDBS (1921-1933); Call sign KDTU (1934-1942)
- In service: 1921–1942
- Fate: Torpedoed, abandoned, lifted, scrapped

General characteristics
- Type: Tanker
- Tonnage: 9,563 GRT (1921–1927); 5,978 NRT (1921–1927); 9,482 GRT (1927–1934); 5,928 NRT (1927–1934); 9,788 GRT (1934–1942); 6,137 NRT (1934–1942); 15,100 DWT
- Length: 499.2 ft (152.2 m)
- Beam: 68.1 ft (20.8 m)
- Draft: 28 ft 9 1/4 in (8.769 m)
- Depth: 30.5 ft (9.3 m)
- Installed power: 3,700 ihp
- Propulsion: 2 x Federal Shipbuilding Co. 3-cylinder triple expansion (1921–1927); 2 x Hooven, Owens & Rentschler 4-cylinder single acting two-stroke diesel engines (1927–1942); Twin screws
- Speed: 1921: 11 knots (20 km/h; 13 mph) 1927: 10.7 knots (19.8 km/h; 12.3 mph)
- Boats & landing craft carried: 4 lifeboats, 4 liferafts
- Complement: 1942: 8 officers, 30 crewmembers, 5 Navy gunners
- Armament: 1942: 1 4-inch gun, 2 machine guns

MV J. A. Moffett Jr. was an oil tanker built in 1920–1921 by the Federal Shipbuilding Company of Kearney for the Standard Oil Company of New Jersey with the purpose of carrying oil and petroleum products. Originally built as a steamship, the vessel had her engines changed in 1927 converting her into a motor vessel. She was torpedoed in 1942, killing the captain, before being abandoned, towed and sold for scrap.

== Design and construction ==
Following the passage of the Merchant Marine Act of 1920, the Standard Oil Company of New Jersey placed orders for over a dozen new tankers with several shipyards in the United States. As the new law provided companies with tax benefits in exchange for investment in American shipbuilding, Standard Oil decided to use this opportunity to significantly increase and modernize their fleet. As part of such effort, three tankers of approximately 15,000 deadweight tonnage each were ordered from the Federal Shipbuilding Company and named after Standard Oil directors. J. A. Moffett Jr. was the last of these three vessels (the other being SS Walter Jennings and SS E. T. Bedford), and was laid at the shipbuilder's yard on 23 July 1920 (yard number 50) and launched on 14 July 1921, with Mrs. James A. Moffett Jr., wife of one of the directors of the Standard Oil Company of New Jersey, being the sponsor. The launching was attended by approximately three hundred people, most of them being employees of Standard Oil.

The ship was shelter-deck type, had two main decks and was built on the principle of longitudinal framing providing extra strength to the body of the vessel. The tanker had a cargo pump room located amidships equipped with two main pumps of the horizontal duplex type capable to process approximately 4,500 barrels of oil per hour from ten double main cargo tanks constructed throughout the entire length of the vessel with a total capacity to carry approximately 5,015,388 US gallons (18,985,310 litres; 4,176,184 imperial gallons) of oil. The ship had her hull subdivided into compartments by 19 transverse oil- and water-tight bulkheads, and one centerline oil-tight bulkhead that ran the length of the ship. In addition, the ship had four cofferdams spread throughout the vessel for dry goods storage or to separate her fuel from both cargo and boiler rooms. The tanker had her machinery situated aft, with crew quarters being just above the engine room space. She was also equipped with wireless apparatus and submarine signal system, and had electrical lights installed along the decks.

As built, the ship was 499.2 feet (152.2 m) long (between perpendiculars) and 68.1 feet (20.8 m) abeam, and had a depth of 30.5 feet (9.3 m). J. A. Moffett Jr was originally assessed at 9,563 GRT and 5,978 NRT and had deadweight tonnage of approximately 15,100. The vessel had a steel hull and two triple expansion steam engines of total power of 3,700 ihp, with cylinders of 20 1/2-inch (52 cm), 35-inch (89 cm) and 60-inch (150 cm) diameter with a 42-inch (110 cm) stroke that moved the ship at up to 11.5 knots (13.2 mph; 21.3 km/h). The steam for the engine was supplied by three single-ended Scotch marine boilers fitted for oil fuel.

The sea trials were held on 3 August 1921 just outside the Staten Island in thick and rainy weather. After their successful completion, the tanker returned to her berth and was accepted by her owners on August 5.

== Service history ==
Following the delivery, J. A. Moffett Jr. sailed out from New York next day to load cargo at Baton Rouge. Upon arrival, she loaded full cargo of oil and left from New Orleans on August 15, bound for Copenhagen. She safely reached her destination after an uneventful voyage on September 5. Upon discharging her cargo, the vessel sailed back to the United States, and arrived at New Orleans on September 26, thus successfully completing her maiden voyage. The tanker made three more trips to Europe in 1921 delivering oil to Rotterdam and Hamburg. Following return from her last trip in February 1922, she was sub-chartered to the Humble Oil Company and spend the next twelve months carrying crude oil from Texas City to New York. For example, in November 1922 she delivered 115,000 barrels of oil from Texas City to New York and New Jersey area refineries. She made similar deliveries in January and February 1923, each time carrying approximately the same load. In early March 1923, Standard Oil of New Jersey decided to re-route many of their tankers to lift oil in California due to its overabundance there and cheaper prices. The tanker arrived at San Pedro on her first visit to the West Coast on March 21, where she loaded 15,000 tons of oil and sailed for New York on April 1. After passing through the Panama Canal on April 12, the vessel arrived at her destination on 21 April 1923, successfully completing her first coast-to-coast journey.

On 29 December 1927 J.A. Moffett Jr. would complete a harbor test after a refit of the engines, replacing the triple-expansion steam engines with two M.A.N. diesel-drive engines by Hooven, Owens & Rentschler Company of Hamilton at Stapleton. At a total cost of $500,000, J.A. Moffett Jr. and another sister ship lead the way for a re-engineing for the Standard Oil Fleet. Due to fog, a specific path for testing was not followed. The refit was completed at the Tietjen & Lang Plant at Hoboken, New Jersey of the Todd Shipbuilding Company. These new two-cylinder engines could develop a minimum of 1,500 horsepower at 90 revolutions a minute.

Following an engine refit in 1927, the new design was specifically built with ventilation of the engine room and preservation of motor lubrication oils in mind. The tanker had a special approach to cleaning lubrication fluid, whereas a tank holding 15 hours' worth of fluids would pump the liquid to a heater below. The oil then would heat up and pool in a lower reservoir, separating it from any containments. The cleaned oil would be pumped to a separate tank for use while the other would be cleaned.

Shortly before 10:40 PM the same day, J.A. Moffett Jr. collided with the US Coast Guard patrol boat USCGC Rush in Ambrose Channel in the fog, sinking the cutter. J.A. Moffett Jr. was outbound to Portland while the Rush was patrolling for smugglers. No injuries or deaths occurred, with the crew of Rush being transferred to the tanker. USCGC Seminole, Gresham, Pulaski, CG-225 and CG-246, sortied to assist out of the Stapleton Coast Guard Base. After the sinking, the Rush's crew was sent to the Pulaski.

Following the incident, J. A. Moffett Jr. was placed in drydock and examined until 6 January 1928. Repairs came to US$150.

Between 1939 and 1942, J.A. Moffett Jr. would complete 43 voyages, carrying 4,671,829 barrels of oil between ports mainly along the Gulf of Mexico and the Northeast United States. Her cargoes would primarily be made up of crude oil, with the occasional fuel oil manifest northbound and ballast southbound. It was also not uncommon to see her take on cargo in the western United States or in international ports.

== Attack by U-571 ==
MV J. A. Moffett Jr. (Florida)

On 12 June 1942 J. A. Moffett Jr. sailed out of Baltimore, destined to Port Arthur before joining a convoy at Lynnhaven Roads on the 26th. Two days later, at 2:30 AM damage to two engine pistons was reported to the bridge with the recommendation of leaving the convoy for port repairs. The convoy commander was notified at 7:30 AM. The request was approved without any escorting ships. The tanker then turned northwest for Wilmington, North Carolina sixty miles away. She arrived at around 3:30 PM on the 28th before pulling out on 4 July to continue the mission. She was escorted by two Canadian corvettes until Charleston, where she could either join a convoy or continue on her own. The tanker arrived at 11:00 AM on the 5th and decided to go on independently.

At midnight on 7 July she was 3 miles (4.8 km) southwest of the Tennessee Reef in the Florida Straights when a torpedo from German submarine U-571 hit the port side of the empty number two tank at 12:15. The captain ordered the ship to turn hard starboard in an attempt to beach the ship on the reef, but the engines were manually stopped after the first torpedo hit in accordance with outstanding orders. A second torpedo hit near the number 8 tank on the port side at around 12:35 AM, causing a major list to form. The list and the still turning ship forced the captain to order an abandonment of the ship shortly afterward. At around 12:50 AM, the submarine surfaced 1,500 ft (460 m) from the tanker and shelled the ship for 5 minutes. Eight rounds hit the port side, igniting the midship superstructure. The flumes of water from the first torpedo hit caused water to collect in the lifeboats, making them heavier than normal. When the captain was assisting to launch the number 2 lifeboat, the forward davit loosened, which caused the bow of the lifeboat to violently drop forward. The captain's arm was amputated by the line before throwing his body overboard still attached to the line. He later bled to death, becoming the only fatality. At 2:30 AM an aircraft flew overhead, followed by USCGC Nike and the US Coast Guard Reserve crewed civilian vessels Mary Jane and Southbound which arrived to rescue survivors. The tanker carried four lifeboats and four life rafts, with one of each type being lost. One lifeboat failed to launch due to an accident, and a liferaft floated away. The Mary Jane and Southbound were carrying the owner's families when the J.A. Moffett Jr. was hit. Being the only vessels in range, they both took on guardsmen at local stations before taking on sailors from the lifeboats. Another two men would be picked up from the water. The weather, low light, and overweighed boats posed a difficult challenge to navigation. Both arrived safely in port. Everyone was rescued and brought to Miami, eventually rendezvousing in New York.

== Salvage ==
By 9 July 1942 the ship had not yet sunk, so a five-man team composed of a company representative, the chief engineer, boatswain, chief mate, and a salvage officer boarded the J.A. Moffett Jr. to survey the damage. They found the conditions to be unfavorable, with six of ten tanks torpedoed and various shell damage aft. On 11 July the decision was made to float the ship to the Todd Galveston Dry Docks in Galveston for scrapping. After being floated by the Merritt-Chapman & Scott Company tug Willett, she was stripped of the donkey boilers, steam condenser, various auxiliary units, pumps, fitting, and valves followed by the hulk being sold for scrap in 1943.

== Legacy ==
The only fatality of U-571's attack, Captain Patrick S. Mahony, was honored by the United States Maritime Commission by the naming of liberty ship SS Patrick S. Mahony. He was the fourth of six men in the company to have that honor.
