= Norman B. Hall =

American Coast Guard engineer

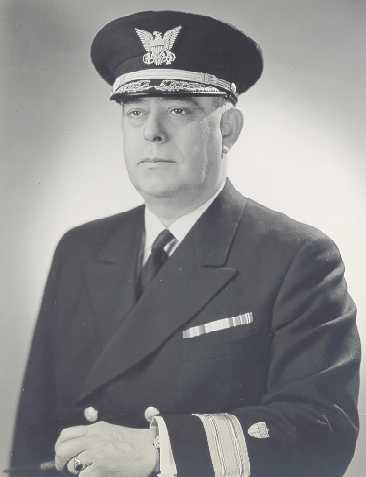
- Born: 1 September 1886; New York City
- Died: 26 April 1962 (aged 75); Bethesda, Maryland
- Military career
- Allegiance: United States
- Branch: United States Coast Guard
- Service years: 1907–1947
- Rank: Rear Admiral
- Awards: Legion of Merit

Norman Brierley Hall (1 September 1886 – 26 April 1962) was an engineering officer in the United States Coast Guard who became the first aviation engineer in the Coast Guard in 1916.

Hall was born at New York City on 1 September 1886 and graduated from high school in Brooklyn, New York in 1903. He then attended the Webb Academy of Marine Engineering and Naval Architecture, graduating in June 1906. Hall worked at a Hoboken, New Jersey shipyard as a general draftsman for fifteen months before becoming a cadet engineer in the U.S. Revenue Cutter Service on 21 October 1907. He was commissioned a third lieutenant of engineers on 4 September 1908.

Hall was promoted to second lieutenant of engineers on 5 January 1911. He was assigned to USRC Onondaga on 11 August 1914. While serving there, he discussed the possibility of using aircraft to aid search and rescue missions with his commander Captain Benjamin M. Chiswell and Third Lieutenant Elmer F. Stone. With Chiswell's encouragement, Commandant Ellsworth P. Bertholf sent Hall to study aircraft design, construction and maintenance at the Curtiss Aeroplane and Motor Company factory in Hammondsport, New York on 31 October 1916.

Hall was promoted to first lieutenant of engineers on 26 April 1921 and then to lieutenant commander on 12 January 1923. From April 1928 to May 1933, he was head of aviation engineering activities at Coast Guard headquarters. On 1 July 1929, he was promoted to commander.

On 23 September 1938, Hall was promoted to captain. In June 1942, he was made chief of the Port Security Division. In August 1942, Hall was given the additional assignment of Coast Guard liaison to the Facility Security Division of the Office of the Petroleum Coordinator for War. In July 1943, he was also made a member of the Merchant Marine Council. On 25 November 1944, Hall was promoted to commodore. Early in 1945, he replaced James A. Hirshfield as vice chairman of the Merchant Marine Council. Hall was awarded the Legion of Merit for his World War II service.

At the time of his retirement on 1 November 1947, Hall was promoted to rear admiral.

Hall died on 26 April 1962 in Bethesda, Maryland. He was interred at Green-Wood Cemetery in Brooklyn, New York next to his first wife Elizabeth (Hamilton) Hall (6 October 1892 – 8 October 1951). He had remarried with a widow, Gladys Marsh Footner, in 1954 and they were living in Chevy Chase, Maryland at the time of his death.
