= Benjamin M. Chiswell =

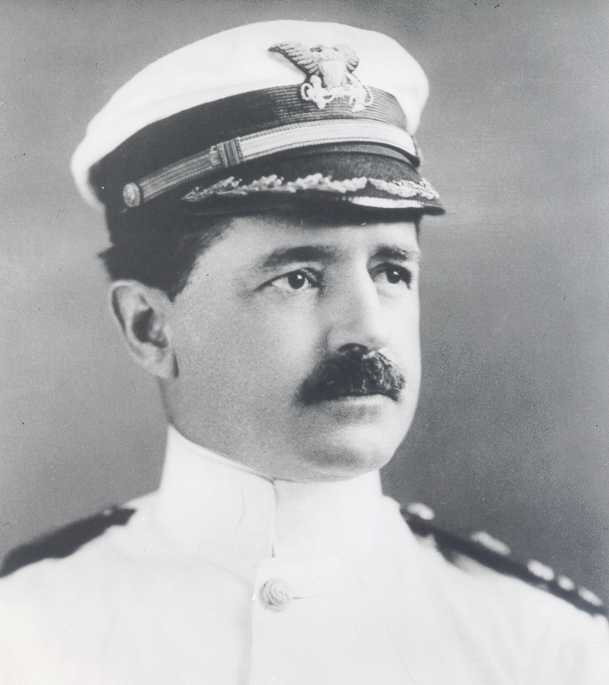
- Born: March 7, 1875; Dickerson, Maryland, U.S.
- Died: July 26, 1942 (aged 67); Frederick, Maryland, U.S.
- Burial place: Arlington National Cemetery
- Military career
- Allegiance: United States
- Branch: United States Coast Guard
- Service years: 1896–1934
- Rank: Rear Admiral
- Commands: Vice Commandant of the United States Coast Guard
- Conflicts: Spanish–American War; World War I
- Awards: Navy Cross

Benjamin Maurice Chiswell (March 7, 1875 – July 26, 1942) was a rear admiral in the United States Coast Guard who served as the first vice commandant from 1929 to 1931.

Chiswell was born at Dickerson, Maryland on March 7, 1875 and entered the Revenue Cutter Service School of Instruction as a cadet on April 10, 1894. He was commissioned as a third lieutenant in the U.S. Revenue Cutter Service on April 27, 1896. On August 11, 1897 Chiswell was promoted to second lieutenant. During the Spanish–American War, he served as navigator aboard USRC Grant. Chiswell was promoted to first lieutenant on June 20, 1904 and captain on July 6, 1911. On September 20, 1913 he assumed command of USRC Onondaga which was homeported at Norfolk, Virginia. While commander, Chiswell discussed the possibility of using aircraft to aid search and rescue missions with junior officers Elmer F. Stone and Norman B. Hall. He later helped Stone attend naval flight training at Pensacola, Florida.

During World War I, Chiswell commanded USS Algonquin based at Gibraltar, for which he was subsequently awarded the Navy Cross. Before the end of the war, he also commanded USS Gresham along the U.S. Atlantic Coast.

In 1921 when U.S. Coast Guard officer ranks were aligned with U.S. Navy ranks, Chiswell was redesignated a lieutenant commander. He was subsequently promoted to commander on January 12, 1923 and then to captain on July 1, 1926.

After serving as Assistant Commandant from 1929 to 1931, Chiswell was given command of the Norfolk Division of the Coast Guard. In October 1932, he assumed command of the New York Division. In early 1933, Chiswell became head of the newly created Eastern Area comprising the Boston, New York and Norfolk Divisions.

At the time of his retirement in October 1934, Chiswell was promoted to rear admiral based on his wartime service record.
