= Walter Hinton =

Walter T. Hinton
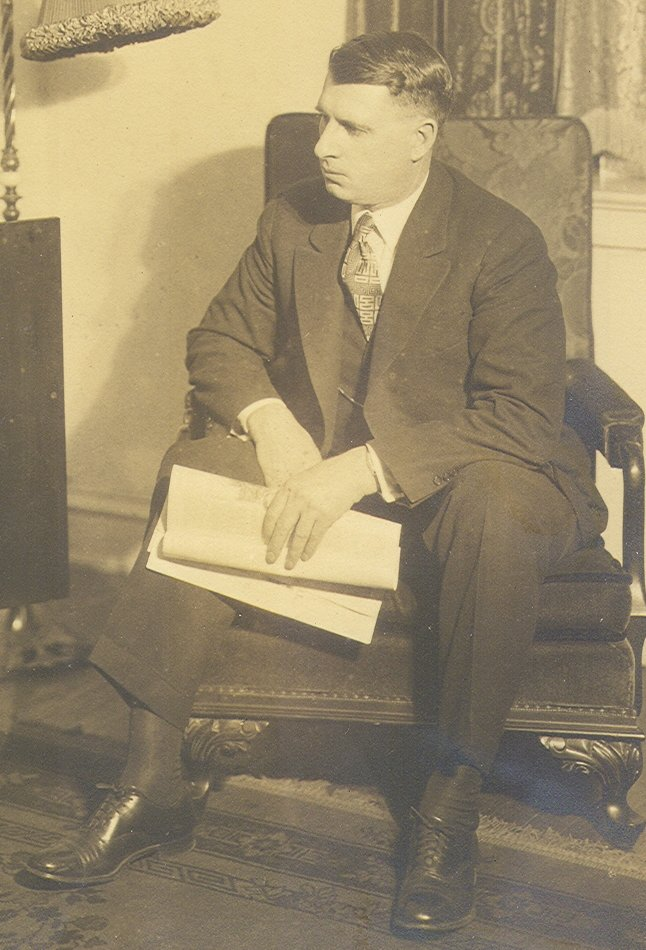
- Hinton, about 1926
- Born: 10 November 1888; Pleasant Township, Van Wert County, Ohio
- Died: 28 October 1981 (aged 92); Pompano Beach, Florida
- Known for: Co-pilot of the first airplane to complete a transatlantic flight.

Walter T. Hinton (10 November 1888 – 28 October 1981) was a United States aviator.

Hinton was born in Pleasant Township of Van Wert County, Ohio. He was raised on a farm in Tully Township of the same county near the town of Convoy. Seeing a poster urging young men to "Join the Navy and See the World", he joined the United States Navy. He saw action in the 1914 United States occupation of Veracruz, Mexico. Hinton had a great fascination with early aircraft, and soon went into naval aviation.

Hinton achieved fame as one of the two pilots, along with Elmer F. Stone, of the Curtiss NC flying boat "NC-4", the first aircraft to make a transatlantic flight, in May 1919. After the successful completion of this journey, he was made a knight of the Order of the Tower and Sword by the Portuguese government on 3 June 1919. As a member of the NC-4 crew, he was awarded the Navy Cross and later received a Congressional Gold Medal in 1929.

Hinton's aeronautic adventures during the 1920s include exploring the Arctic by balloon, and a wayward flight on Navy balloon A-5598 from Rockaway Naval Air Station to Moose Factory, Ontario in the winter, which caused a month-long hike to civilization. Hinton and Kloor wrote letters home which their families sold to newspapers describing the flight, which prompted the Navy to start enforcing rarely used censorship rules. Hinton made the first flight from North America to South America (on the second try—he floated on a wing in shark infested waters off Cuba for a while at the end of the first try), and explored the Amazon rainforest by hydroplane.

He spent years touring as a speaker promoting aviation.

Walter Hinton married first to Sallie Adeline Fenner in New Orleans, Louisiana on November 17, 1917. They were divorced by 1930. Walter then married another divorcee, Carrie Susan (Muller) Knapp, in a church near Times Square in New York City on New Year's Eve, 1931. He was 43 years old and she was 36. There were no children born of either marriage.

An airport in the county of his birth was rededicated as the Van Wert County Airport: Honorary Walter Hinton Field on July 7, 1985. The 100-year anniversary of his transatlantic flight was celebrated on Walter Hinton Day at the Van Wert County Regional Airport (KVNW) on May 18, 2019.

Hinton spent his retirement in Pompano Beach, Florida, where he delighted in sharing his memories with local children. One of his happiest events of his later years was being a special guest on an early supersonic transatlantic flight of the Concorde, making the trip which had first taken Hinton 19 days in less than four hours.

Hinton was president and founder of the Aviation Institute of U.S.A Washington D.C. in 1927 and 1928, where he published several periodicals on aviation. Periodicals included Opportunities in Aviation, The Wright Whirlwind Motor, Pioneers in Aviation, Aviation Progress, and Wings of Opportunity.

After his death in 1981, his ashes were interred at Arlington National Cemetery.
