= Elmer Fowler Stone =

U.S. Coast Guard officer (1887–1936)

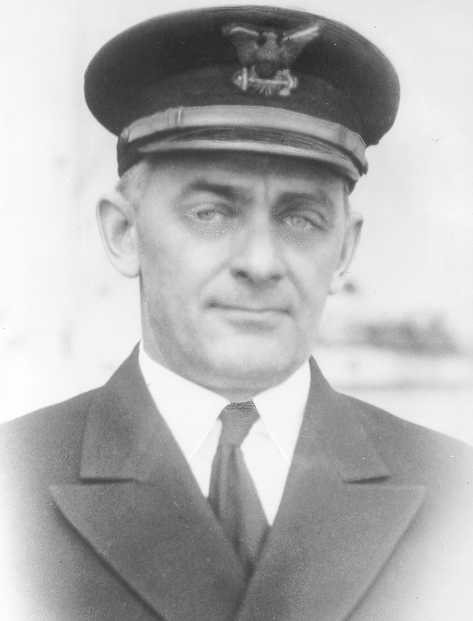
- Commander Elmer Fowler Stone
- Born: January 22, 1887; Livonia, New York, U.S.
- Died: May 20, 1936 (aged 49); San Diego, California, U.S.
- Burial place: Arlington National Cemetery
- Military career
- Allegiance: United States of America
- Branch: United States Coast Guard
- Service years: 1910-1936
- Rank: Commander
- Awards: Navy Cross; NC-4 Medal; Order of the Tower and Sword (PT); Air Force Cross (UK)

Elmer "Archie" Fowler Stone (January 22, 1887 – May 20, 1936) was a United States naval aviator and a commander in the United States Coast Guard.

== Biography ==
Stone was born in Livonia, New York and grew up in Norfolk, Virginia. He joined the U.S. Revenue Cutter Service as a cadet at the Revenue Cutter Service School of Instruction on April 28, 1910.

Elmer Stone was a United States Coast Guard aviation pioneer; in early 1915 Stone and another officer Norman B. Hall, were the first to suggest that the Coast Guard develop an aviation capability. With the encouragement of their commanding officer, Captain Benjamin M. Chiswell of the USRC Onondaga, Lieutenants Stone and Hall approached the Curtiss Flying School in Newport News, Virginia about using aircraft in air-sea rescue operations, and participated in experimental flights in a Curtiss Model F flying boat. During the summer of 1915, Stone and Hall performed scouting patrols for Onondaga, assisting in search missions that the cutter was assigned. On March 28, 1916, he was assigned as a student aviator at the United States Navy flight facility in Pensacola, Florida. The same year he also studied aeronautical engineering at the Curtiss factory. On April 10, 1917, Stone became the Coast Guard's first aviator upon graduating from flight training at Pensacola and was appointed as Coast Guard Aviator No. 1 and Naval Aviator No. 38. On October 12, 1917, Stone was assigned to the U.S. Navy Aeronautic Station at Rockaway, New York.

In May 1919 First Lieutenant Elmer F. Stone was one of the two pilots, along with Walter Hinton, on the first successful transatlantic flight on NC-4 with Lieutenant Commander Albert C. Read, USN, as the mission commander and navigator. After the historic flight, he was made a knight of the Order of the Tower and Sword by the Portuguese government (June 3, 1919), awarded the British Air Force Cross by the British government (June 9, 1919) and received a promotion to the temporary rank of captain on September 25, 1919. He was awarded the Navy Cross and Congressional Medal of Achievement for "distinguished service in making the first successful trans-Atlantic flight" on November 11, 1920.

For the next six years he worked with the Navy's Bureau of Aeronautics where he assisted in the development of the catapults and arresting gear of the new aircraft carriers USS Lexington and USS Saratoga, equipment still used on aircraft carriers to this day. He continued to promote aviation in the U.S. Coast Guard during the 1920s. He collaborated with the Curtiss Aeroplane and Motor Company on development of airborne "motor lifeboats" for the explicit purpose of lifesaving missions, and in this is one of the pioneers of modern air-sea rescue. He also commanded a former destroyer that was turned over to the U.S. Coast Guard and used in the enforcement of Prohibition.

After a tour at sea, Stone became the commanding officer of the Coast Guard Aviation Unit at Cape May, New Jersey, where he continued to develop his skill at making open-ocean landings. On April 5, 1933, Stone put his open-ocean landing skills to the test when the Navy dirigible Akron went down off the Atlantic coast in a storm with only three survivors of the 76 aboard, Stone was the only pilot available willing to attempt a landing in the heavy seas. He accomplished this successfully, but was too late to save any more lives. On December 20, 1934, he broke the world seaplane speed record, 191 miles per hour over a 3 kilometer test course.

Commander Stone's last duty was as the commanding officer of the Air Patrol Detachment in San Diego.

He died of a heart attack while on duty on May 20, 1936, in San Diego, California, while inspecting a new aircraft and was buried in Arlington National Cemetery.

== Legacy ==
Commander Elmer "Archie" Stone was inducted into the United States Naval Aviation Hall of Honor on May 5, 1983, and is also a member of the U.S. Coast Guard Aviation Hall of Fame. Stone was a pivotal figure in the establishment and development of aviation for the Coast Guard and the Navy and was a favorite of many of the famous aviation figures of the day, including Eddie Rickenbacker, aircraft designers Anthony Fokker, Igor Sikorsky, and Alexander P. de Seversky.

The ninth Legend-class National Security cutter USCGC Stone is named in honor of Commander Stone.

== Notes ==
Citations

- "Commander Elmer Fowler Stone". United States Coast Guard web site.
- "Official orders, correspondence and documents related to E. F. Stone's aviation career" (PDF). United States Coast Guard web site.

References used

- Register of the officers, vessels and stations of the United States Coast Guard, July 1, 1916. U.S. Government Printing Office. 1916.
- Register of the officers, vessels and stations of the United States Coast Guard, January 1, 1918. U.S. Government Printing Office. 1918.
- Beard, Barrett Thomas (1996). Wonderful Flying Machines: A History of U.S. Coast Guard Helicopters. Annapolis, Maryland: Naval Institute Press. ISBN 978-1-55750-086-1.
- Evans, Stephen H. (1949). The United States Coast Guard 1790–1915: A Definitive History. Naval Institute Press, Annapolis, Maryland.
- Noble, Dennis L. (1990). Historical Register U.S. Revenue Cutter Service Officers, 1790–1914. Coast Guard Historian's Office, U.S. Coast Guard Headquarters, Washington, DC.
- Thiesen, Ph.D., William H. (April 2010). "Elmer F. Stone '13 and the Pioneering Role of Coast Guard Academy Graduates in Early Naval and Coast Guard Aviation" (pdf). USCG.mil. The Foundation for Coast Guard History.
