= D-class blimp =

D class
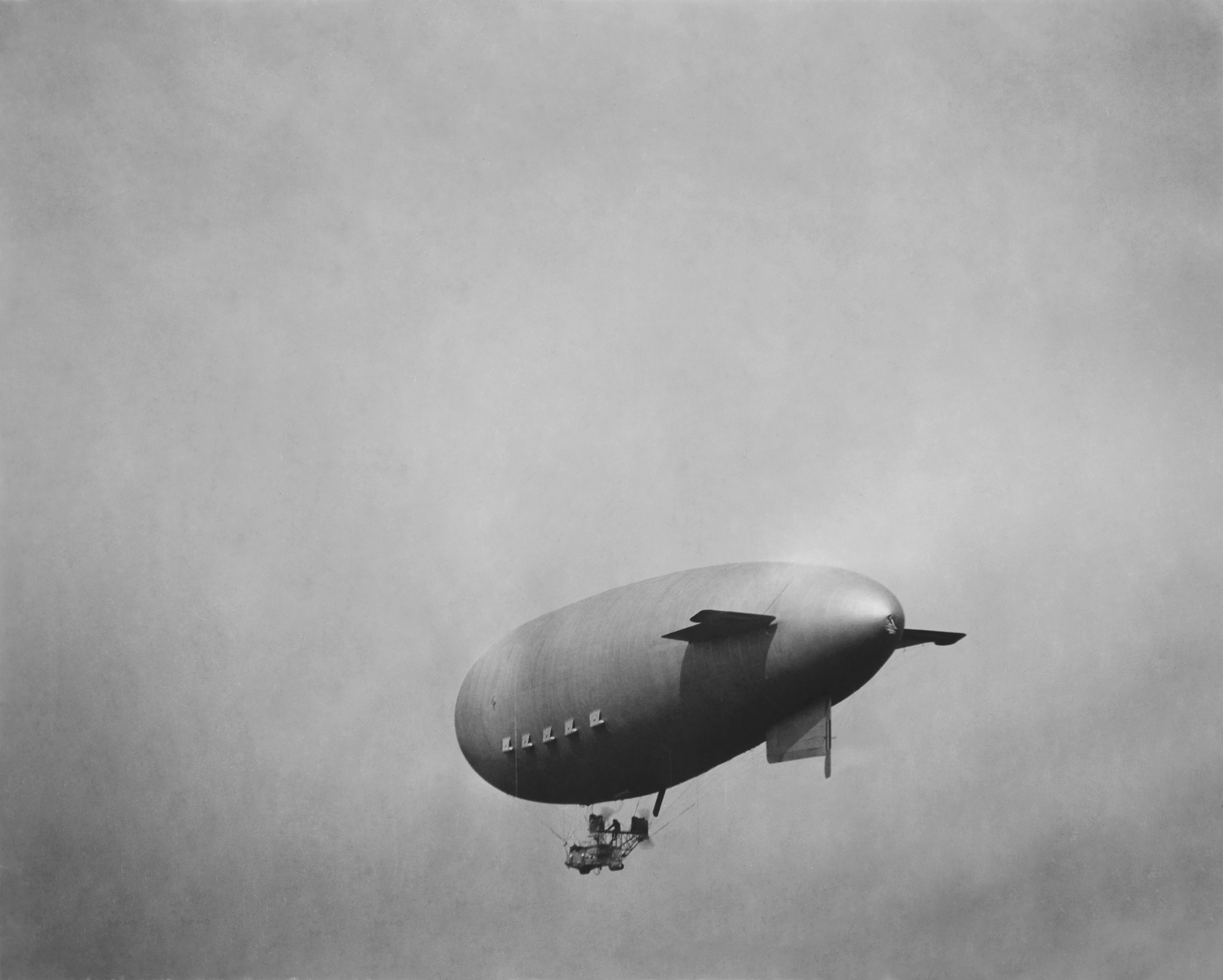
- NAVY D-2

General information
- Type: Patrol airship
- Manufacturer: Various (Goodyear-Zeppelin Corporation, Goodrich)
- Primary user: United States Navy
- Number built: 6

History
- First flight: 13 July 1920 at Wingfoot Lake, Ohio
- Retired: 1924

The D class blimp was a patrol airship used by the US Navy in the early 1920s. The D-type blimps were slightly larger than the C-type and had many detail improvements.

The Navy continued the practice of dividing the envelope production between Goodyear and Goodrich. The control cars were manufactured by the Naval Aircraft Factory. The major improvements over the C-type blimps were a better control car design and easier, more reliable controls and instrumentation. The engines were moved to the rear to reduce noise and allow easier communications between crew members. The fuel tanks were suspended from the sides of the envelope. The envelope was identical to the C-type, except an additional six-foot panel was inserted for a total length of 198 feet (60 m) and a volume of 190,000 cubic feet (5,400 m^{3}). The last of the D-Class, D-6, had a redesigned control car by Leroy Grumman who later founded the Grumman Aircraft Engineering Corporation.

== Operational history ==
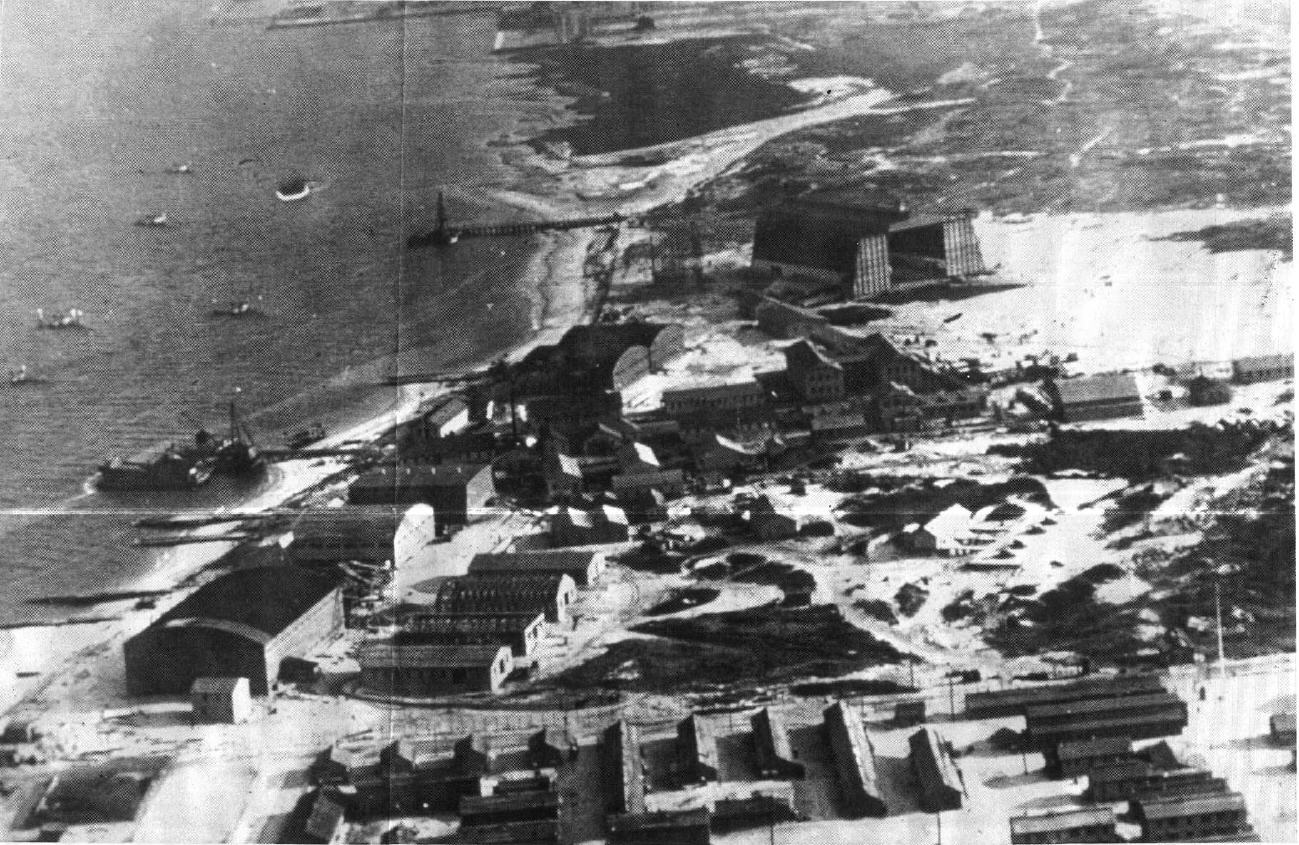
Aerial view of NAS Rockaway in 1919 looking eastward with view of airship hangar.

On the day of its maiden fight, the D-1 caught fire and burned inside Goodyear's Wingfoot Lake Hangar. The D-2, D-3, D-4 and D-5 were transferred to the United States Army which the Air Ship Board had given the primary role of operating non-rigid airships after World War I. D-3 participated as an observation and photography aircraft at the famed "Mitchell" bombing test of 1921. D-3 also participated in the Mitchell bombing trials and tested experimental mooring masts. D-3 also participated in early "hook-on" experiments to see if it was possible for an airplane to fly up to and hook onto a trapeze hanging from an airship. No actual hook-ons were achieved, but approaches were practiced. D-4 also participated in the Mitchell trials, for observation and photography. The D-5 was never operated by the Army with that designation. After the loss of D-2, the D-5 was erected with more powerful 180 hp Wright V engines and flown as the D-2 (no. 2) D-2 (no 2 is a designation created by historian James Shock, never used by the Army). There is no evidence the airship flew for the Army with the designation "D-5". D-5 is believed to have been renumbered "D-2" after the loss of that airship.

The Navy retained one additional D-type, the D-6. The D-6 was built by the Naval Aircraft Factory, Philadelphia, Pennsylvania, but her design was sufficiently different that she was distinct from the other five D-class airships. It featured a further improved control car (the "D-1 Enclosed Cabin Car" which had a water tight bottom for landings on water and internal fuel tanks. The D-6 was burned in the Naval Air Station Rockaway hangar fire of 31 August 1921 along with two small dirigibles, the C-10 and the H-1 and the kite balloon A-P.

The last operational D-type, the D-3 was decommissioned by the Army sometime in 1924.

== Operators ==
United States

- United States Navy
- United States Army

== Specifications (typical) ==
General characteristics

- Crew: Four
- Length: 198 ft 0 in (60.37 m)
- Diameter: 42 ft 0 in (12.80 m)
- Height: 58 ft 0 in (17.68 m)
- Volume: 190,000 cu ft (5,380 m^{3})
- Useful lift: 4,340 lb (1,969 kg)
- Powerplant: 2 × Union , 125 hp (93 kW) each

Performance

- Maximum speed: 58 mph (93 km/h, 50 kn)
- Cruise speed: 40 mph (64 km/h, 35 kn)
- Range: 1,480 mi (2,380 km, 1,290 nmi)
- Endurance: 37 hours

Armament

- 1 × .303 Lewis gun
- 4 × 270 lb (122 kg) bombs

== See also ==
- List of airships of the United States Navy
