= Navy balloon A-5598 =

The U.S. Navy balloon A-5598 was an American naval free balloon which went off-course and its crew of three were recorded missing for several weeks.

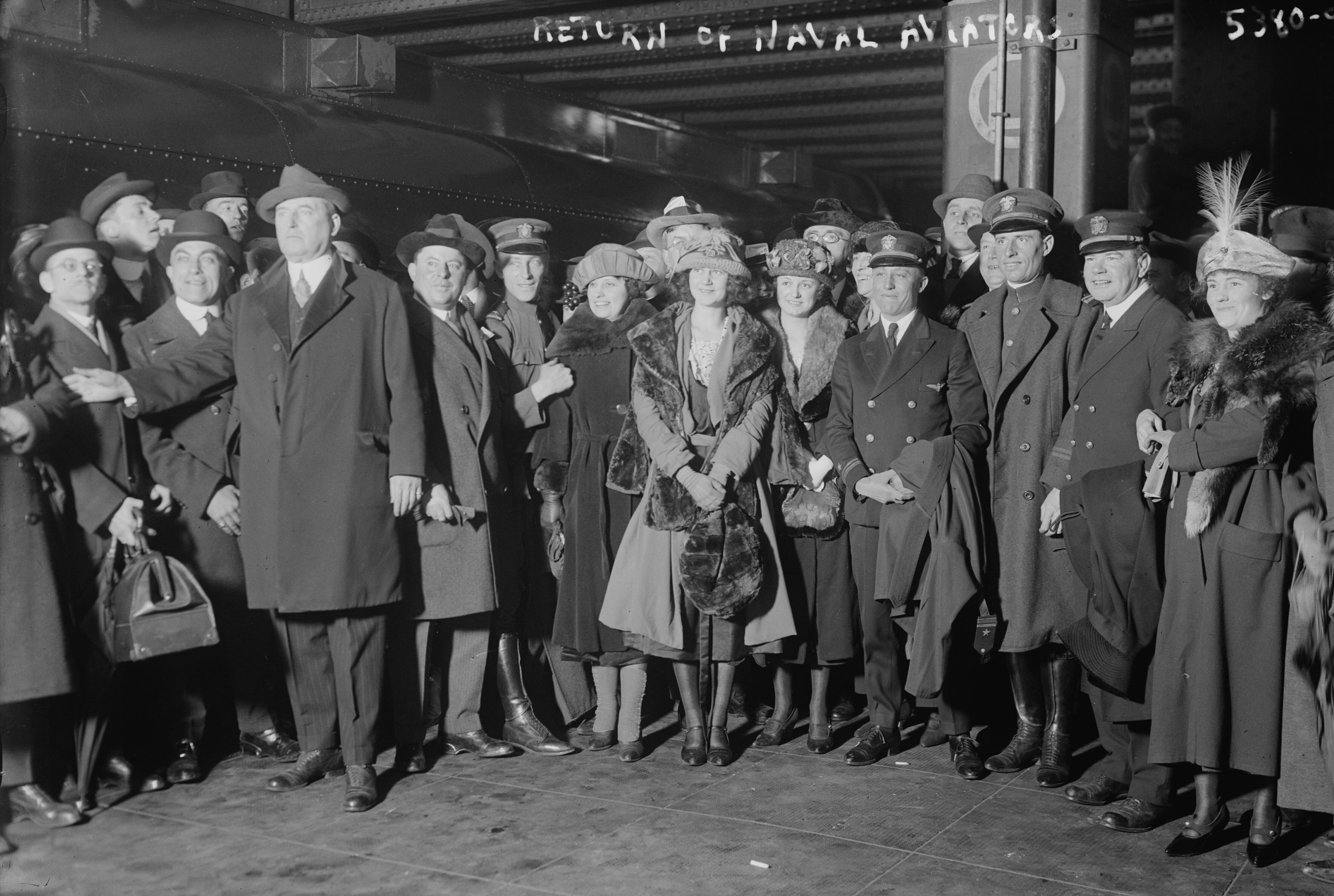
Return of naval aviators

== History ==
The balloon departed Rockaway Naval Air Station (Queens, New York) on December 13, 1920, and went missing the following day. It crash landed 20 miles (32 km) north of Moose Factory, Ontario (Canada).

The balloon was manned by three aeronauts, U.S. Navy Lieutenants Louis A. Kloor, Jr. (mission commander); Stephen A. Farrell (pilot); and Walter Hinton (ground observer).

After a flight of over 25 hours the group, which had narrowly avoiding coming down in the James Bay, was stranded in the wilderness and wandered for four days before they came upon a Cree Indian fur trader. He initially mistook the Americans for Canadian revenue agents but then guided them to safety.

The trio recovered at Moose Factory, and later were brought to the nearest town on a railway line, Mattice (Ontario) on January 11. They returned to a heroes' welcome in New York City on January 14, 1921.

An inquiry by the Navy found that the flight was legitimate and there was no misconduct by the airmen. Hinton and Kloor had written letters home which their families sold to newspapers describing the flight, which prompted the Navy to start enforcing rarely used censorship rules.

== See also ==
- List of accidents and incidents involving military aircraft before 1925
