= SS Patrick S. Mahony =

World War II Liberty ship of the United States

History

United States
- Name: Patrick S. Mahony
- Namesake: Patrick S. Mahony
- Ordered: as type (EC2-S-C1) hull, MC hull 2400
- Builder: J.A. Jones Construction, Brunswick, Georgia
- Cost: $839,185
- Yard number: 185
- Way number: 3
- Laid down: 30 December 1944
- Launched: 10 February 1945
- Sponsored by: Mrs. Christine Mahoney
- Completed: 22 February 1945
- Identification: Call Signal: ANIC
- Fate: Laid up in the National Defense Reserve Fleet, Hudson River Group, 13 September 1945; Laid up in the National Defense Reserve Fleet, Wilmington, North Carolina, 10 December 1947; Sold for scrapping, 19 January 1960

General characteristics
- Class & type: Liberty ship; type EC2-S-C1, standard
- Tonnage: 10,865 LT DWT; 7,176 GRT
- Displacement: 3,380 long tons (3,434 t) (light); 14,245 long tons (14,474 t) (max)
- Length: 441 feet 6 inches (135 m) oa; 416 feet (127 m) pp; 427 feet (130 m) lwl
- Beam: 57 feet (17 m)
- Draft: 27 ft 9.25 in (8.4646 m)
- Installed power: 2 × Oil fired 450 °F (232 °C) boilers, operating at 220 psi (1,500 kPa); 2,500 hp (1,900 kW)
- Propulsion: 1 × triple-expansion steam engine, (manufactured by Hamilton Engineering Works, Brunswick, Georgia); 1 × screw propeller
- Speed: 11.5 knots (21.3 km/h; 13.2 mph)
- Capacity: 562,608 cubic feet (15,931 m^{3}) (grain); 499,573 cubic feet (14,146 m^{3}) (bale)
- Complement: 38–62 USMM; 21–40 USNAG
- Armament: Varied by ship; Bow-mounted 3-inch (76 mm)/50-caliber gun; Stern-mounted 4-inch (102 mm)/50-caliber gun; 2–8 × single 20-millimeter (0.79 in) Oerlikon anti-aircraft (AA) cannons and/or, 2–8 × 37-millimeter (1.46 in) M1 AA guns

SS Patrick S. Mahony was a Liberty ship built in the United States during World War II. She was named after Patrick S. Mahony, who was lost at sea while he was master of M/V J. A. Moffett Jr., after she was torpedoed by German submarine U-571, on 8 July 1942, off Florida.

== Construction ==
Patrick S. Mahony was laid down on 30 December 1944, under a United States Maritime Commission (MARCOM) contract, MC hull 2400, by J.A. Jones Construction, Brunswick, Georgia; she was sponsored by Mrs. L.A. Graves, and launched on 10 February 1945.

== History ==
She was allocated to the Black Diamond Steamship Co., on 22 February 1945. On 13 September 1945, she was laid up in the National Defense Reserve Fleet, in the James River Group. On 10 December 1947, she was laid up in the National Defense Reserve Fleet, in Wilmington, North Carolina. On 19 January 1960, she was sold for $70,318, along with nine other Liberty ships, to Bethlehem Steel, to be scrapped. She was removed from the fleet on 20 February 1960.

== Bibliography ==
- "Jones Construction, Brunswick GA". ShipbuildingHistory.com. 13 October 2010.
- "Liberty Ships – World War II".
- Maritime Administration. "Patrick S. Mahony". Ship History Database Vessel Status Card. U.S. Department of Transportation, Maritime Administration. Archived from the original on 12 December 2019.
- Davies, James (May 2004). "Specifications (As-Built)" (PDF). p. 23.
- "SS Patrick S. Mahony".
