= James Hirshfield =

US Coast Guard admiral (1902–1993)

James A. Hirshfield
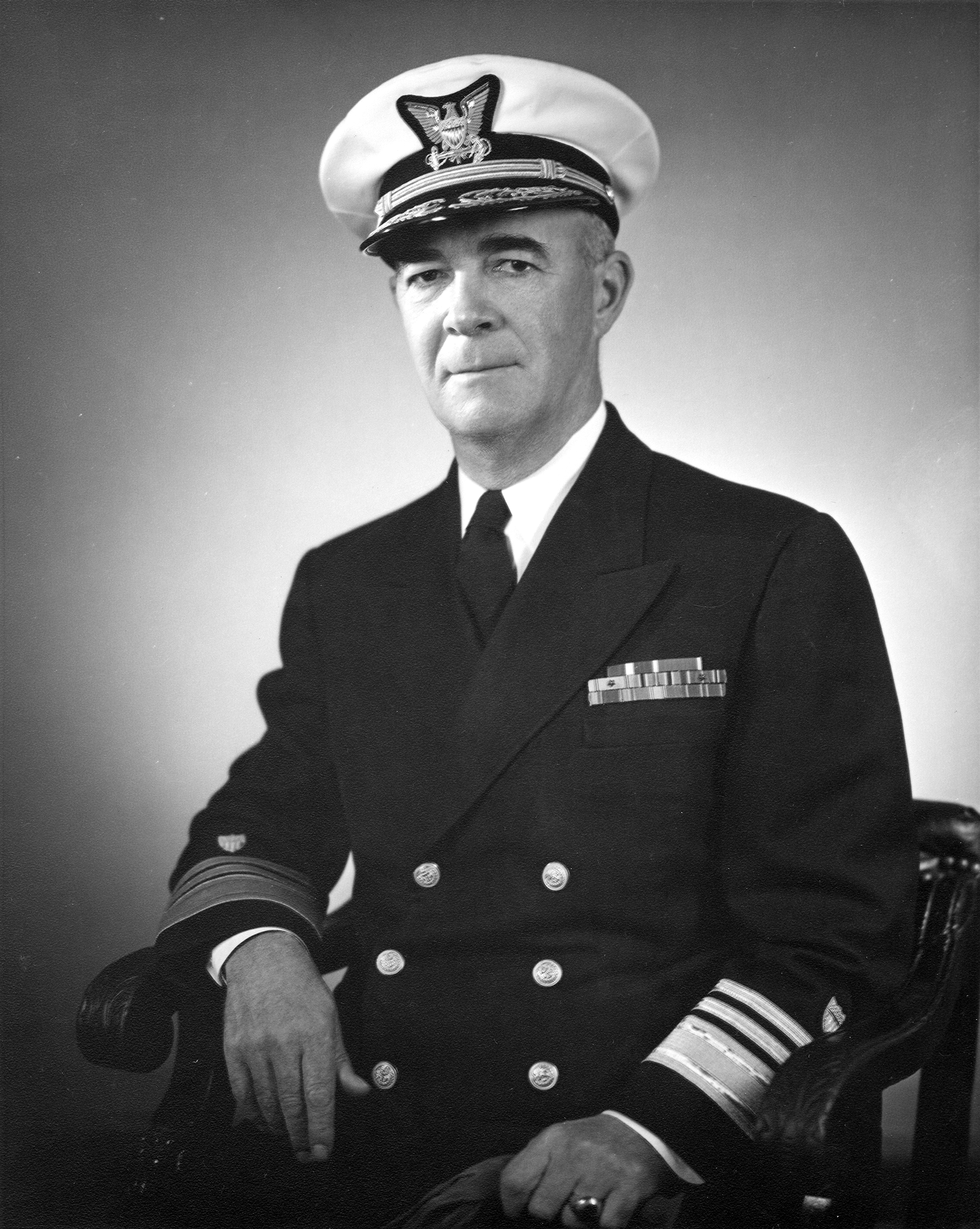
- Born: July 30, 1902; Cincinnati, Ohio, U.S.
- Died: May 16, 1993 (aged 90); Rancho Santa Fe, California, U.S.
- Burial place: Arlington National Cemetery
- Spouse: Marjorie Prentis Hirshfield
- Military career
- Allegiance: United States of America
- Branch: United States Coast Guard
- Service years: 1924–1962
- Rank: Vice admiral
- Conflicts: Battle of Convoy ON 166
- Awards: Navy Cross
- Other work: Assistant Commandant of the Coast Guard, 1954–1962

Vice Admiral James Albert Hirshfield (July 30, 1902 – May 16, 1993) was the sixth Assistant Commandant (now called Vice Commandant) of the United States Coast Guard. During World War II he was the commanding officer of the USCGC Campbell (WPG-32) during a battle with German U-boats, earning the Navy Cross.

== Early life ==
James Albert Hirshfield was born in Cincinnati, Ohio, on 30 July 1902, the son of Eli Albert Hirshfield and Katherine Devine Hirshfield. He received his early education in San Antonio, Texas and graduated from Main Avenue High School. During 1921 and 1922 he attended the University of Texas.

== Early career ==
He was appointed a cadet in the U. S. Coast Guard Academy in July 1922, graduating on 17 October 1924 as an Ensign. Out of the academy, he served nearly nine years of sea duty before being assigned to a shore station. With the Destroyer Force of New London, he served on the Cummings, Henley, Wilkes, Downes, Fanning, and Cassin. From 1930 to 1931 he served on the cutter Tallapoosa and as executive officer on the Destroyer George E. Badger. In 1932, upon her commissioning, he assumed command of Hermes on Atlantic Patrol Duty. He went to the academy in 1934 as an instructor. While there until 1937, he began attending law classes during summer breaks. Upon transfer to Headquarters at Washington, D.C., he attended George Washington University Law School. He received a Bachelor of Law Degree in 1939 and was admitted to the District of Columbia Bar in 1940. LCDR Hirshfield served as commanding officer of the USCGC Onondaga (WPG-79) at Astoria, Oregon, the Maritime Training Ship City of Chattanooga, and then the USCGC Campbell (WPG-32).

== Sinking of U-606 ==
The German submarine U-606, a Type VIIC U-boat, under the command of Oberleutenant Hans-Heinrich Döhler, departed Brest, France on 4 January 1943 for a patrol in the North Atlantic. On 22 February 1943, she torpedoed three merchant ships from the westbound Convoy ON 166, sinking one and damaging the other two. The convoy was under the protection of Escort Group A-3, which consisted of a number of Coast Guard cutters, including USCGC Spencer (WPG-36) and the Campbell. Also among the escorts was the Polish destroyer ORP Burza, commanded by Kapitan Marynarki (LCDR) F. Pitulko, which reinforced the escort group during the voyage across the Atlantic. In the running battle that took shape in and around convoy ON-166, Campbell engaged numerous U-boats, forcing them to submerge and damaging at least two. Her crew then rescued 50 survivors from a torpedoed Norwegian tanker. As the cutter returned to the convoy she detected a contact on radar. Campbell raced toward it and soon made visual contact. It was the surfaced U-606, earlier disabled by depth charges from the Burza. Campbell closed to ram while the cutter's gunners opened fire. Campbell rammed the U-boat with a glancing blow and one of the submarine's hydroplanes sliced open Campbell's hull, flooding the engine room. The crew dropped two depth charges as the submarine slid past, and the explosions lifted the U-boat nearly five feet. Hirshfield later noted, "I felt sure he was ours."

The USCGC Campbell illuminated the U-boat with a spotlight and the gunners continued to fire into the submarine's conning tower and hull. The two vessels were so close, one crewman said that, "You just couldn't miss." Hirshfield was hit by shell fragments but remained at his station. When he realized the Germans had given up, he ordered his men to cease firing. The crew then rescued five of the U-606's crew. The U-606 was finished, but so was Campbell for the immediate future. The cutter was dead in the water with a flooded engine room. Hirshfield directed the repairs while the Burza, and later a corvette, screened it from an attack by a U-boat. The British Tug Tenacity arrived nearly four days later and towed the crippled cutter 800 miles to St. John's Newfoundland. She was later repaired and returned to service. CDR Hirshfield had remained in command throughout the engagement and subsequent operations. He was awarded the Navy Cross for "Extraordinary Heroism and Distinguished Service" as commanding officer of USCGC Campbell.

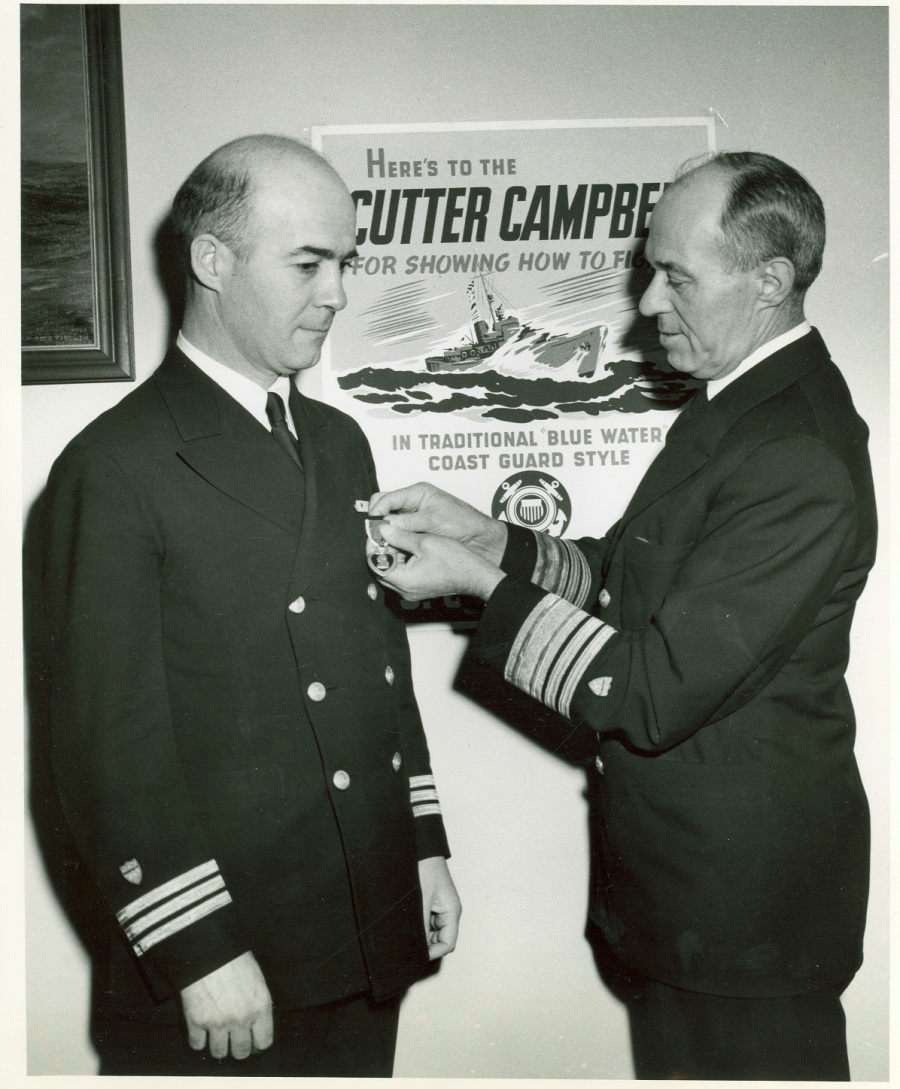
CDR Hirshfield being awarded the Purple Heart by the Commandant, Vice Admiral Russell R. Waesche

Citation:

The President of the United States takes pleasure in presenting the Navy Cross to James A. Hirshfield, Commander, U.S. Coast Guard, for extraordinary heroism and distinguished service in the line of his profession as Commanding Officer of the U.S.S. CAMPBELL (WPG-32) during action against an enemy submarine in the Atlantic War Area on 22 February 1943. Surprising the hostile undersea craft on the surface during escort operations, Commander Hirshfield, in a quick attempt to ram, collided with the vessel and destroyed it in a fierce attack by depth charges and point-blank fire. Although painfully wounded by flying shell splinters, he gallantly remained in command throughout the action and during the subsequent period while the Campbell was towed safely into port with several prisoners from the sunken submarine. Commander Hirshfield's inspiring leadership and the valiant devotion to duty of his command contributed in large measure to the outstanding success of this vital mission and reflects great credit upon the United States Naval Service.

— Citation of the Navy Cross

Hirshfield also received the Purple Heart for injuries sustained in the sinking of U-606.

== Subsequent career ==
Detached from Campbell in May 1943, he served at Headquarters and subsequently commander, 9th Coast Guard District. In 1951 he was appointed Rear Admiral and designated Chief, Office of Personnel. In 1952 he became Flag Officer in Charge of Reserve Affairs. On 1 June 1954 Rear Admiral Hirshfield was sworn in as Assistant Commandant of the U. S. Coast Guard. In 1958 he was appointed Vice Admiral and confirmed in a second 4-year term as Assistant Commandant. In addition to the Navy Cross and Purple Heart, he earned the following World War II campaign and service medals: American Defense; American Area; European-African-Middle Eastern area (l star); World War II Victory. Vice Admiral Hirshfield retired on 1 February 1962, bringing to a close a shining career of nearly 39 years. He was presented the Distinguished Service Medal in recognition of "Exceptionally Meritorious Service" as Chief of Staff and as Assistant Commandant of the Coast Guard.

== Dates of rank ==
Ensign	Lieutenant, Junior Grade	Lieutenant	Lieutenant Commander	Commander	Captain
O-1	O-2	O-3	O-4	O-5	O-6
October 17, 1924	October 17, 1926	October 17, 1928	October 17, 1932	August 17, 1942	December 11, 1943

Commodore	Rear Admiral	Vice Admiral
O-7	O-8	O-9
June 1, 1945 (reverted to captain, February 12, 1948)	October 1, 1951	June 1, 1960

== Retirement ==
After his retirement in 1962, Vice Admiral Hirshfield moved to Cleveland, Ohio, and then to Rancho Santa Fe, California, in 1970.

Vice Admiral Hirshfield died on 16 May 1993 and is buried with his wife Marjorie (1913–2011) in Arlington National Cemetery.
