= USRC Apache =

Cutter of the United States Revenue Service

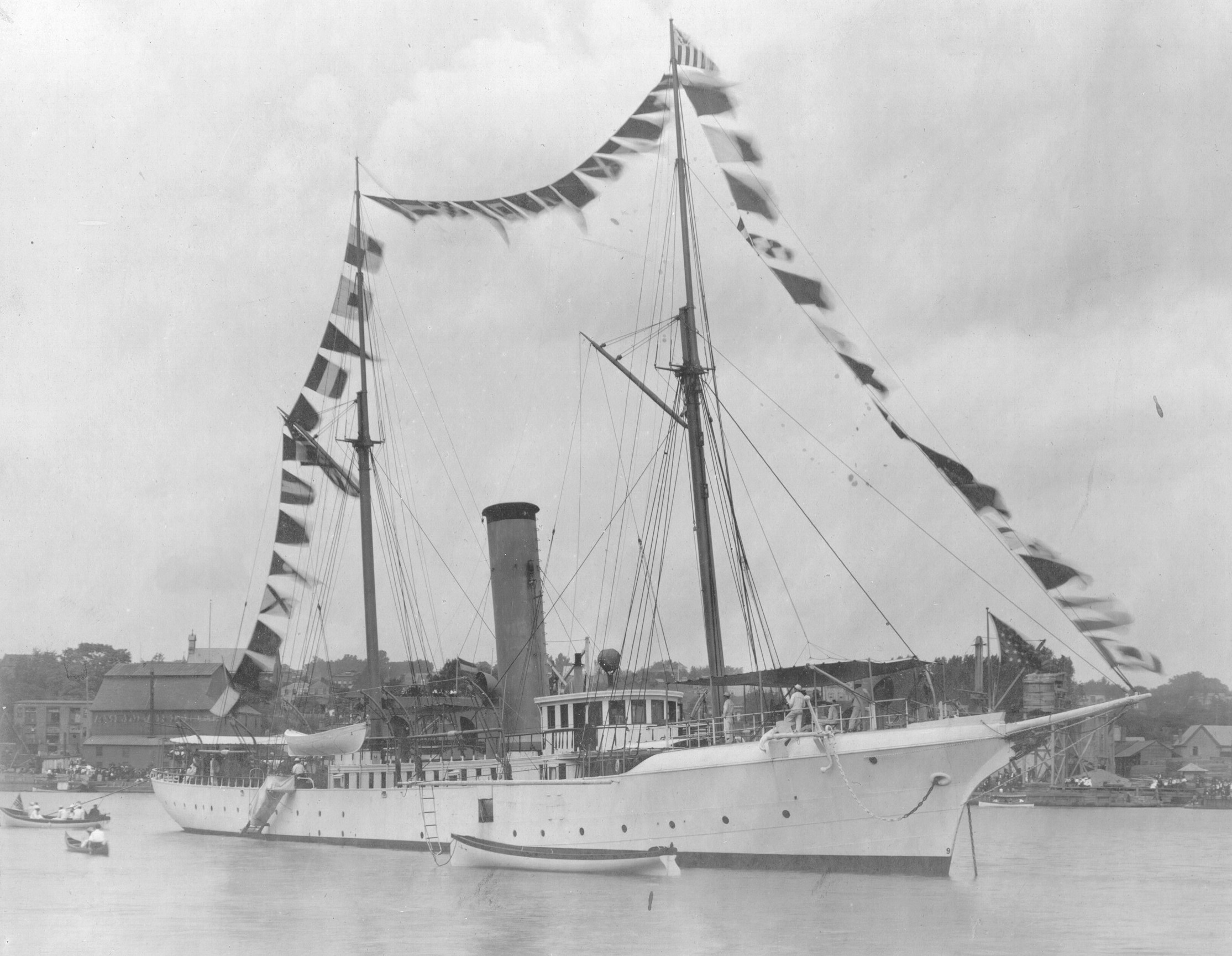

History

United States
- Name: Apache
- Namesake: The Apache, the collective term for several culturally related groups of Native Americans originally from the American Southwest (previous name retained)
- Builder: Reeder and Sons, Baltimore, Maryland
- Cost: US$95,650
- Completed: 1891
- Acquired: 1917 (U.S. Navy)
- Commissioned: 22 August 1891 (as USRC Galveston)
- Decommissioned: 31 December 1937
- Fate: Returned to United States Coast Guard 28 August 1919
- Notes: Served as United States Revenue Cutter Service cutter USRC Galveston 1891–1904 and as USRC Apache 1904–1915; served in U.S. Coast Guard as cutter USCGC Apache 1915–1917 and 1919–1937; U.S. Army during World War II; scrapped 1950

General characteristics
- Type: Patrol vessel
- Displacement: 708 long tons (719 t)
- Length: 185 ft 3 in (56.46 m)
- Beam: 29 ft (8.8 m)
- Draft: 9 ft 3 in (2.82 m) (mean)
- Speed: 12 kn (14 mph; 22 km/h)
- Complement: 58
- Armament: 1 × 3 in (76 mm) gun; 2 × machine guns; 1 × Y-gun depth charge projector (added in 1918)

USRC Apache was a United States Revenue Cutter Service cutter that served in the United States Navy as a patrol vessel from 6 April 1917 to 28 August 1919. During the time she served with the Navy she was known as USS Apache. She was built in 1891 as the United States Revenue Cutter Service cutter USRC Galveston by Reeder and Sons at Baltimore, Maryland. On 30 December 1904, her name was changed to USRC Apache and, upon the creation of the U.S. Coast Guard in 1915, she became USCGC Apache.

== Construction ==
As Galveston she was constructed as an iron-hulled twin-screw vessel powered by a compound-expansion steam engine with one screw per cylinder. In 1904, during a yard availability, she was re-powered with a triple-expansion steam engine and converted to a single screw. (Note: Record of Movements and Canney cite 1904 as the year that Galveston reported to the repair yard for overhaul. The Coast Guard Historian's Office account of the event claims 1900 as the year.) Her original clipper bow was changed to a plumb stem during her rebuilding.

== Service history ==
=== Early history to service with the U.S. Navy during World War I ===
Apache was placed in commission on 22 August 1891 and ordered to Wilmington, North Carolina for temporary duty. On 2 October she was ordered to report to Galveston, Texas as a permanent assignment, arriving 20 October. Her assigned cruising area was from Port Eads, Louisiana to the Rio Grande River. In October 1897, Apache was quarantined at Sabine Pass, Texas because of an outbreak of yellow fever along the Texas coast including Galveston. On 22 April 1898 as a result of the declaration of war on Spain by the United States, Apache was ordered to New Orleans to assist with the defense of the city. She remained there until 30 July when she was relieved, arriving 7 August at Galveston. On 13 July 1899 she was ordered to assist flood sufferers in the Brazos River area as a result of Tropical Storm One On 30 April 1907 she struck the anchored barge C. T. Rowland in fog in Chesapeake Bay at the lower end of the Craighill Channel.

=== U.S. Navy Service ===
Apache entered U.S. Navy service after the U.S. entered World War I in April 1917 and the Coast Guard came under U.S. Navy control for the duration of the war. Coast Guardsmen from Apache and USRC Algonquin assisted U.S. Marshals in seizing 3 German steamships; 11,440-ton Bulgaria, 10,058-ton Rhein, and 9,835-ton Necker which were interned at Baltimore, Maryland after the Declaration of war on Germany She was assigned to the 5th Naval District and patrolled Chesapeake Bay until the end of the war. In December 1918 she was fitted out as a minesweeper and assigned a homeport at Charleston, South Carolina. Additional duties assigned to Apache during her assignment at Charleston was as a training ship for newly commissioned U.S. Navy ensigns, giving them operational experience with minesweeping evolutions as well as the occasional duty to aid vessels in distress.

Apache returned to U.S. Coast Guard control when the Coast Guard was returned to the jurisdiction of the U.S. Department of the Treasury on 28 August 1919. She remained active in the Coast Guard until 1937, then saw service with the United States Army as a radio Transmitter ship in the Pacific during World War II. In October 1944, Apache broadcast General Douglas MacArthur's "I have returned" speech. She was scrapped in 1950.

== Notes ==
=== References used ===
- Annual report of the Supervising Inspector General, Steamboat Inspection Service to the Secretary of Commerce for the Fiscal Year Ended June 30, 1908. Washington, D.C.: U.S. Government Printing Office. 1908.
- "Apache, 1891; ex-Galveston". Browse by Topic. U.S. Coast Guard Historian's Office.
- "Record of Movements, Vessels of the United States Coast Guard, 1790–December 31, 1933" (PDF). Historic Documents. U.S. Coast Guard Historian's Office.
- Larzelere, Alex (2003). The Coast Guard in World War I: An Untold Story. Naval Institute Press, Annapolis, Maryland. ISBN 978-1-55750-476-0.
- Canney, Donald L. (1995). U.S. Coast Guard and Revenue Cutters, 1790–1935. Naval Institute Press, Annapolis, Maryland. ISBN 978-1-55750-101-1.
