= USRC Onondaga =

U.S. Revenue Cutter Service ship

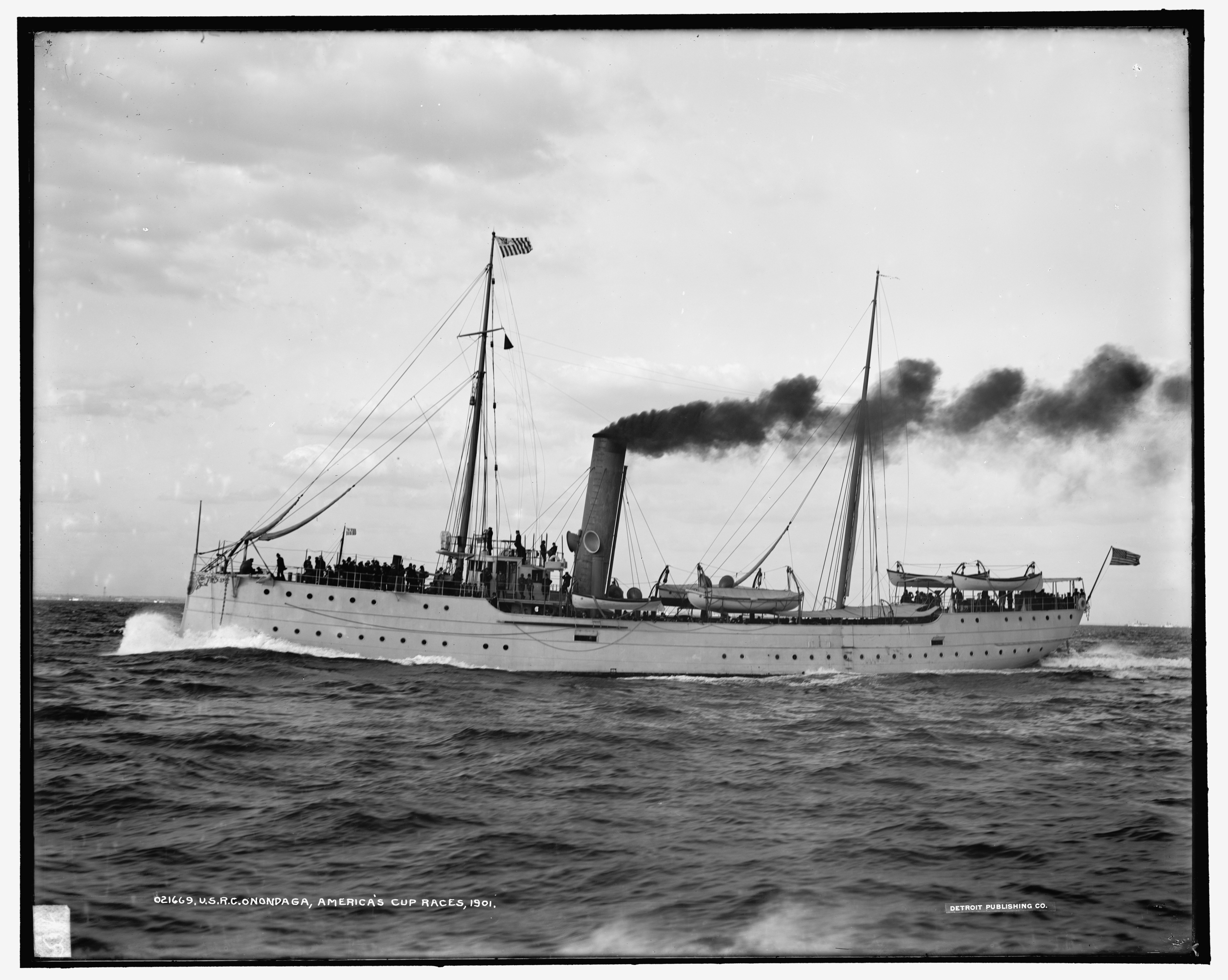
- USRC Onondaga during 1901 America's Cup.

History

United States
- Name: Onondaga
- Namesake: Onondaga
- Operator: U.S. Revenue Cutter Service (1898–1915); U.S. Coast Guard (1915-1923)
- Awarded: 30 March 1897
- Builder: Globe Iron Works Company, Cleveland
- Cost: US$193,800
- Yard number: 72
- Launched: 23 December 1897
- Sponsored by: Miss Louis Augusta Allen
- Completed: 13 August 1898
- Commissioned: 24 October 1898
- Decommissioned: 1 January 1923
- Fate: Sold for scrap, 16 September 1924

General characteristics
- Displacement: 1,192 long tons (1,211 t)
- Length: 205 ft 6 in (62.64 m)
- Beam: 32 ft (9.8 m)
- Draft: 13 ft 2 in (4.01 m)
- Installed power: Triple-expansion steam engine
- Speed: 16 knots (max)
- Complement: 73
- Armament: 4 × 6-pounder rapid-fire guns (1915)

USRC Onondaga was an Algonquin-class cutter built for the U.S. Revenue Cutter Service for service on the Great Lakes. Because of the Spanish–American War, she was cut in half shortly before completion and transported to Ogdensburg, New York for service on the Atlantic coast although the war ended before she could be put into service. After the formation of the United States Coast Guard in 1915 she became USCGC Onondaga. She served as a patrol vessel at various Atlantic coast ports before World War I and unlike most Coast Guard cutters during World War I, she remained under the control of the Commandant of the Coast Guard. After the war she patrolled for a brief time based at New London, Connecticut before being decommissioned in 1923.

== Construction ==
The United States Revenue Cutter Service cutter Onondaga was laid down in 1897 at the Globe Iron Works Company's yard in Cleveland (yard number 72) and launched on 23 December 1897, with Miss Louis Augusta Allen being the sponsor. She was a steel-hulled vessel equipped with a triple-expansion steam engine, Scotch boilers, and a single screw. She was one of the first RCS cutters built with electric generators to supply current for lights and call bells. Before Onondaga could be completed, she was transferred to U.S. Navy control because of the outbreak of the Spanish–American War on 24 March 1898 and the contractor was directed to cut the ship in half for transport to Ogdensburg, New York. She was reassembled and was finally accepted for service by the government 13 August and returned to Department of the Treasury control on 17 August at the conclusion of hostilities. She was placed in commission 24 October at Ogdensburg and ordered to report for duty at Boston, Massachusetts.

== History ==
=== 1899–1917 ===
After Onondaga arrived at Boston, she received winter cruising orders to patrol the area from the St. Croix River to Nantucket Shoals. During February 1899, she was tasked with breaking ice in the harbor at Sullivan, Maine. On 8 December 1899, she received orders transferring her to Philadelphia, Pennsylvania, with a patrol area set from Great Egg Harbor to Fort Monroe, Virginia, including Delaware Bay. While stationed at Philadelphia, she also had a temporary assignment escorting Marine Hospital Service ship Senator from Hampton Roads, Virginia, to Havana, Cuba, in June 1900. In September 1900 she was temporarily assigned to Galveston, Texas. Onondaga was also used to cover other Revenue Cutter Service cutters′ patrol areas when they were laid up for repairs. On 1 July 1902, Onondaga conveyed Maine United States Senator William P. Frye and his party from New York City to Portland, Maine. On 7 April 1904, she received orders to return to Galveston, Texas, and tow USRC Galveston to the Revenue Cutter Service Depot at Curtis Bay, Maryland, for major repairs. (Note: The major overhaul of Galveston also included a name change; she was renamed Apache 30 December 1904) On 10 December 1904, the tug Boxer collided with Onondaga at Philadelphia, striking her stern and necessitating that Onondaga undergo extensive repairs at Kensington Shipyard Company in Philadelphia. Repairs were completed 7 February 1905, and she departed for Norfolk, Virginia, to patrol for the remainder of her winter cruise. On 11 November 1905 she was notified that all winter patrols were to be based out of Norfolk while summer patrols were to be conducted out of Philadelphia. After 13 April 1907, all patrols were based out of Norfolk, with occasional temporary duty at Tompkinsville on Staten Island, New York, while the cutters normally stationed there were in shipyards for repairs. On 29 October 1907 she had a wireless telegraph installed at Norfolk.

On 7 June 1909, Onondaga was placed out of commission at the Revenue Cutter Service Depot for repairs. She sailed without commission to Norfolk for additional repairs and returned to the Revenue Cutter Service Depot 30 September 1909. Repairs were completed 6 November 1909, and she recommissioned and returned to normal patrol duties. On 6 March 1910, USRC Mohawk assisted by Onondaga, towed the abandoned and waterlogged four-masted schooner Asbury Fountain to Norfolk after Asbury Fountain collided with the steamer SS Jamestown. On 23 May 1912, Onondaga was at Philadelphia, representing the Revenue Cutter Service at the convention of the Permanent International Association of Navigation Congresses. On 9 May 1913, Onondaga received United States Secretary of the Treasury William Gibbs McAdoo and his party aboard for a cruise from Baltimore, Maryland, to Richmond, Virginia.

On 9 October 1913, the steel-hulled bark Manga Reva departed Philadelphia, Pennsylvania, bound for San Francisco, California, via Cape Horn with a cargo of coal, but about a week after she cleared Delaware Bay, her crew of 28 men mutinied while she was in the Atlantic Ocean 600 nautical miles (1,100 km) east of Bermuda. The mutineers forced her captain and other officers to sail her back toward Philadelphia. On 9 November 1913, she anchored inside the breakwater off Lewes, Delaware, in the midst of a gale. The weather prevented the pilot who came aboard from guiding her up the Delaware Bay to Philadelphia, and as he disembarked Manga Reva′s captain, despite warnings from the mutineers not to mention the mutiny, slipped him a note asking for help. The pilot notified the Philadelphia Navy Yard at League Island in Philadelphia of the mutiny, and the navy yard promptly radioed Onondaga. In response, Onondaga made for Lewes at full speed. With a small crowd of onlookers from Lewes using telescopes to observe the action from the beach, Onondaga arrived on the scene on 10 November 1913 and fastened herself to Manga Reva with grappling hooks. Members of Onondaga′s crew leaped over the rail and onto the deck of Manga Reva and found the mutineers gathered on Manga Reva′s quarterdeck armed with sheath knives and other weapons they had found, shouting defiance at Onondaga′s crew. More Onondaga crewmen came aboard Manga Reva armed with rifles and fixed bayonets. The mutineers, intoxicated from drinking Manga Reva′s liquor supply overnight, retreated, and within five minutes, and with no shots fired, Onondaga′s crew brought the mutiny to an end and arrested the mutineers.

On 5 August 1914, at the outbreak of World War I in Europe, Onondaga was authorized for duty in enforcing neutrality laws in the Chesapeake Bay area. On 19 October 1914 she was placed out of commission at the Revenue Cutter Service Depot for overhaul, and her crew transferred to the Revenue Cutter Service Academy training ship USRC Itasca When the Revenue Cutter Service merged with the United States Life-Saving Service to form the United States Coast Guard on 28 January 1915, Onondaga became a United States Coast Guard cutter, designated as USCGC Onondaga. She was recommissioned on 29 January 1915 and her crew returned to her from Itasca.

In the spring of 1915, the Italian steamer Verona arrived at the immigration station at Cape Henlopen, Delaware, carrying several hundred immigrants and, after immigration authorities discovered a suspected case of smallpox on board, the immigrants were confined to the quarantine station at Cape Henlopen. Many of the immigrants were eager to reach New York City in time to celebrate Easter Sunday with relatives on 4 April 1915, and about 200 of them pushed through the wire and past the guards at the quarantine station and arrived at the train station 3 miles (4.8 km) away in Lewes, demanding tickets to Philadelphia, but the station manager held them at bay with a pistol. Onondaga arrived at Lewes and disembarked a detachment of 50 United States Marines carrying rifles with fixed bayonets, prompting the unarmed immigrants to return to the quarantine station. The following day, a steamer arrived to take the immigrants to Philadelphia.

During the summer of 1915, Lieutenants Elmer F. Stone and Norman B. Hall of Onondaga proposed the use of airplanes to increase the search capabilities of the cutter in locating overdue fishing schooners. With the approval of Onondaga′s commanding officer, Captain Benjamin M. Chiswell, they flew scouting missions in an airplane loaned to them by a representative of the Curtiss Aeroplane Company. On 16 October 1915, Onondaga was assigned a winter patrol area from Great Egg Harbor, New Jersey, to Cape Hatteras, North Carolina, with a home port of Cape Lookout, North Carolina. On 17 October 1916 her patrol area was changed to Cape Romain, South Carolina, to Cape Canaveral, Florida, with her home port at Savannah, Georgia. She patrolled this area until being recalled to the United States Coast Guard Depot on 31 March 1917. On 5 April 1917 she was decommissioned in preparation for transfer to the United States Navy for service in World War I.

=== World War I ===
After 6 April 1917, the Coast Guard was placed under the control of the Department of the Navy by executive order; however, Onondaga was unique among the cutters in the Coast Guard in that she was never assigned to a naval district commandant but instead received her orders directly from the Commandant of the Coast Guard. After re-commissioning on 18 May 1917, she sailed for New London, Connecticut where Captain Frederick C. Billard, also superintendent of the Coast Guard Academy, took command of her. Onondaga was used to convoy vessels turned over for use by the Coast Guard during the war from one port to another and to transfer personnel between units. She also was used to train newly recruited enlistees and cadets at the academy and for towing disabled vessels to shipyards for repair.

On 20 February 1918, Onondaga rescued the entire crew of the British steamship SS Veturia after she foundered on Diamond Shoals off the North Carolina coast. Captain Billard maneuvered Onondaga close by the grounded Veturia in heavy seas and dense fog and one of the small boats from Onondaga made seven trips rescuing the stranded crew of the grounded ship. Captain Billard and his crew received a commendation from the British Admiralty. The owners of the Veturia, Gow, Harrison and Company, sent a letter to the Secretary of the Navy, Josephus Daniels, expressing appreciation for the rescue. While on patrol near Montauk Point on 13 March 1918, she came to the aid of SS Kershaw, taking some of the crew off the stricken ship and placing them aboard USRC Tuscarora.

=== Post-war service and decommissioning ===
On 28 August 1919 the Coast Guard was returned to Department of the Treasury control. Onondaga continued patrol operations based out of New London until 1920, at which time she transferred to Baltimore. She continued to operate out of Baltimore until 1 January 1923, when she was placed out of commission at the Coast Guard Depot for repairs. Funding for needed repairs was never received and her condition gradually deteriorated to the point where she had to be sold for scrap. She was sold 16 September 1924 to Charles A. Jording of Baltimore for US$7,840. (Note: Colton claims that after being sold Onondaga was converted to a barge.)
