= Naval Air Station Rockaway =

Coordinates: 40°34′6″N 73°52′21″W

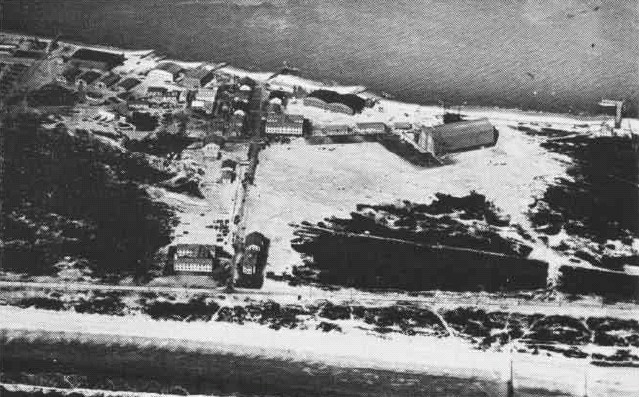
Aerial view of NAS Rockaway in 1917

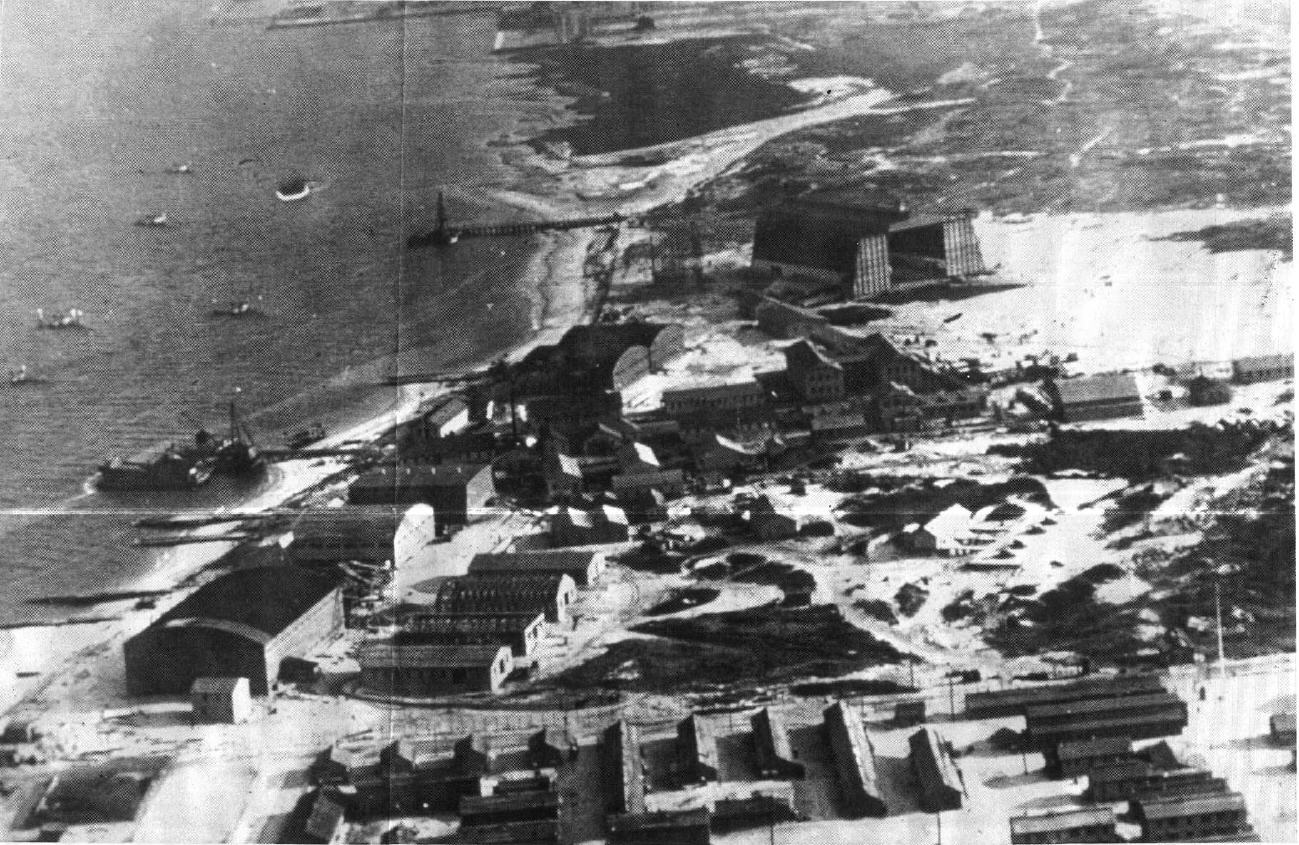
Aerial view of NAS Rockaway in 1919 looking eastward with view of airship hangar.

Naval Air Station Rockaway was a United States Navy aviation facility in the New York City borough of Queens. Located next to Fort Tilden on the western portion of the Rockaway Peninsula, it operated from 1917 to 1930. In 1919, it was the departure point for the first transatlantic flight.

== History ==
The air station was established in 1917, during the American involvement in World War I, on transferred municipal property.

Two years later, the station was the departure point for the first transatlantic flight, executed by the crew of the NC-4. On November 27, 1918, the NC-1 took off from the station with 51 people aboard, establishing a new world record for persons carried in flight.

In 1920, U.S. Navy balloon A-5598 departed for the air station. It went off-course and its crew of three were recorded missing for several weeks, lost in the Canadian wilderness.

On August 31, 1921, an airship hangar caught fire. It destroyed the D-6 blimp along with two small dirigibles, the C-10 and the H-1 and the kite balloon A-P. The D-6 was built by the Naval Aircraft Factory, Philadelphia, Pennsylvania, to a design somewhat different from the other five D-class airships. It featured an improved control car (the "D-1 Enclosed Cabin Car) which had a watertight bottom for landings on water, and internal fuel tanks.

The station was demolished in 1930 to make way for Jacob Riis Park. Operations were moved across the inlet to a hangar in the municipal Floyd Bennett Field, which itself was sold to the federal government in 1941 and made Naval Air Station New York. In turn, NAS New York was decommissioned in 1972 and is now a part of the Gateway National Recreation Area, as are Fort Tilden and Jacob Riis Park.
