= USRC Gresham =

U.S. Revenue Service cutter

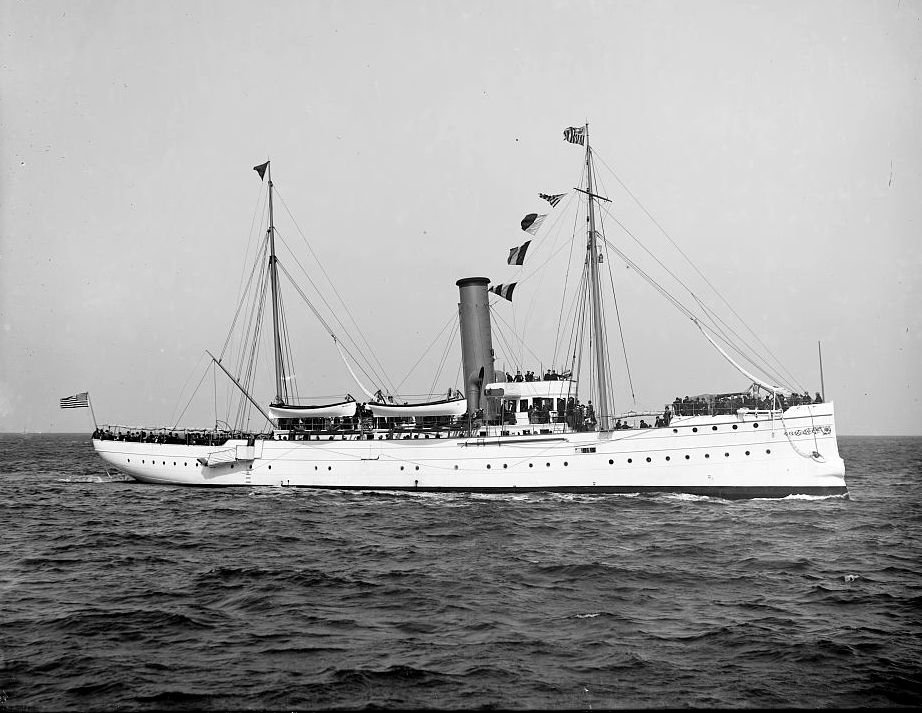
- Gresham circa 1901

History

United States
- Name: Gresham
- Namesake: Walter Q. Gresham (1832–1895), United States Secretary of State (1893-1895)
- Operator: U.S. Revenue Cutter Service (1897–1915); U.S. Coast Guard (1915–1935, 1943–1944)
- Awarded: 27 June 1895
- Builder: Globe Iron Works, Cleveland
- Cost: US$147,800
- Launched: 12 September 1896
- Completed: 10 February 1897
- Commissioned: 30 May 1897
- Decommissioned: 7 April 1944
- Home port: Milwaukee
- Fate: Acquired by Israel 1947, scrapped 1951

General characteristics
- Displacement: 1,090 long tons (1,110 t)
- Length: 205 ft 6 in (62.64 m)
- Beam: 32 ft (9.8 m)
- Draft: 12 ft 6 in (3.81 m)
- Installed power: Triple-expansion steam engine
- Speed: 18 knots (design)
- Complement: 9 officers, 63 men
- Armament: 2 × 6-pounder, 1 × 1-pounder, 3 × 0.50-cal. machine gun, 1 bow torpedo tube

USRC Gresham was a cruising cutter and auxiliary gunboat built for the United States Revenue Cutter Service to patrol the Great Lakes. She was one of a series of cutters named for former U.S. Secretaries of the Treasury. Her namesake Walter Q. Gresham served as the 35th Secretary of the Treasury in 1884 and died in 1895 while serving as the 33rd U.S. Secretary of State. She became part of the newly created United States Coast Guard in 1915, and also served as a coastal convoy escort and patrol boat under United States Navy control during both World War I and World War II. After being decommissioned by the Coast Guard in 1944, she eventually came under Israeli control in 1947. She carried Jewish refugees from Italy to Palestine and later served in the fledgling Israeli Navy until 1951.

== Construction ==
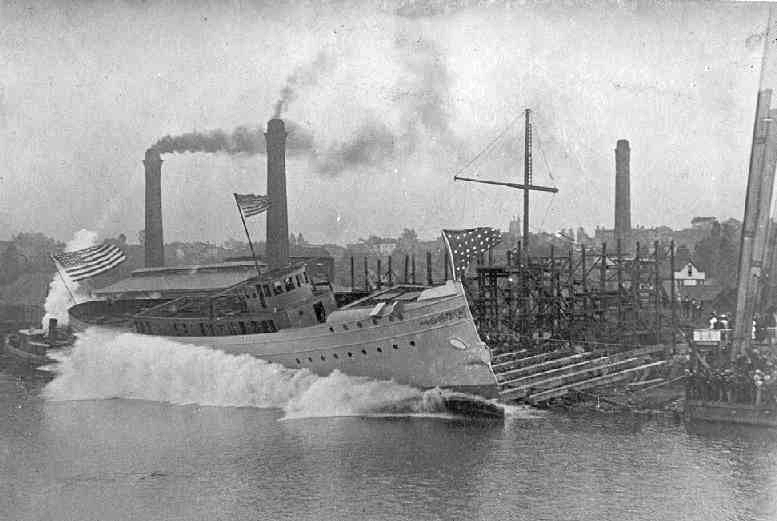
Launching of Gresham at Cleveland in 1896

The U.S. Revenue Cutter Service cutter was built by the Globe Iron Works in Cleveland. She was launched on 12 September 1896 and accepted by the Revenue Cutter Service on 10 February 1897.

== History ==
=== 1897–1898 ===
On 30 May 1897, she was commissioned as USRC Walter Q. Gresham. (Her name was shortened to USRC Gresham in 1904.) The new cutter was given a homeport in Milwaukee and assigned to patrol Lake Michigan. Because of her modern armament, the Canadian government protested that her construction and deployment there were a violation of both the 1817 Rush–Bagot Treaty and the 1842 Webster–Ashburton Treaty which govern militarization of the Great Lakes. On 22 July 1897, she participated in the dedication ceremony for the General John Logan Memorial in Chicago.

=== Spanish–American War ===
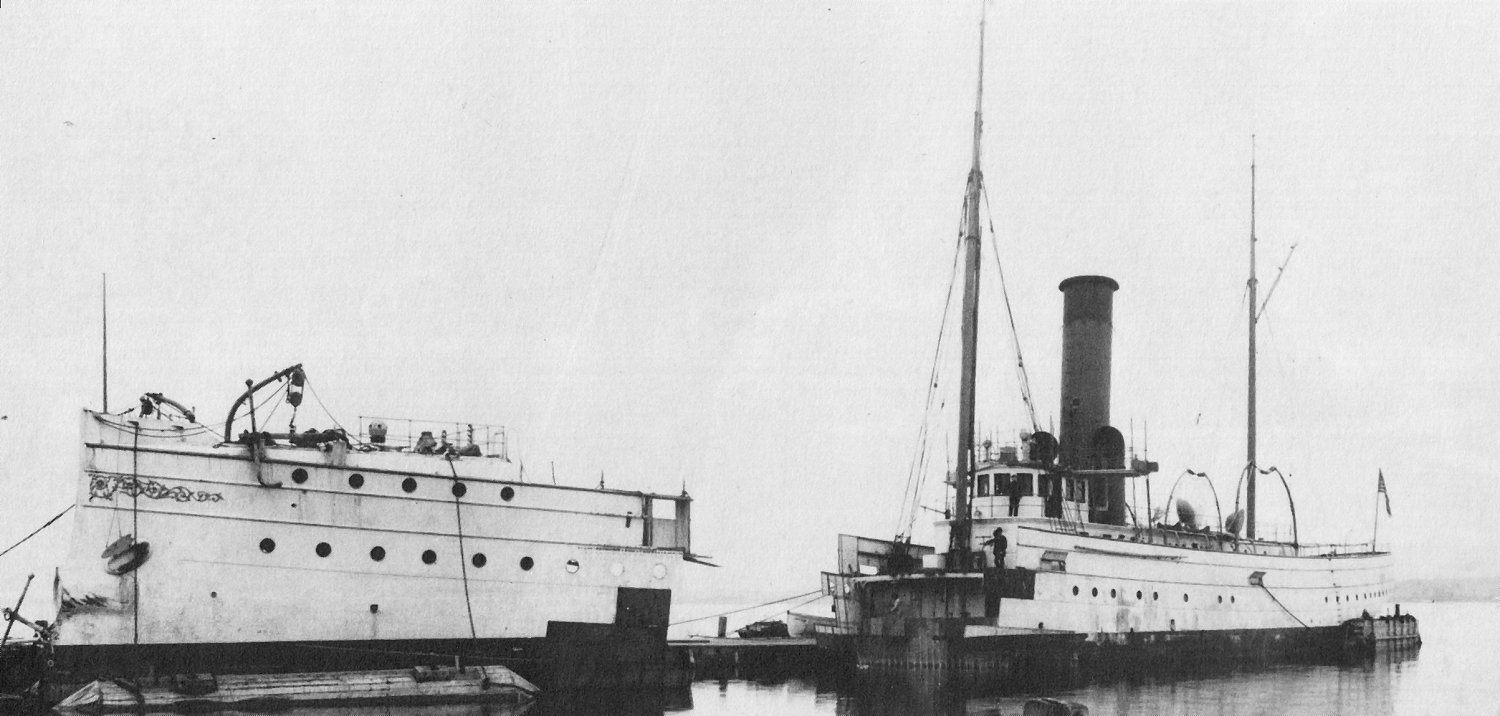
Gresham during transport from the Great Lakes to the Atlantic coast in 1898

On 24 March 1898, Gresham was placed under U.S. Navy control. She was cut in half and transported on barges through the Saint Lawrence locks for service on the Atlantic coast, although the war ended before she could see any action.

=== 1898–1915 ===
On 17 August 1898, she was returned to the Department of the Treasury and assigned patrol duties along the Atlantic coast. On 23 January 1909, Gresham came to the aid of RMS Republic after receiving the first-ever wireless distress signal when she collided with SS Florida near Nantucket.

On 16 December 1910 schooner Abbie G. Cole was wrecked on Stone Horse Shoal, Gresham rescued her crew. An hour or two later she rescued the crew of Canadian Schooner S. A. Fownes just before she sank in a gale 5 or 6 miles south east of Monomoy Island having been blown over Pollock Rip Shoal earlier. Nine members of Gresham's crew received a Revenue Cutter Service Silver Lifesaving Medal for their efforts in the rescue of Fownes crew on 4 March 1914.

On 1 November 1913, the Gloucester fishing schooner Annie M. Parker ran aground on Rose and Crown Shoal near Nantucket. Fearing that the ship would break up in the heavy surf, the fifteen crewmembers abandoned their vessel in four small boats. The boat carrying Capt. Vincent Nelson and three sailors disappeared during the night, while the ship's cook was lost overboard from another boat. On the following day, the surviving crewmembers were rescued by the schooner Tilton bound from Jacksonville, Florida, to Portland, Maine, with a cargo of lumber. Two days later, Annie M. Parker was sighted by the British steamer Astrakhan bound for Dunkirk. She was still fully rigged except for a missing jib and had floated free of the shoal otherwise undamaged. Astrakhan secured the derelict and left crewmembers to claim salvage rights on the $8,000 of salted cod in her hold before continuing on to France. On 5 November, Gresham towed the fishing schooner to New Bedford, Massachusetts. The fate of the missing crew was not known until Tilton arrived in Portland.

=== 1915–1917 ===
After becoming a U.S. Coast Guard cutter in 1915, Gresham continued her patrol duties until placed under U.S. Navy control on 6 April 1917.

=== World War I ===
Gresham was refitted with three 4-inch guns and sixteen 300-lb depth charges. She then served as a coastal convoy escort and patrol gunboat during the war. On 27 October 1917, Capt. B. H. Camden and several Gresham crewmembers received letters of commendation for having come to the aid of the five-masted schooner Dorothy Palmer. On 3 September 1918, Captain B. M. Chiswell, gunner F. W. Sarnow and boatswain H. B. Berg received letters of commendation for destroying the wreck of the four-masted schooner Madrugada off Winter Quarter Shoal near Virginia after she had been attacked by SM U-117 on 15 August.

=== 1919–1935 ===
After the Coast Guard was returned to the Department of the Treasury by the Navy on 28 August 1919, Gresham continued to serve until decommissioned on 19 January 1935. In November 1930, she was transferred from the Atlantic coast to a new homeport at Mobile, Alabama. In September 1933, Gresham was temporarily assigned to the U.S. Navy Special Service Squadron for two months patrolling the Florida Straits near Cuba.

=== 1943–1944 ===
In 1943, she was recommissioned USCGC Gresham (WPG-85) for service as a coastal convoy escort and guard ship. Her maximum speed of only 8 knots limited her usefulness as a convoy escort. Gresham was decommissioned on 7 April 1944.

=== 1944–1946 ===
The U.S. Merchant Marine Academy at Kings, Point, New York acquired Gresham as a training ship for the academy until a newer surplus vessel replaced it in 1946.

=== Israeli service ===
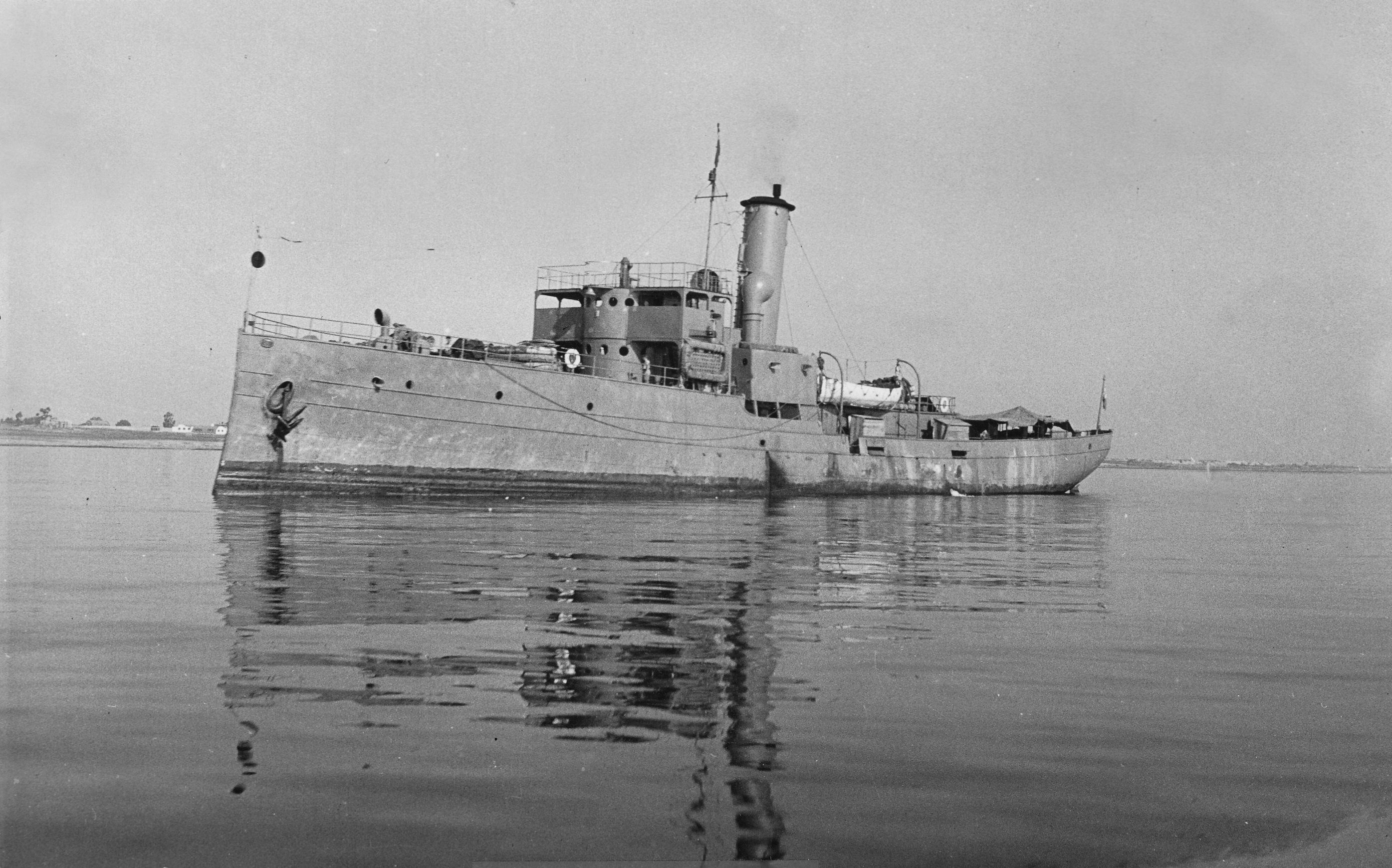
INS Hatikvah (K-22) in 1949

She was acquired by Mossad LeAliyah Bet in February 1947 and renamed Hatikvah (The Hope). In May 1947, she carried 1,414 Jewish refugees from Italy to Haifa. The crew and passengers were arrested by the British authorities and interned in Cyprus.
