= USRC Algonquin =

Ship of the U.S. Revenue Cutter Service

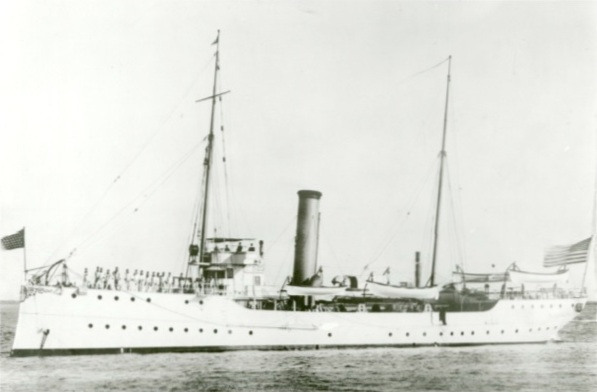

History

United States
- Name: Algonquin
- Operator: U.S. Revenue Cutter Service (1898–1915); U.S. Coast Guard (1915-1930)
- Builder: Globe Iron Works, Cleveland
- Cost: US$193,800
- Yard number: 71
- Laid down: 1897
- Launched: 30 March 1897
- Commissioned: 20 June 1898
- Decommissioned: 11 December 1930
- Fate: Sold, 1930; later U.S. Navy YAG–29, scrapped 1948

General characteristics
- Displacement: 1,181 long tons (1,200 t)
- Length: 205 ft 6 in (62.64 m)
- Beam: 32 ft (9.8 m)
- Draft: 13 ft 2 in (4.01 m)
- Propulsion: Triple-expansion steam engine
- Speed: 16 knots (max)
- Complement: 10 officers, 63 enlisted
- Armament: 2 × 6-pounder

USRC Algonquin was an Algonquin-class cutter built for the U.S. Revenue Cutter Service for service on the Great Lakes. Because of the Spanish–American War, she was cut in half shortly before completion and transported to Ogdensburg, New York for service on the Atlantic coast although the war ended before she could be put into service. She was homeported at San Juan, Puerto Rico from 1905 to 1917. Algonquin served briefly for the U.S. Navy along the Atlantic Coast in the summer of 1898 before being returned to the Treasury Department. After the formation of the United States Coast Guard in 1915 the vessel became USCGC Algonquin. The ship served as a patrol vessel at Norfolk, Virginia at the beginning of World War I before being assigned convoy duty in the Mediterranean. In February 1919 Algonquin was transferred to the West Coast and served in the Pacific Northwest and Alaska until being decommissioned at San Francisco in December 1930.

== Construction ==
The United States Revenue Cutter Service cutter Algonquin was planned and designed by RCS officers and laid down in 1897 at the Globe Iron Works's yard in Cleveland (yard number 71) and launched on 30 March 1897. Algonquin was a steel-hulled vessel equipped with a triple-expansion steam engine, Scotch boilers, and a single screw. She was one of the first RCS cutters built with electric generators to supply current for lights and call bells. She was one of the last RCS cutters that was rigged for sails and had a bow torpedo tube installed. Before Algonquin could be completed, she was transferred to U.S. Navy control on 24 March 1898 due to the Spanish-American War. The ship was cut in half and moved to Ogdensburg, New York. (Note: Algonquin was 205 feet 6 inches (62.64 metres) in length and the locks of the original Beauharnois Canal on the St. Lawrence River at Quebec, Canada were only 180 feet (55 metres) in length in 1898.) Algonquin was reassembled at Montreal, Canada and served briefly in coastal service. On 17 August 1898 the Algonquin was returned to the Treasury Department.

== History ==
=== September 1898 – December 1930 ===
On 8 September 1898, Algonquin was ordered to Philadelphia and thereafter to the Delaware Breakwater to receive a gun from USRC Levi Woodbury. In December, Algonquin was put in service between Norfolk, Virginia and New York and between Norfolk and Cape Hatteras. On 19 January 1899 Algonquin sailed to Havana, Cuba to tow a barge for the Marine Hospital Service. Algonquin made arrived at Havana on 1 March and returned to Norfolk on 23 March.

In the following months Algonquin went to Wilmington, North Carolina to cruise between Cape Hatteras and Charleston, South Carolina. On 5 May 1900, Algonquin searched for the crew of the shipwrecked British steamer Virginia.

When President Woodrow Wilson asked the Congress of the United States for a declaration war against Germany on 6 April 1917, the Coast Guard was transferred to the jurisdiction of the U.S. Navy. After finishing a refit at the shipyard at Arundel Cove, Curtis Bay, Maryland, Algonquin returned to service for five months of service out of Norfolk, Virginia. Late in September, Algonquin began a 16-month tour of duty in Europe, safely escorting 750 ships on ten round trips between Gibraltar and the United Kingdom and 10 round trips between Gibraltar and the Azores. Algonquin was returned to Department of the Treasury control on 28 August 1919, after its arrival in the 13th Naval District where it served in Alaska and the Pacific. Algonquin was decommissioned at San Francisco on 11 December 1930.
