= USRC Androscoggin =

Ship of the U.S. Revenue Cutter Service

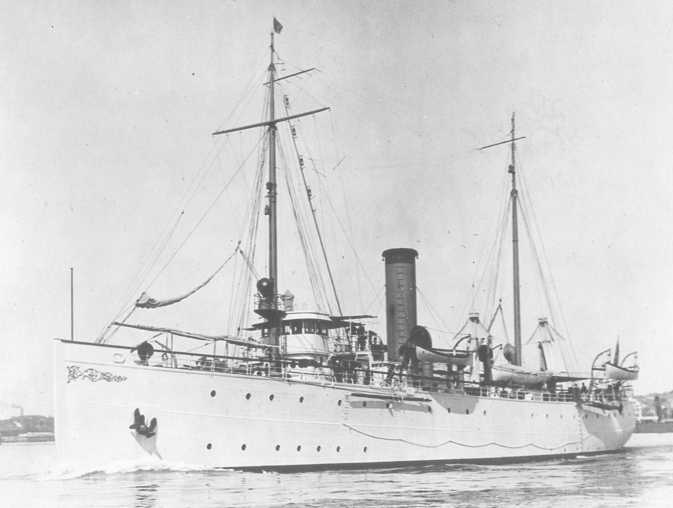
- USRC Androscoggin shortly after commissioning, 1908

History

United States
- Namesake: Androscoggin River, Maine, U.S.
- Operator: U.S. Revenue Cutter Service
- Builder: Rodermond Bros., Tomkins Cove, New York; Pusey & Jones, Wilmington, Delaware
- Cost: US$230,087 (Original contract price)
- Launched: 16 January 1907
- Commissioned: 8 July 1908
- Decommissioned: 26 August 1921
- Fate: Sold 10 May 1922 at Baltimore, Maryland

General characteristics
- Displacement: 1200 tons
- Length: 210 ft (64 m)
- Beam: 36 ft (11 m)
- Draft: 17 ft 6 in (5.33 m)
- Installed power: 1,800 SHP
- Propulsion: Triple-expansion steam engine, 20.75 in (52.7 cm), 32 in (81 cm), 50 in (130 cm) diameter x 27 in (69 cm) stroke
- Speed: 13.2 knots (max)
- Complement: 44
- Armament: 4 × 6-pounders (1908); 4 × 3-inch gun, 1 Y-gun for depth charges (1918)

== Design and construction ==
USRC Androscoggin was built by Rodermond Bros. Shipyard at Tomkins Cove, New York, and placed under sea trials on 3 March 1908 before being finished by Pusey and Jones Shipyard at Wilmington, Delaware. Additional work by Pusey and Jones put the final cost at US$249,600.97. She was the Revenue Cutter Service's first purposely built icebreaker and the last major revenue cutter with a wooden hull, having been constructed of white oak, larch and pine. At the time, wood was thought to be appropriate for ice work because of its elasticity. Androscoggin was fitted with an iron-strengthened bow so that she could push navigation obstructions out of the way and break ice. She had a flush weather deck that made it easier to do assistance work during rescue operations which was departure from the design of earlier classes of revenue cutters. Androscoggin was designed to have a 1,800 shaft horsepower triple expansion steam engine that powered a single screw which gave the cutter a top speed of 13.2 knots. The engine room included water-tube boilers fired with oil rather than coal, a departure from older Revenue Service cutters. The cutter was initially fitted with four 6-pounder naval guns.

== History ==
=== 1908–1911 ===
Androscoggin was placed in commission at the Revenue Cutter Service Depot, Curtis Bay, Baltimore, Maryland, on 8 July 1908 and on 22 July received sailing orders that permanently stationed her at Portland, Maine, with cruising grounds along the coast of Maine. On 10 March 1909, she was ordered to take station at Tompkinsville, Staten Island, New York, to temporarily relieve USRC Mohawk and received orders returning her to Portland on 13 April. During June 1909, she was assigned regatta patrol duty at New London, Connecticut. Androscoggin was detailed on 11 August to search for 6 missing sailors from U.S. Navy tug Nezinscot which had capsized off Cape Ann, Massachusetts. She spent the balance of the fall of 1909 assisting at various yacht races and community celebrations. In January 1910, She conducted a search for survivors of the steam lighter Colombia, which had left New York City bound for Port-au-Prince, Haiti with a crew of eleven. Androscoggin traveled 2,999 mi (4,826 km) in search of the lost ship but did not find a trace of the lost ship or her crew. During the summer of 1910 she was temporarily transferred to Washington, D.C. In November, she was directed to proceed to the Boston Navy Yard for repairs, which took until January 1911 to complete. Androscoggin returned to her cruising schedule off the Maine coast after leaving Boston. During the bulk of 1911 she cruised the coast from Maine to Boston and arrived at the Revenue Cutter Service Yard at Baltimore for repairs to the iron plate on the bow of the vessel in November 1911.

=== 1912–1914 ===
In January 1912, Androscoggin was directed by the collector of customs at Gloucester, Massachusetts, to go to the Grand Banks of Newfoundland and assist USRC Gresham with freeing thirty fishing vessels that were stuck in ice floes. The two revenue cutters managed to free twenty five of the fishing vessels from the ice and Androscoggin escorted them back to Gloucester. The rest of the year of 1912 saw more cruising of the Maine coast until November when she was sent to cover the cruising area of USRC Itasca. She was relieved by Itasca on 11 December and resumed her own cruising area. Androscoggin conducted searches for missing schooners Future and Winslow off the Virginia capes January 1913. During the rest of 1913 she spent much of the year patrolling at various shows, regattas, and public functions involving newly appointed Secretary of the Treasury William McAdoo. On 13 October Androscoggin sighted the burning derelict steamer Templemore which had been abandoned two days before by her crew. The cutter crew managed to install tow lines on the aft section of the steamer because the bow was still too hot. After an awkward tow through a gale and rough seas Androscoggin finally reached Boston. She received winter sailing orders on 13 November. Androscoggin arrived at the Revenue Cutter Service Yard on 13 December for repairs and left the yard on New Year's Day, 1914, only to run aground near Cove Point Light, Maryland, three days later. She was re-floated with the assistance of USRC Apache with apparently no damage and proceeded to Boston where a Board of Inquiry was convened on 10 January to investigate the cause of the grounding. On 11 February Androscoggin arrived at Halifax, Nova Scotia, to help free USS Potomac, a Navy tug which was stuck in ice while attempting to free ice bound vessels. The attempt to free Potomac was abandoned on 14 February and the tug remained on the ice until spring. From the spring of 1914 until August she conducted routine patrol work along with visits to various community ceremonies from Boston to Portland. On 5 August Androscoggin received orders proceed as quickly as possible to Bar Harbor, Maine, to assist North German Lloyd Line SS Kronprinzessin Cecilie with the unloading of a cargo of gold, silver and all passengers and to see that the steamship did not leave port. The July outbreak of World War I caused Germany and England to go to war with each other and the North German Lloyd Company chose internment with the United States because they did not want their ship captured by the British. With duties completed, she left for Baltimore and the Cutter Service Depot for hull repairs on 16 August.

=== 1915–1917 ===
On 26 December 1914, Androscoggin was assigned to provide medical assistance to the fishing trade off the coast of New England and Nova Scotia in accordance with an act of Congress passed in June 1914. She was outfitted as a hospital ship and staffed with United States Public Health Service personnel. The cutter's doctor helped more than a hundred sick or injured fishermen during the period of January to June, 1915 On 28 January 1915 the United States Revenue Cutter Service was merged by act of Congress with the United States Life-Saving Service to form the United States Coast Guard and the USRC Androscoggin was there after named USCGC Androscoggin. During the balance of 1915, and all of 1916 she patrolled the coast from Boston to Shelburne, Nova Scotia, with occasional stops at various regattas and community celebrations. On 6 April 1917 Androscoggin was temporarily transferred to the control of the Secretary of the Navy, by act of war passed by Congress.

=== World War I service ===
The United States Congress declared war on the German Empire on 6 April 1917 and with that act of war the Coast Guard was transferred to U.S. Navy control. (Note: The 28 January 1915 "Act to Create the Coast Guard" included language concerning the nature of the military service that the U.S. Coast Guard would perform. The act directed that the Coast Guard "shall constitute a part of the military forces of the United States and which shall operate under the Treasury Department in time of peace and operate as a part of the Navy, subject to orders of the Secretary of the Navy, in time of war or when the President shall so direct") (Note: During the time that the Coast Guard was under U.S. Navy control all cutters were prefixed with USS instead of USCGC.) Androscoggin received orders to report to the Boston Navy yard where a battery of 3-inch guns and a fire control system was installed. She then went to Provincetown, Massachusetts, where extensive repairs to the hull and engine room were made. She was assigned to the First Naval District and patrolled the waters off the coast of Maine along with rescue, towing and convoy duties. As threats from German submarines increased in the spring of 1918 along the eastern seaboard, Androscoggin was equipped with a Y-gun to launch depth charges and her patrol area was extended from Boston to St. John's, Newfoundland in search of submarines. Andrscoggin went to the aid of the disabled British steamship Turret Crown in the North Atlantic in March 1918, successfully towing her to Boston. Her coastal patrol work was interrupted by orders to convoy HMS Shearwater and several small British submarines from Sandwich, Massachusetts, to Halifax during October 1918. Six months later Androscoggin was again assigned escort duty from New London, Connecticut to Bermuda escorting several submarine chasers. The return to the mainland involved stopping at Guantanamo Bay, Cuba to take personnel aboard and a barge in tow destined for Norfolk, Virginia. She transported guns and ordnance from the Washington Navy Yard to New London before receiving the assignment at Quebec to escort three Canadian minesweepers when the Armistice of 11 November 1918 was signed.

=== 1919–1922 ===
With the signing of the armistice, Coast Guard cutters were released from war assignments and resumed regular assignments. Androscoggin was assigned to the International Ice Patrol effective 1 April 1919 and alternated patrol duties with USCGC Tallapoosa until 30 June. The duties included tracking ice floes along the North Atlantic shipping lanes and reporting their positions by radio. On 28 August 1919 the Coast Guard was transferred back to Treasury Department control, however Androscoggin along with cutters Ossipee, Acushnet, Mackinac, and Winnisimmet were not returned to Coast Guard control until 22 September 1919. She was returned to regular patrol duties from Eastport, Maine, to Nantucket, Massachusetts, with a homeport at Boston and temporary duties patrolling the International Yacht Races in New York. In October 1920 Androscoggin was tasked with investigating the cause of tampering with nets on fishing trawlers that were located off Cape Ann. The persons causing problems with the fishing nets were not caught and the problem seemed to have resolved itself with just the cutter's presence. Requiring repairs, she put into Boston Navy Yard and spent the rest of 1920 in the yard. On 1 January 1921, she left the Navy Yard and searched unsuccessfully for hazards to navigation reported by passing steamers in the vicinity of Boston. After the search, Androscoggin was assigned as a stand-in at Woods Hole, Massachusetts, while Acushnet was assigned off-station. Later she was assigned to the cruising area of Ossipee while she was off-station. After sailing south to Norfolk on 1 July to relieve Manning while she put in for repairs. During this time Androscoggin was directed to Chincoteague Island to search for schooners Bertha and Pocomo whose owners had allegedly been using them to smuggle whiskey in violation of the Volstead Act. The search proved unsuccessful and she returned to Norfolk on 12 July. On 3 August, Manning returned to her regular station, and Androscoggin received orders to report to the Washington Navy Yard for the start of decommissioning. Prior to decommissioning, she was assigned to a short cruise on the Potomac River with a congressional delegation, then the cutter was moved to the Coast Guard Depot at Curtis Bay, Baltimore, Maryland where the crew removed stores and equipment. The crew was assigned to the newly built Tampa. On 26 August 1921 Androscoggin was placed out of commission at the Coast Guard Depot. Androscoggin was sold at the depot to Charles A. Jording of Baltimore on 10 May 1922 for US$8,250. (Note: The amount paid for Androscoggin by Jording included the purchase price of decommissioned USCGC Itasca.)
