= William E. Reynolds =

Commandant of the United States Coast Guard (1860-1944)

William Edward Reynolds
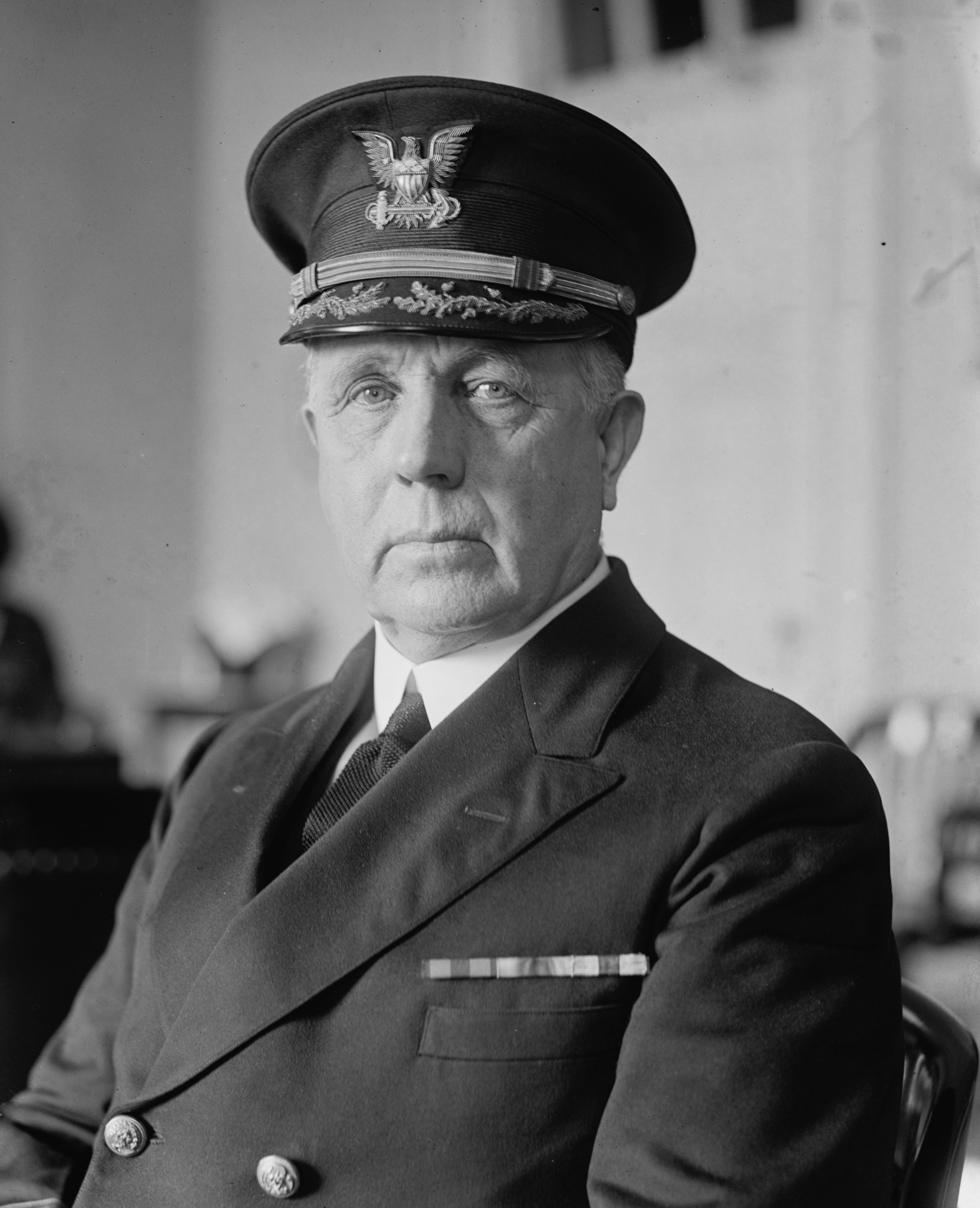
- Born: January 11, 1860; Montgomery County, Maryland, U.S.
- Died: January 25, 1944 (aged 84)
- Military career
- Branch: United States Coast Guard
- Service years: 1878–1924
- Rank: Rear admiral
- Commands: Commandant of the Coast Guard

William Edward Reynolds (11 January 1860 – 25 January 1944) served as the fifth Commandant of the United States Coast Guard, from 1919 to 1924.

During the early part of his military career, Reynolds spent much of his time aboard various vessels in the Revenue Cutter Service and its successor agency, the United States Coast Guard. He took an active interest in the education of officers as superintendent of the Revenue Cutter Service School of Instruction by increasing and modernizing the curriculum. The period after World War I when he served as Commandant was one of manpower shortages and personnel problems as well as questions about whether the Treasury Department or the Navy Department should control the Coast Guard. Reynolds was able to guide the service through the difficulties of control and actually increased the number of vessels and men serving under him.

== Early life and career ==
Reynolds was born in Montgomery County, Maryland. He was appointed at age eighteen as a cadet to the Revenue Cutter Service School of Instruction at Curtis Bay, Maryland, on 24 May 1878 and after two years of training was commissioned as a third lieutenant on 17 July 1880. He was in the second class graduated from the School of Instruction. As a member of the crew of USRC Corwin, in 1881, he participated in the search for the missing exploration steamer USS Jeannette along the northern coast of Siberia using a sled team. On 12 August 1881 he was a member of the expedition which claimed Wrangel Island for the United States while searching for Jeannette.

On 24 December 1884 Reynolds reported aboard the School of Instruction's training cutter, USRC Salmon P. Chase as one of the instructors at the school. On 1 June 1885 Reynolds was promoted to second lieutenant. He remained assigned to the Chase until 21 April 1888. On 15 April 1889, he returned to the Chase for a little more than one year, leaving on 19 May 1890. (Note: References used in this article do not indicate where Reynolds was assigned from April 1888 to April 1889. It was common practice through this period to send officers home "awaiting orders", although there is no evidence that this was the case. There are also no records for Reynolds assignments for the period from May 1890 to January 1896.) On 18 January 1896 Reynolds was promoted to first lieutenant. Coincidentally, on that same date, the court-martial of Captain Michael "Hell Roaring Mike" Healy for conduct unbecoming of an officer and hazarding the safety of his vessel, the USRC Bear, by being intoxicated; began in San Francisco, California, and Reynolds had been appointed as prosecuting officer. He was successful and Healy was convicted on all charges on 5 March 1896.

At the beginning of the Spanish–American War, Reynolds was serving as captain of the USRC Louis McLane in the North Atlantic Fleet under Navy Rear Admiral William T. Sampson. Based at Key West, Florida, McLane guarded the submarine telegraph cable that ran from Key West to Sanibel Island.

On 6 November 1902 Reynolds assumed the assignment of superintendent of the Revenue Cutter Service School of Instruction and the command of the training cutter USRC Chase. On 31 January 1903 Reynolds was promoted to captain. Under his leadership, the School of Instruction added a third year of training, adding to the curriculum more science and mathematics. At the direction of Congress the school provided for the appointment of cadet engineers for a six-month training program. Candidates were to have had at least six months practical experience in marine engineering and upon graduation they filled positions as second assistant engineers. To help with the training of engineers, Reynolds requested that the Chase be replaced with a more modern steam powered cutter. During Reynolds' tenure at the school, a new training cutter was acquired; USRC Itasca was the former USS Bancroft, a former U.S. Naval Academy training vessel. Reynolds commanded her on her initial training cruise to the Mediterranean during the summer of 1907. On 23 January 1909, as captain of USRC Seneca, he responded to the collision of White Star passenger liner SS Republic with the Italian liner SS Florida, 26 miles southeast of Nantucket, Massachusetts, assisting USRC Gresham with the rescue of passengers and crew of the Republic. On 9 July 1909 Reynolds was promoted to senior captain. (Note: Senior captain would have been equivalent to a Navy commander. A Revenue Cutter Service captain was equivalent in rank to a Navy lieutenant commander at that time.) As Captain Commandant Worth G. Ross indicated that he was going to retire in 1911 because of ill health, speculation as to who would succeed him as Captain Commandant became a campaign by several senior officers in the Revenue Cutter Service. Although he didn't actively seek the position, Reynolds name was mentioned a possibility by other senior captains, but eventually the campaign by Senior Captain Ellsworth P. Bertholf would succeed. (Note: References used in this article do not indicate where Reynolds was assigned when he left USRC Seneca until the beginning of World War I. It is known that he was commanding the Seneca on 23 January 1909 and the southern division of the Pacific coast on 6 April 1917. Existing records have no indication of his assignments for the intervening eight years.) (Note: President Woodrow Wilson signed Senate Bill 2337 on 28 January 1915 creating the United States Coast Guard through the merger of the United States Life-Saving Service with the United States Revenue Cutter Service. On that date the newly formed service had 25 sea-going cutters and 19 harbor tugs and launches and 270 stations. The bill authorized 4,093 officers, warrant officers, and enlisted men. The service also consisted of one headquarters at Washington, D.C., 17 regional commands, four depots and one academy.)

When the United States entered World War I on 6 April 1917, Senior Captain Reynolds was commanding the Coast Guard's southern division at San Francisco. He was directed to report to the Commander, Twelfth Naval District for assignment where he was put in charge of harbor patrols for the district but also retained his old assignment. On 11 September 1917, he was reassigned as the district chief of staff, in addition to his former assignments. He remained as district chief of staff for the remainder of the war.

== Commandant ==
As the most senior officer after the Captain Commandant of the Coast Guard, Reynolds had the strong recommendation of Bertholf to succeed him as Captain Commandant. Bertholf wanted to retire, but was hesitant to do so because the Navy wanted to retain the control over the Coast Guard that they had gained during the war. Secretary of the Navy Josephus Daniels actively sought control at committee hearings in Congress. Secretary of the Treasury Carter Glass finally met with President Woodrow Wilson who issued Executive Order 3160 on 28 August 1919 stating that "it is hereby directed that the Coast Guard shall on and after this date operate under the Treasury Department."

=== The Campbell bill ===
With a recommendation by Bertholf, Glass appointed Reynolds as Captain Commandant. Reynolds assumed command of the Coast Guard with the rank of commodore effective 2 October 1919. He replaced Bertholf who had retired from the service on 30 June.

As Commodore Commandant of the Coast Guard one of Reynolds first concerns was a renewed effort by the Navy to control the Coast Guard by congressional action and a bill was introduced by Pennsylvania Representative Guy Campbell to accomplish a transfer to the Navy. Many Coast Guard officers felt they had better pay and advancement opportunities if they were transferred to the Navy and they actively supported the legislation by drumming up support for it through shipping trade organizations. The legislation was ultimately defeated through the efforts of the recently retired Bertholf, who had many political connections and Glass, who had resigned his Treasury position to accept appointment as Senator from Virginia.

=== Personnel problems ===
Serious personnel problems developed during the first years of Reynolds' tenure as commandant. Most of the enlistments in the Coast Guard made during World War I were voluntary and most of the men wanted discharged from the service as soon as possible. Efforts to replace discharged personnel were not very successful even with the offer of one year enlistments and greatly increased recruiting activity. Because the enlisted Coast Guardsmen could only be held in service for three months after a formal peace treaty was signed with Germany, many of them felt they were being unfairly treated. When a peace treaty was signed, problems would be compounded by those left in the service because the pay schedules would revert to a law passed in 1908 that covered pay for the Coast Guard when not assigned to the Navy. Disciplinary problems increased during this period and were not completely solved by legislation enacted in May 1920 that equalized pay with Navy pay schedules.

A shortage of officers occurred post war despite a law requiring the Coast Guard to adopt the Navy's rank structure. The problem was that temporary wartime officer promotions were to be rescinded in 1921 leaving many to be reduced in rank. Reynolds attempted to reduce the shortage of officers by asking the Navy to allow some of their new graduates from the Naval Academy to transfer to the Coast Guard. The Navy claimed they needed all of the graduates for their manning problems, so no transfers were made. Because of the shortage of personnel, six cutters of the Atlantic fleet had to be decommissioned in order to man the cutters assigned to the Bering Sea Patrol.

=== Fleet modernization ===
Because of the requirements necessary to help the Navy during World War I, many of the cutters acquired during the 1890s were outdated and unable to perform the missions the Navy envisioned for them during time of war. In addition, the Coast Guard had lost three cutters to enemy action during the war. While construction was suspended on cutters designed before the war due to a lack of yard capacity, Reynolds did manage to fund the construction of four new truly "multi-mission" large cutters. The USCGC Tampa, USCGC Haida, USCGC Mojave, and USCGC Modoc were designed for use in law enforcement, ice patrol, search and rescue, derelict destruction and towing and used newly developed steam powered turbo-electric drives that were similar to the Navy's main drive engines used on battleships of the period, however they were more compact because of the limited engineering spaces on the smaller cutters. In addition to the large cutters, USCGC Shawnee, a 158 ft (48 m) ocean-going tug was added to the fleet.

=== Prohibition ===
With the passage of the Eighteenth Amendment to the United States Constitution and the enabling law known as the Volstead Act, the enforcement of national prohibition after 16 January 1920 fell to the Treasury Department's Bureau of Internal Revenue. Treasury Secretary David F. Houston created a Prohibition Unit within the bureau, but he did not include the Coast Guard in the unit's makeup. Because the Coast Guard was not a part of the Prohibition Unit and Congress did not appropriate funds for the Coast Guard to use in prohibition enforcement, Reynolds did little to stop liquor importation before 1922. He suggested that if the Prohibition Unit wanted to pay for the crews and costs of operation of nine Coast Guard-operated 110 ft (34 m) submarine chasers, that the Coast Guard would then be interested in more enforcement of the prohibition laws. Reynolds requested in his 1923 budget proposals an increase in personnel manning levels of 3,535 officers and men and the acquisition of twenty new cutters, 200 cabin cruisers, and 91 motorboats Congress thought the request was excessive, but did fund twenty destroyers and two minesweepers as well as 223 cabin cruisers, and 100 smaller motorboats with an additional 4,356 officers and men to operate the vessels. The destroyers and minesweepers were surplus World War I Navy vessels and Congress felt that the older vessels could be overhauled cheaper than new cutters. In addition, some of the officers to command the vessels were given temporary promotions, but without an increase in pay and allowances.

=== Promotion ===
On 12 January 1923, by act of Congress, Reynolds became the first Coast Guard officer to hold the rank of Rear Admiral. He retired as Commandant of the Coast Guard on 11 January 1924, and was succeeded by Rear Admiral Frederick C. Billard, his former aide.

== Retirement and death ==
The same law that promoted Reynolds to rear admiral in 1923 also allowed Coast Guard officers to retire with the rank and retired pay of the next higher grade if they had more than 40 years of service. Reynolds initially did not receive this tombstone promotion since the commandant already held the highest pay grade in the Coast Guard, which was equivalent to a Navy rear admiral (lower half) when Reynolds retired on January 11, 1924, upon reaching the statutory age limit of 64. The pay of the commandant was raised to that of a Navy rear admiral (upper half) in 1930, and when a 1936 law provided the retired pay of that grade for every former commandant except Reynolds, he petitioned for his tombstone promotion, which the Court of Claims eventually granted in December 1941, along with additional retired pay for the six years prior to his petition.

Reynolds died 25 January 1944.

== See also ==
- Discussion of Navy control of the Coast Guard after World War I.
- Rum Patrol

== Notes ==
Footnotes

Citations

References cited

- "B-3616, AUGUST 28, 1939, 19 COMP. GEN. 293". Legal Decisions & Bid Protests. U.S. Government Accountability Office.
- "Record of Movements: Vessels of the United States Coast Guard, 1790 – December 31, 1933" (PDF). U.S. Coast Guard Cutters & Craft Index. U.S. Coast Guard Historian's Office. 1989.
- "William E. Reynolds". Commandants of the U.S. Coast Guard. U.S. Coast Guard Historian's Office.
- Johnson, Robert Irwin (1987). Guardians of the Sea, History of the United States Coast Guard, 1915 to the Present. Naval Institute Press, Annapolis, Maryland. ISBN 978-0-87021-720-3.
- King, Irving H. (1996). The Coast Guard Expands, 1865–1915: New Roles, New Frontiers. Naval Institute Press, Annapolis, Maryland. ISBN 978-1-55750-458-6.
- Kroll, C. Douglas (2002). Commodore Ellsworth P. Bertholf: First Commandant of the Coast Guard. Naval Institute Press, Annapolis, Maryland. ISBN 978-1-55750-474-6.
- Larzelere, Alex (2003). The Coast Guard in World War I: An Untold Story. Naval Institute Press, Annapolis, Maryland. ISBN 978-1-55750-476-0.
- Noble (1990), Dennis L. "Historical Register U.S. Revenue Cutter Service Officers, 1790–1914" (PDF). Coast Guard Personnel. U.S. Coast Guard Historian's Office.
- Strobridge, Truman R. and Dennis L. Noble (1999). Alaska and the U.S. Revenue Cutter Service, 1867–1915. Naval Institute Press, Annapolis, Maryland. ISBN 978-1-55750-845-4.

Military offices
Preceded by Ellsworth P. Bertholf	Commandant of the Coast Guard; 1919–1924	Succeeded by Frederick C. Billard
