= USCGC Itasca =

USCGC Itasca may refer to one of the following United States Coast Guard Cutters:

- USCGC Itasca (1907)
- USCGC Itasca (1929)
