= Edward H. Smith (sailor) =

American Coast Guard admiral

Edward Hanson Smith
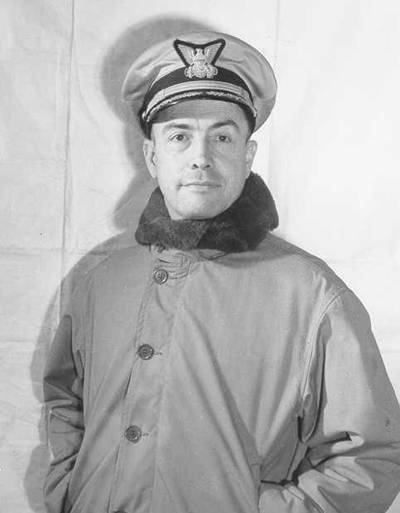
- Edward H. Smith in 1942
- Born: 29 October 1889; Vineyard Haven, Massachusetts
- Died: 29 October 1961 (aged 72); Quissett, Massachusetts, U.S.
- Burial place: Martha's Vineyard, Massachusetts, U.S.
- Military career
- Allegiance: United States of America
- Branch: United States Navy
- Service years: 1910–1950
- Rank: Rear admiral
- Nickname: "Iceberg" Smith
- Awards: Navy Distinguished Service Medal
- Other work: Director of Woods Hole Oceanographic Institution, 1950–1956

Edward Hanson "Iceberg" Smith (29 October 1889 – 29 October 1961) was a United States Coast Guard admiral, oceanographer, and Arctic explorer. He was born 29 October 1889 at Vineyard Haven, Massachusetts. He received a Ph.D. in oceanography from Harvard, and commanded the USCGC Marion and the USCGC Northland. Most famously, he commanded the Greenland Patrol, and led Coast Guard efforts to defend Greenland against the Germans in World War II. After retirement from the Coast Guard, he assumed the directorship of Woods Hole Oceanographic Institution.

== Early life and career ==
Smith attended high schools at Vineyard Haven and New Bedford, Massachusetts. After attending one year at Massachusetts Institute of Technology, Smith was appointed a cadet at the Revenue Cutter Service School of Instruction on 8 May 1910 and after graduation was commissioned as a third lieutenant 7 June 1913. One of his classmates was Coast Guard aviation pioneer Elmer F. Stone. Smith's first assignment was aboard USRC Seminole home-ported at Wilmington, North Carolina where he served as the cutter junior engineering officer. In February 1915 he was transferred to USCGC Acushnet and USCGC Apache before be returning to USCGC Seminole. (Note: After 28 January 1915 the Revenue Cutter Service was merged with the United States Life-Saving Service to form the United States Coast Guard. The prefix for Revenue Cutter Service vessels was changed from USRC to USCGC, thus; USRC Seminole became USCGC Seminole.) He remained assigned there until 4 August 1917 when he was transferred to USCGC Manning which escorted troop and supply convoys to Europe during World War I. During his tour of duty aboard Manning, Smith was promoted to second lieutenant on 7 June 1918. After short tours aboard USCGC Tallapoosa and USS Antigone from January to November 1919, Smith was assigned to USCGC Seneca, which was one of two cutters assigned annually to the International Ice Patrol.

== International Ice Patrol ==
Because the Coast Guard had been tasked with staffing the International Ice Patrol as a result of the sinking of the RMS Titanic in 1912, the service had always looked for ways to predict the path of icebergs that entered North Atlantic shipping lanes. President Woodrow Wilson issued an executive order on 7 February 1914 requiring the Coast Guard to assign two vessels to derelict destruction and patrol work in the North Atlantic for the remainder of the year, except that "the study and observation of ice conditions shall be effectively maintained, in particular from the beginning of February to the opening of the ice season." Although patrol activities had been suspended during World War I, the resumption of patrol work in 1919 included the Coast Guard hydrographer for the first time so that the Interdepartmental Board on International Service of Ice Observation, Ice Patrol and Ocean Derelict Destruction established by Wilson in 1916 could prepare a systematic program of scientific observations and publish the findings.

Smith was promoted to first lieutenant on 12 January 1923. He became interested in the scientific study of oceanography and the movement of icebergs during his assignment aboard Seneca, and remained assigned as an Ice Patrol hydrographer until August 1924 when he was directed by Coast Guard Headquarters to work with Vilhelm Bjerknes at the Bergen School of Meteorology. Bjerknes was internationally known for his studies of how wind currents interact with ocean currents to produce weather patterns and Smith studied his methods of measuring ocean currents. In August 1925, Smith spent three months at the British Meteorological Institute collecting data for use with the Ice Patrol before returning the United States and Ice Patrol duties. He received permission to study at Harvard University when Seneca wasn't on Ice Patrol duties. In 1925, Smith published A Practical Means for Determining Ocean Currents, which was utilized as a work bulletin throughout the Coast Guard.

== Marion expedition ==
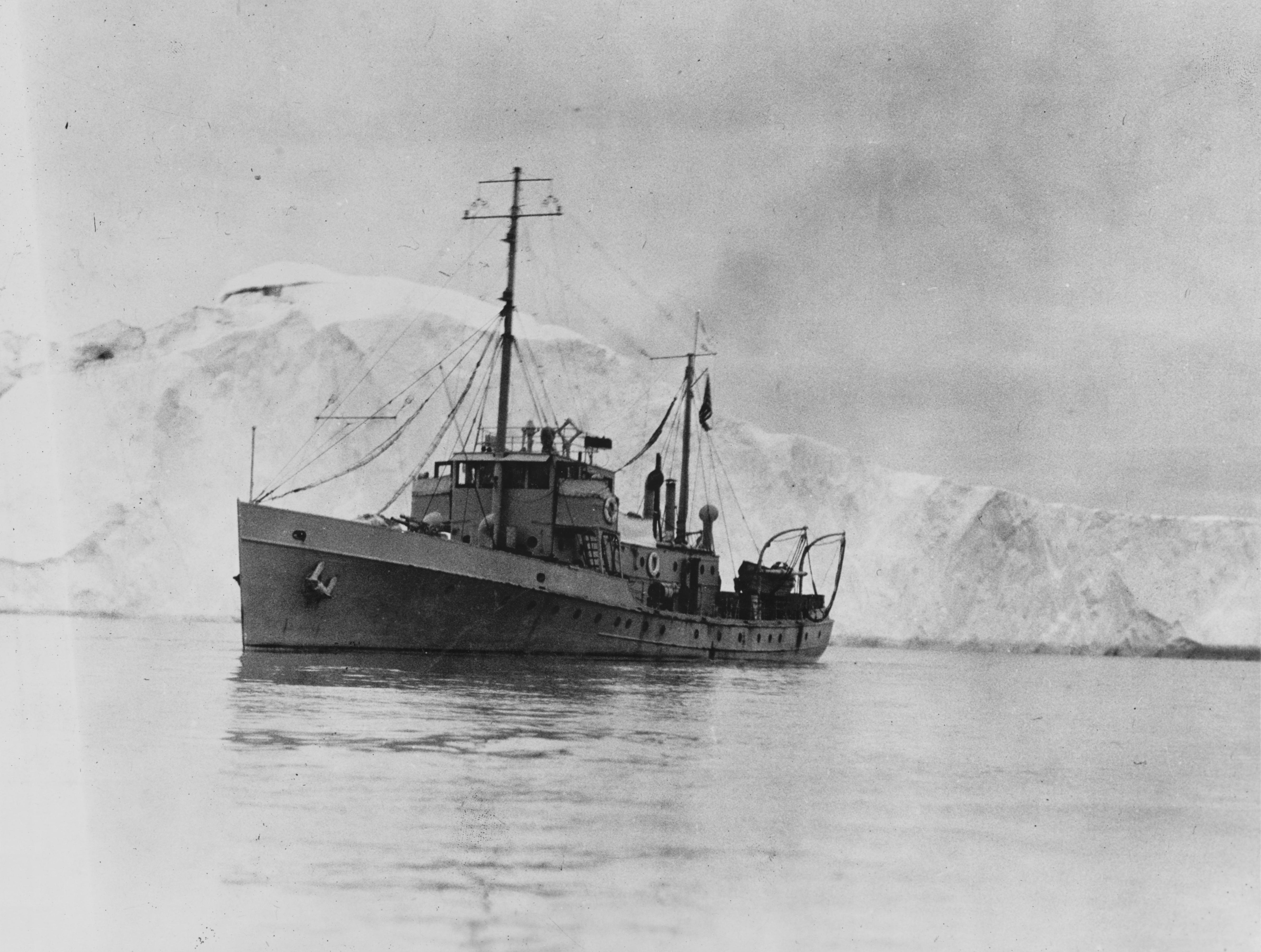
USCGC Marion in Baffin Bay (August 1928)

In early 1928, Frederick C. Billard, Commandant of the Coast Guard, directed that Smith outfit USCGC Marion for an oceanographic expedition of the Davis Strait to study the formation of icebergs and study their movement as well as take scientific readings of the sea water and depth soundings. Marion left Boston, Massachusetts on 11 July with Smith as commanding officer of a crew of 26 bound for the Strait of Belle Isle off the Labrador coast. At intervals, Smith oversaw the taking of temperature and salinity readings at various depths as well as bottom sample and depth soundings at each observation station. Upon the expedition's completion on 18 September, some 2,000 observations of temperature and salinity had been taken along with numerous bottom samples together with soundings. The soundings were added to existing charts and added to the general knowledge of the 450,000 square miles of the Davis Strait that the expedition encompassed.

== Pre-World War II career ==
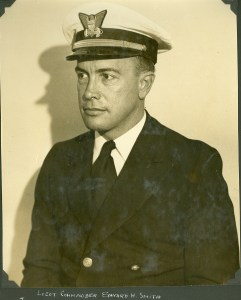
Smith in 1931

After his successful completion of the Marion expedition, Smith was reassigned to Rum Patrol duties as commanding officer of several cutters including the Coast Guard destroyers Henley, Downes, Shaw, Tucker and George E. Badger from 1928 to 1936. He was promoted to lieutenant commander on 21 April 1929. During times when the cutters he was assigned had maintenance availabilities at dockside, Smith worked on his doctoral thesis at Harvard University and was awarded a doctor of philosophy degree in geologic and oceanographic physics on 19 June 1930 using his Marion expedition research as a basis of his dissertation. Smith was recommended by Harvard University, the American Geographic Society and the National Academy of Sciences to go on an expedition aboard the German dirigible Graf Zeppelin in 1931. The original plan was to fly from Spitzbergen to Fairbanks, Alaska and return passing over the North Pole; however, the plans changed and a shorter flight was made from Leningrad over the Kara Sea during the week of 24 July to 1 August 1931.

Smith was promoted to the rank of commander 1 October 1934. In June 1936 he was assigned as commanding officer of USCGC Tahoe but was transferred in February 1937 to the newly commissioned USCGC Spencer as her first commanding officer. While Smith was assigned to Spencer he was cited by the Department of the Navy for his role in the rescue of the crew of USS Swallow after she ran aground at Kanaga Island on 19 February 1938. In October 1938 he was transferred to Boston and was designated as Commander, International Ice Patrol and also assumed command of USCGC Chelan. He commanded the Ice Patrol for the 1939 and 1940 seasons.

== Greenland Patrol and World War II ==
In June 1940, Smith was assigned as commanding officer of USCGC Northland while assuming duties as commander of the Greenland Patrol, which was responsible for Ice Patrol duties as well as assisting the Army and the Navy with establishing bases for the military defense of Greenland. Although the Commandant of the Coast Guard, Admiral Russell R. Waesche, wanted to discontinue the Ice Patrol activities for the 1941 season, it was suggested by President Franklin D. Roosevelt that the Ice Patrol might be a good cover for investigating reports that the German Navy might be attempting to establish weather stations along Greenland's eastern coast. As part of an agreement with the government of Denmark, Smith organized the Danish and Eskimo manned Northeast Greenland Sledge Patrol to patrol the eastern shores of Greenland in an effort to detect German weather stations. Smith was named as Commander, Northeast Greenland Patrol which consisted of USCGC Bear and USCGC North Star as well as Northland. In early September 1941, the Sledge Patrol reported the position of a vessel that had landed men in Greenland. Northland made contact with the Norwegian sealer Buskoe and put a prize crew aboard. A shore party from Northland located an unauthorized radio station manned by a shore party of four from Buskoe. Buskoe was towed to Boston by Bear and the crew of Buskoe were charged as illegal immigrants and not as prisoners of war because the United States was not at war at the time.

After the Buskoe incident, the Northeast and South Greenland Patrols were combined under Smith's command as the Greenland Patrol in October 1941. Smith was promoted to the rank of captain 1 December 1941. After the United States declared war on Germany in December 1941, Smith requested additional cutters to support the patrol in its increased mission load. In addition to watching the eastern coast of Greenland, the Greenland Patrol was tasked with escort duties and search and rescue work as well as helping establish LORAN radio navigation stations and installing aids to navigation so that supply ships could safely enter harbors near newly established airfields. Smith was promoted to the rank of rear admiral 30 June 1942 and on 21 November 1943 became Commander, Navy Task Force 24 which included the Greenland Patrol. Smith was awarded the Navy Distinguished Service Medal for his leadership of the Greenland Patrol and Task Force 24 by Secretary of the Navy James Forrestal. He was also made a Commander First Class of the Order of the Dannebrog by the King of Denmark.

== Post-war Coast Guard assignments ==
With the end of World War II, Smith was reassigned to be Commander, Third Coast Guard District based at New York City in August 1945 with additional duties as Commander, Eastern Area being assigned after May 1946. As a collateral duty he was also Captain of the Port of New York during this assignment and also oversaw all Captain of the Port activities within the Third District. From 1946 to 1949 Smith also served on the staff of the Applied Physics Laboratory of Johns Hopkins University. On 1 January 1948, his wartime promotion to rear admiral was made permanent. Beginning in 1949 he served as a project leader for the Weapons System Evaluation Group at the Department of Defense and worked in that capacity until his retirement on 30 June 1950.

== Woods Hole Oceanographic Institution ==
Through his former Harvard master's degree advisor, Dr. Henry Bryant Bigelow, then scientific advisor to the International Ice Patrol, Smith become elected to the board of trustees of the Woods Hole Oceanographic Institution in 1945; a post he served in until 1961 when he became an honorary trustee. On 1 July 1950, Smith was named director of the institution and served in that capacity until 1956. After he retired as director he remained on the staff of the institution until his death. During his tenure as director, he was responsible for the construction of the Laboratory of Oceanography building at the institute as well as the acquisition of Research Vessel Crawford, which was the former Coast Guard Cutter Crawford.

== Personal history ==
Smith was a member of the American Geophysical Union, the Arctic Institute of North America, the Aero-Arctic Society, and the Propeller Club of New York. He held an unlimited Merchant Marine master mariner license. He was married to Isabel R. (Brier) Smith and was the father to three sons, Porter, Stuart, and Jeremiah. Upon his death he was cremated and is buried at Martha's Vineyard, Massachusetts.

== Notes ==
=== References cited ===
- "Edward H. Smith Biography" (PDF). Retired U.S. Coast Guard Flag Officers. U.S. Coast Guard Historian's Office.
- "Edward Hanson Smith". Annual Report, 1961. Woods Hole Oceanographic Institution.
- Register of the Officers, Vessels, and Stations of the United States Coast Guard, January 1, 1918. Government Printing Office. 1918.
- "Swallow (AM-4)". Dictionary of American Naval Fighting Ships. Naval History & Heritage Command, U.S. Navy.
- "U.S. Coast Guard General Order No.1" (PDF). Historic Documents & Publications. U.S. Coast Guard Historian's Office.
- Johnson, Robert Irwin (1987). Guardians of the Sea, History of the United States Coast Guard, 1915 to the Present. Naval Institute Press, Annapolis, Maryland. ISBN 978-0-87021-720-3.
- Noble (1990), Dennis L. "Historical Register U.S. Revenue Cutter Service Officers, 1790–1914" (PDF). Coast Guard Personnel. U.S. Coast Guard Historian's Office.
- Tilley, John A. "The Coast Guard & the Greenland Patrol" (PDF). The Coast Guard in World War II. U.S. Coast Guard Historian's Office.
