= Tallapoosa-class cutter =

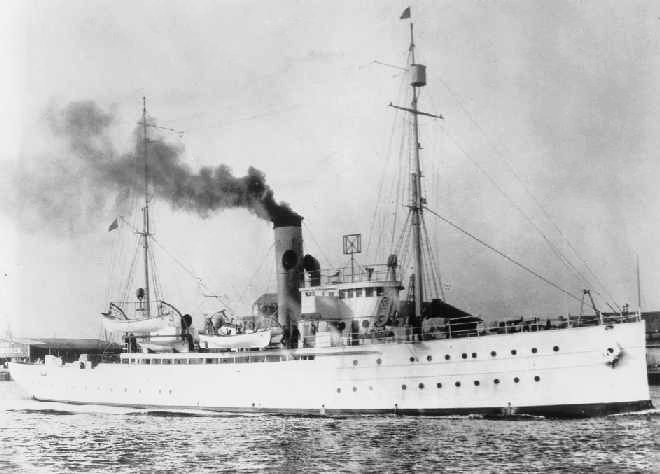
- USCGC Tallapoosa (WPG-52), 1920

Class overview
- Builders: Newport News Shipbuilding
- Operators: United States Coast Guard
- In service: 1946
- In commission: 1915–1946
- Completed: 2
- Retired: 2

General characteristics
- Displacement: 912-964 tons
- Length: 165 ft 10 in
- Beam: 32 ft
- Draft: 11 ft 9 in
- Propulsion: Variable
- Speed: 12 knots
- Complement: 9 officers, 63-65 enlisted
- Armament: 4 × 6-pounders (1915); 2 × 6-pdrs; 2 × 3" 50-cal (single-mounts) (as of 1930); 2 × 3"/50 (single-mounts); 1 × 3"/23; 2 × depth charge tracks (as of 1941); 2 × 3"/50 (single-mounts); 2 × 20mm/80 (single-mounts); 2 × Mousetraps; 4 × K-guns; 2 × depth charge tracks (as of 1945).

The Tallapoosa-class cutters is a group of two Coast Guard cutters that served with the United States Coast Guard from the 1920s to the late 1940s.

== Design ==
The Tallapoosa-class cutters were designed for long cruises, and their hulls were reinforced for light ice-breaking.

During World War II, the Ossipee was actually classified as a river gunboat (WPR) while the Tallapoosa was classified as a patrol gunboat (WPG).

== Ships in class ==
- Ossipee
- Tallapoosa
