= Frederick C. Billard =

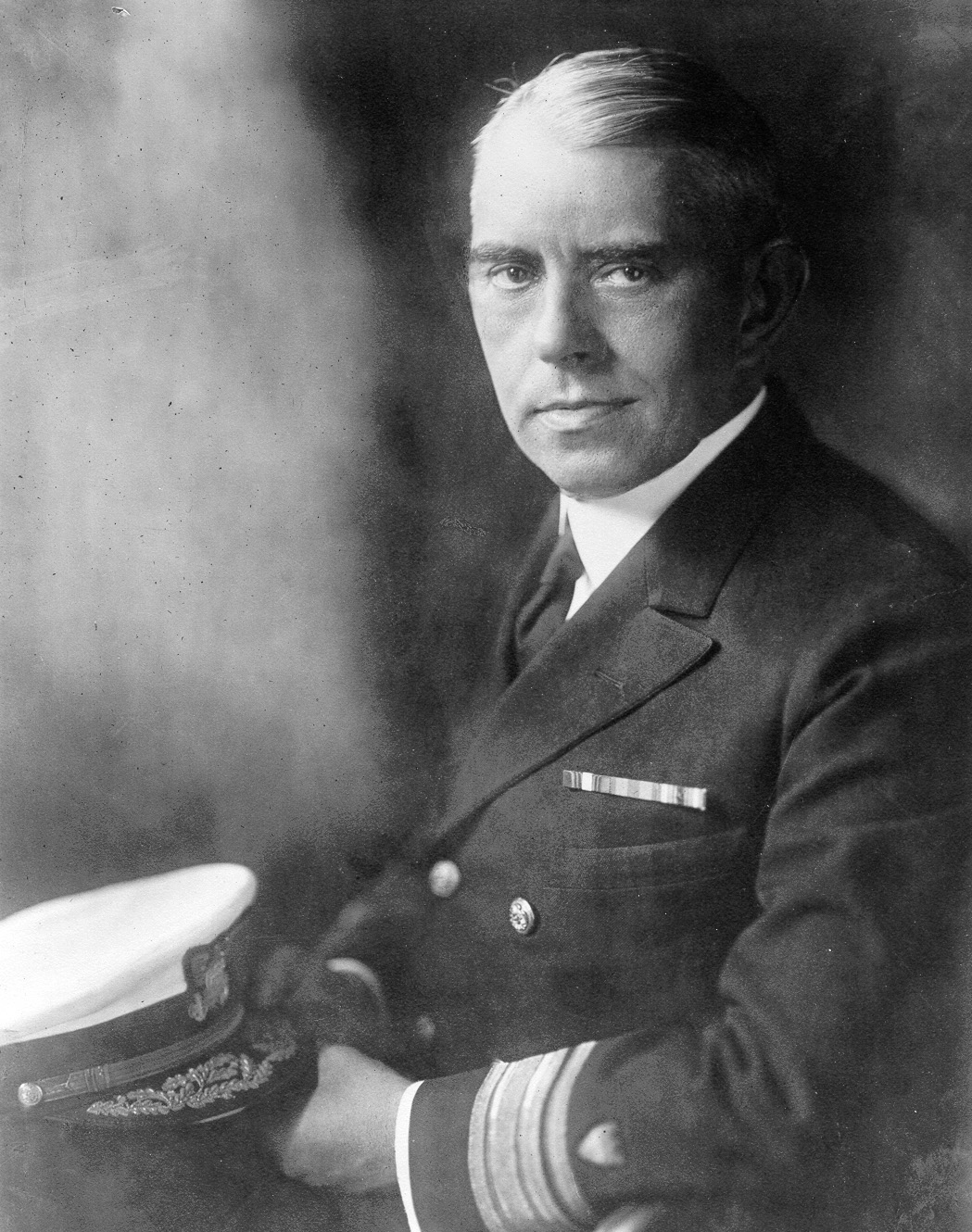
- Born: Frederick Chamberlayne Billard; 22 September 1873; Washington, D.C., U.S.
- Died: 17 May 1932 (aged 58)
- Buried: Arlington National Cemetery, Arlington County, Virginia, U.S.
- Branch: United States Coast Guard
- Service years: 1894–1932
- Rank: Rear admiral
- Commands: Commandant of the Coast Guard
- Conflicts: World War I
- Awards: Navy Cross

Frederick Chamberlayne Billard (22 September 1873 – 17 May 1932) served as the sixth commandant of the United States Coast Guard for an unprecedented three terms from 1924 until his death in 1932. Rear Admiral Billard died of pneumonia in May 1932 shortly after starting his third term. There were major changes to the organization during his career. The U.S. Revenue-Marine that was established on 4 August 1790 became the Revenue Cutter Service in 1894, the same year he enlisted. The Revenue Cutter Service that he had entered in 1894 merged with the United States Life-Saving Service to form the United States Coast Guard on 28 January 1915.

Billard's career began with his appointment to the School of Instruction of the Revenue Cutter Service in 1894. He served as an aide to two commandants, was the superintendent of the United States Coast Guard Academy twice, and commanded several cutters. He was promoted to the rank of rear admiral when he was appointed to the position of Coast Guard Commandant in January 1924.

His leadership of the Coast Guard during the Prohibition era required careful planning and use of available resources to accomplish the mission while making sure that other required missions were not slighted.

He was very involved in the training of his officers as a superintendent of the United States Coast Guard Academy, and he was responsible for the purchase of the permanent location of the academy at New London, Connecticut.

While he was commandant, he emphasized training, formalized coursework for enlisted personnel, and standardized the testing procedures for advancement in rating. Billard supported newly available technology such as aircraft and radio communication to accomplish the mission. The Coast Guard's involvement in oceanography was instituted during his tenure. He emphasized integrity in the Coast Guard's dealings with the public, and expected his officers and enlisted men to be honest in order to preserve the image of the Coast Guard.

Composed by U.S. Coast Guard Captain Francis Saltus Van Boskerck in 1927, Semper Paratus became the official song of the U.S. Coast Guard in 1928. During the run of A Girl in Every Port (1928 film) at the Fox Theater in Washington D.C., a detachment of 50 Coast Guard officers appeared at the theater for the debut of "Semper Paratus", the official song of the U.S. Coast Guard. The officers appeared at each performance during the playing of the song.

== Early life and education ==
Billard was born in Washington, D.C., on 22 September 1873. A graduate of the college prep (high) school, Baltimore City College, on 11 January 1894, he was appointed a cadet from Maryland in the United States Revenue Cutter Service. Cadets of the School of Instruction of that era trained aboard the barque, USRC Salmon P. Chase. The Chase had been newly modified to accommodate the first class of cadets trained after the school had closed temporarily in 1890. Billard was one of twelve cadets in the class during the summer of 1894 to train aboard Chase. He graduated from the School of Instruction 27 April 1896, and was commissioned a third lieutenant.

== Career ==
Billard was promoted to the temporary rank of second lieutenant on 11 August 1897; this was made permanent 14 January 1898. (Note: It is not evident in sources used in this article where Billard was stationed from the time he was commissioned until he reported for duty aboard the Corwin) In 1898, he reported for duty aboard USRC Corwin which was a part of the Bering Sea Patrol. After the Corwin was sold on 14 February 1900, he returned to the Chase as an instructor and navigator. Billard was promoted on 21 October 1904 to temporary first lieutenant; the promotion became permanent on 29 December 1904. In 1906, the Chief of the Revenue Cutter Service, Captain Worth G. Ross appointed Billard as his aide. He remained in this position until Ross's retirement in 1911. (Note: It is not evident from sources used in this article what Billard's assignments were from 1911 to 1914) On 1 June 1914, he became the Superintendent of the United States Revenue Cutter Academy and the commanding officer of the cadet training cutter, USRC Itasca. One year later, the name was changed to the United States Coast Guard Academy, when the United States Life-Saving Service was merged with the Revenue Cutter Service to form the U.S. Coast Guard.

World War I

In 1918, Billard was assigned to USS Aphrodite as her commanding officer. During his tour as commanding officer, Aphrodite operated in the European war zone and was the first American warship to transit the Kiel Canal after the World War I armistice was signed. In recognition of his services as commanding officer of Aphrodite, Billard was awarded the Navy Cross.

From 1919 to 1921, he served as aide to Commandant William E. Reynolds. Billard was the Superintendent of the United States Coast Guard Academy at Fort Trumbull near New London, Connecticut. from 1921 until his appointment as Commandant.

=== Commandant ===
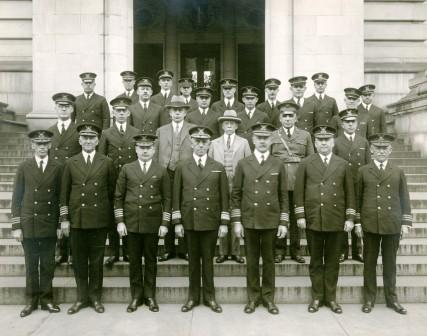
Commandant and administrative staff, U.S. Coast Guard Headquarters, Washington, D.C., 27 October 1928. Commandant Billard is centered in front row.

On 11 January 1924, Billard was promoted to the rank of rear admiral, and succeeded Rear Admiral William E. Reynolds as Commandant.

==== Prohibition ====
As a result of the passage of the Eighteenth Amendment to the United States Constitution, the Volstead Act, which went into effect 16 January 1920, placed the responsibility for enforcement of prohibition of the manufacture, sale, import, or export of intoxicating beverages under the jurisdiction of the Department of the Treasury. Secretary of the Treasury David F. Houston created a Prohibition Unit within the Bureau of Internal Revenue to deal with violation of the act, but his directive did not include the Coast Guard in the new unit. As a result, the Coast Guard did not initially enforce the act even though many liquor-laden vessels congregated on "Rum Row" just outside the three-mile limit near major cities on Atlantic and Gulf coasts. Since the Coast Guard was not specifically tasked with enforcement and funds were limited, few seizures of prohibited cargo occurred unless the seizure was incidental to other law enforcement duties. The first important enforcement did not occur until September 1921, with the seizure of the British registered schooner Henry L. Marshall by the cutter USCGC Seneca.

In 1923, Secretary of the Treasury Andrew Mellon recommended in a budget request that the Coast Guard obtain twenty new cutters, 200 cabin cruisers and 91 motorboats with an additional 3,535 officers and men at a cost of $28,500,000 for the enforcement of prohibition. At the time the total annual budget for the Coast Guard was less than ten million dollars and Congress did not agree with the request. On 2 April 1924, a bill was signed into law that provided the Coast Guard a little over twelve million dollars to fund the renovation of twenty Navy destroyers and two minesweepers for prohibition enforcement as well as 223 cabin cruisers and 100 smaller motor boats. The law also provided for the addition of 149 commissioned officers, 418 warrant officers and 3,789 enlisted men but some of the officers provided under the law were only given temporary promotions and no increase in pay. As the Coast Guard prepared for changes in operations caused by the new law, Billard addressed the commissioned officers of the service in a printed circular:

We can not, however, carry out this big undertaking to our full satisfaction unless I can count on the loyal and earnest support of each of you. So many conditions are bound to arise to try your devotion to a successful outcome in this matter and to test your interest and indeed your loyalty. Very many officers will have to be moved, maybe frequently, and often to stations or kinds of duty that may not be agreeable to them. Tours of shore duty may have to be curtailed or eliminated. Leaves of absence may have to be restricted or deferred. In short, conditions will be far from normal and may entail unusual discomforts and inconveniences. Furthermore, some mistakes are bound to be made, and Headquarters will probably do things that some of you think ill-advised, and experience may prove you right about them. Through it all, will you not bear in mind the big issues involved–the unsullied reputation of the Service for efficiency and devotion to duty.

Recruiting manpower for the enlarged "Rum Patrol" operation was simplified somewhat by high unemployment in some sections of the United States at the time. Training of new enlisted personnel was arranged by Billard through the Navy at Newport, Rhode Island and Hampton Roads, Virginia. Temporary commissions were offered to engineering college graduates and the class of 1925 of the Coast Guard Academy was graduated several months early to help fill much of the officer requirement.

The twenty destroyers that the Navy was to transfer under the 1924 budget legislation included some of the Navy's oldest destroyers, which had been built between 1910 and 1916 and seen service in World War I. They had been stored at the Philadelphia Navy Yard since the end of the war without extensive preservation and were not ready for immediate service. Boilers, turbines, condensers and auxiliary machinery had to be inspected and reconditioned where necessary. The 3-inch gun batteries, torpedo tubes and depth charge racks were deemed unnecessary for the prohibition mission and were removed and a one pounder was mounted forward to fire a warning shot at boats that might attempt to flee a boarding. Much of the reconditioning work was done by newly graduated recruits and the work went slow; the first destroyer out of the yard was not ready until late summer and the last was not commissioned until 1925.

In addition to the small craft that had been authorized, the service supplemented their small boat requirements with seized craft that were often faster than the original complement. These faster boats were often used by smugglers to ferry contraband liquor from "Rum Row" to the shore and often could outrun the service's vessels.

One of Billard's concerns during the prohibition period was that the number of court cases would cause the service harm by taking personnel off patrol duties to testify in court cases, as well as the negative publicity that could occur if it was necessary to fire on a vessel to enforce the law. He was assisted somewhat by various treaties made with foreign countries allowing a twelve-mile limit for search of contraband aboard foreign vessels.

As Commandant during the Prohibition Era, Billard established the Coast Guard's first intelligence center, designed to collect, evaluate, and disseminate information relating to smuggling practices and plans. The use of radio codes increased by both the service and the smugglers so the Coast Guard had to develop cryptanalysis skills to keep ahead of the smugglers. Radio direction finding equipment was installed on several Coast Guard vessels in late 1930. The original twenty destroyers were ending their expected service lives by 1930 and were replaced by newer craft that had been requested in 1926. Billard first used borrowed Navy aircraft in 1925 to track smugglers; this proved successful and in his 1926 budget requests he included the need for five aircraft at a cost of $152,000. With each improvement in detection and method of interdiction that the Coast Guard introduced, the smugglers would always find a different method of introducing contraband into the United States. Billard was concerned that Coast Guardsmen would succumb to enticements offered by the rum runners through either offers of liquor or cash, and there were several instances of this happening. Some service personnel were convicted at courts-martial of accepting bribes or improperly assisting liquor smugglers.

==== Education and morale ====
During his tours of duty as Superintendent of the Coast Guard Academy, Billard maintained an interest in the training of the officers that served under him. In 1926, the distinction between line and engineer cadets was abolished and all coursework was thereafter the same for every cadet. He repeated his budget requests each year funds for permanent facilities for the academy so that the inadequate Fort Trumbull quarters could be abandoned. In 1929, Congress finally granted his request of funds to establish a permanent academy and the city of New London donated to the U.S. government a tract of land adjacent to the Thames River for that purpose. In 1930, the course of instruction was increased to four years and the engineering curriculum was revised to include up-to-date methods and content. The cornerstone for Hamilton Hall, the first building, was laid on 15 May 1931 and the new academy was first occupied by cadets returning from the summer training cruise in September 1932.

Billard was not only concerned about officer education, as enlisted morale and education were first funded under his direction. Funds were provided for recreational equipment, radios, phonographs, film projectors and athletic equipment for duty stations and cutters serving in remote areas. In addition, libraries were established at most units through private donations and the American Merchant Marine Library Association. Correspondence courses were made available through the Navy's Bureau of Navigation and the Marine Corps Institute. Patterned after the Marine Corps Institute, the U.S. Coast Guard Institute was started at the academy in 1928. It distributed correspondence coursework and graded examinations to qualify enlisted Coast Guardsmen for advancement in rating and provided a degree of uniformity in the promotion process that had been lacking in previous years.

==== New cutters ====
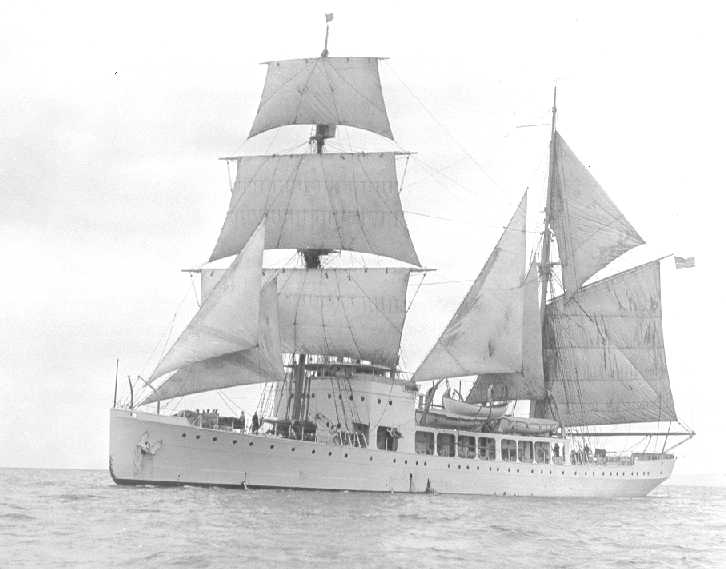
USCGC Northland, circa 1929

During Commandant Billard's tenure, the Coast Guard sought a replacement cutter for the aging USCGC Bear which had been built in 1874 and was used for Arctic service. After consultation with 47 Coast Guard officers that had years of experience in Arctic waters, the Coast Guard named Newport News Shipbuilding of Newport News, Virginia to build the replacement vessel. The result was a steel-hulled cutter that was specifically designed for icebreaking and had a brigantine sail rig for emergency use in the event of ice damage to her propellers. USCGC Northland was the last cruising cutter built with a sail rig and was commissioned 7 May 1927. Billard made it clear to Secretary Mellon in his budget requests that the addition of vessels used for prohibition enforcement did not satisfy the needs of the service for cruising cutters because the larger cruising cutters that were presently in service were fast approaching obsolescence and the smaller prohibition enforcement vessels served a different purpose. Accordingly, at Mellon's insistence, Congress authorized the construction of ten cutters in June 1926. The first five 250 ft (76 m) Lake-class cutters were commissioned in the fall of 1928 and spring of 1929 with the other five being commissioned in 1930–1932. Other new cutters that were contracted during Billard's tenure included six 165 ft (50 m) cutters that were designed for light icebreaking.

==== International Ice Patrol and oceanography ====
The International Ice Patrol (IIP) was reestablished in 1919 after being discontinued during World War I. President Wilson had established the Interdepartmental Board on International Service of Ice Observation, Ice Patrol, and Ocean Derelict Destruction in the fall of 1916 and the board included the Commandant of the Coast Guard, the hydrographer of the Navy, and the heads of the Weather, Standards, and Fisheries bureaus. The board had been directed to prepare a program of scientific studies to be carried out by the patrol cutters and to publish the reports of the researchers on the cutters. The Coast Guard Oceanographic Unit was established in 1923 and Billard directed Lieutenant Edward H. Smith to attend graduate studies in oceanography at Harvard University in 1924 and then to work with Vilhelm Bjerknes, a Norwegian meteorologist, and Norwegian oceanographers. Smith published Practical Means for Determining Ocean Currents in 1925 and sailed on the USCGC Tampa as an observer in the 1926 ice patrol season. Smith and other Coast Guard oceanographers helped in the understanding of how pack ice affected the drift of icebergs, thus helping the IIP track the iceberg's movements in shipping lanes. During Billard's term of office, the USCGC Marion was used as an oceanographic research vessel studying the waters near Greenland with hundreds of observations taken of water temperature and salinity as well as soundings. The soundings were used to correct nautical charts of the coastal waters. This would prove valuable information later during World War II when the Greenland Patrol was established.

==== Weather-related disasters ====
In September 1926 a hurricane hit the Florida coastline near Miami which killed 372 people. Billard organized a relief force of five cruising cutters and diverted four Rum Patrol destroyers to the area to aid hurricane victims. Crews patrolled the area to restore order and prevent looting, improvised hospitals for the wounded, searched for missing persons, and assisted local authorities. Coming just a few months after the hurricane, heavy spring rains caused the worst flooding along the Mississippi River and its tributaries known up until that time. Billard, as head of the Coast Guard, responded with relief efforts that included 674 officers and men, manning 128 vessels and boats. Over 44,000 people were rescued from the rising waters and 11,000 head of livestock were herded to safety. The service distributed food, clothing, medicine, and forage that was provided by the American Red Cross. Coast Guard vessels provided transportation for workers and materials needed for levee repair and served as escorts for the hundreds of public officials and news reporters that converged on the scene. Additionally, over 5,000 miles of levees were periodically inspected for damage. Even as the Coolidge Administration and several state governors questioned Federal government involvement in state affairs and the Federal government had not involved itself with disaster relief to any great extent before, Coast Guard search and rescue efforts in Florida and along the Mississippi Valley were conducted at the direction of Billard as one of the normal responsibilities assigned to the service.

=== Navy Cross Citation ===

The President of the United States of America takes pleasure in presenting the Navy Cross to Captain Frederick C. Billard, United States Coast Guard, for distinguished service in the line of his profession as Commanding Officer of the U.S.S. APHRODITE, engaged in the important, exacting and hazardous duty of transporting and escorting troops and supplies through waters infested with enemy submarines and mines, during World War I.

== Death ==
Billard was appointed by U.S. President Herbert Hoover to a third four-year term as Commandant in January 1932, but died of pneumonia nearly four months later on 17 May. He is buried at Arlington National Cemetery alongside his wife, Clara Prentis Billard. Billard was succeeded as Commandant by the appointment of Rear Admiral Harry G. Hamlet.

== Legacy ==
Billard presided over most of the Prohibition period with all of the required changes in personnel, vessels and rapidly-changing technology. He kept the service focused on its missions and the welfare of its men. He was noted for an interest in his men's education, morale and welfare. His insight into using updated technology to complete a diverse set of missions resulted in improvements in cutter design, increasing use of radios, and gave Coast Guard aviation a practical start. He insisted on absolute integrity for his officers and men so that the service's reputation would not be harmed during the prohibition era.

As CGA Superintendent in 1920, Billard established the school's motto, Scientiae Cedit Mare (The Sea Yields to Knowledge).

Billard moved the academy from Fort Trumbull to its current location in 1932, and expanded officer training to four years. His establishment of the Coast Guard Academy in New London helped put officer education on a solid footing.

An academy athletics facility completed in 1932 was named for him. Billard Hall is used for wrestling competition, and has fitness facilities and weight training equipment.

== See also ==
- Rum Patrol

== Notes ==
Footnotes

Citations

References cited

This article incorporates public domain material from U.S. Coast Guard Cutters and Craft Index. United States government.
This article incorporates text from the public domain Dictionary of American Naval Fighting Ships.

- Historian's Office, U.S. Coast Guard. "Frederick C. Billard, 1924–1932". Biographies of Coast Guard Commandants. U.S. Coast Guard. Archived from the original on 5 April 2013.
- "Billard Hall". Campus Athletic Facilities. U.S. Coast Guard Academy. Archived from the original on 10 May 2013.
- "Cryptology, Elizebeth Friedman and the United States Coast Guard Thwart the Rumrunners" (PDF). Cryptologic Heritage: Publications. National Security Agency. Archived from the original (PDF) on 18 September 2013.
- "Record of Movements, Vessels of the United States Coast Guard, 1790–December 31, 1933" (PDF). U.S. Coast Guard, Department of Transportation.
- Canney, Donald L. (1995). U.S. Coast Guard and Revenue Cutters, 1790–1935. Naval Institute Press, Annapolis, Maryland. ISBN 978-1-55750-101-1.
- Johnson, Robert Irwin (1987). Guardians of the Sea, History of the United States Coast Guard, 1915 to the Present. Naval Institute Press, Annapolis, Maryland. ISBN 978-0-87021-720-3.
- King, Irving H. (1996). The Coast Guard Expands, 1865–1915: New Roles, New Frontiers. Naval Institute Press, Annapolis, Maryland. ISBN 978-1-55750-458-6.
- Kroll, C. Douglas (2002). Commodore Ellsworth P. Bertholf: First Commandant of the Coast Guard. Naval Institute Press, Annapolis, Maryland. ISBN 978-1-55750-474-6.
- Larzelere, Alex (2003). The Coast Guard in World War I: An Untold Story. Naval Institute Press, Annapolis, Maryland. ISBN 978-1-55750-476-0.
- Noble, Dennis L. (1990). Historical Register U.S. Revenue Cutter Service Officers, 1790–1914. Coast Guard Historian's Office, U.S. Coast Guard Headquarters, Washington, DC.
- Shlaes, Amity (2013). Coolidge. HarperCollins Publishers, New York, New York. ISBN 978-0-06-196755-9.

Military offices
Preceded by William E. Reynolds	Commandant of the Coast Guard; 1924–1932	Succeeded by Harry G. Hamlet
