= USCGC Tallapoosa =

United States Coast Guard cutter

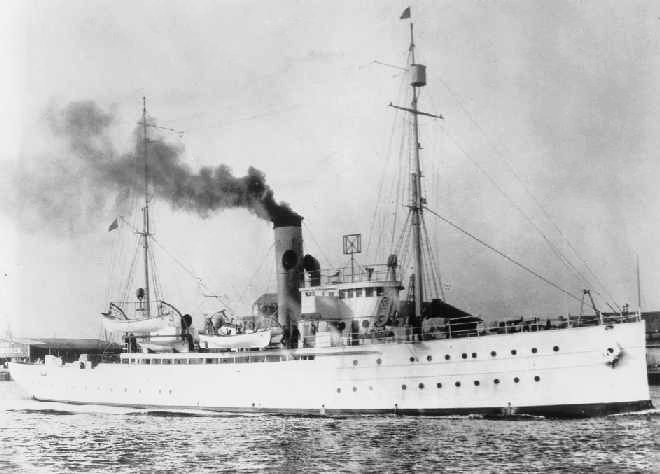
- USCGC Tallapoosa (WPG-52) in 1920.

History

United States
- Name: Tallapoosa
- Namesake: Tallapoosa River, Georgia
- Operator: United States Coast Guard
- Builder: Newport News Shipbuilding
- Cost: $225,000 USD
- Launched: 1 May 1915
- Commissioned: 12 August 1915
- Decommissioned: 8 November 1945
- Fate: Sold, 22 July 1946

General characteristics
- Class & type: Tallapoosa class cutter
- Displacement: 912 tons
- Length: 165 ft 10 in
- Beam: 32 ft
- Draft: 11 ft 9 in
- Installed power: 2 × Babcock & Wilcox boilers; 1,000 shaft horsepower
- Propulsion: Triple-expansion steam, 17", 27", and 44" diameter x 30" stroke,
- Speed: 12 knots
- Complement: 9 officers, 63 enlisted
- Armament: 4 × 6-pounders (1915); 2 × 6-pdrs; 2 × 3" 50-cal (single-mounts) (as of 1930); 2 × 3"/50 (single-mounts); 1 × 3"/23; 2 × depth charge tracks (as of 1941); 2 × 3"/50 (single-mounts); 2 × 20mm/80 (single-mounts); 2 × Mousetraps; 4 × K-guns; 2 × depth charge tracks (as of 1945).

USCGC Tallapoosa (WPG-52) was a United States Coast Guard cutter of the Tallapoosa-class and was designed to replace the revenue cutter Winona. Her hull was reinforced for light icebreaking. She was initially stationed at Mobile, Alabama, with cruising grounds to Lake Pontchartrain, Louisiana, and Fowey Rocks, Florida. During World War I she escorted convoys out of Halifax, Nova Scotia. After the war she served with the Bering Sea Patrol before returning to Savannah, Georgia, before World War II. During the war Tallapoosa assisted with convoy escort duty and anti-submarine patrols.

== History ==
Tallapoosa left Newport News, Virginia towed by USGCC Apache on 16 July 1915 and arrived at the Coast Guard Depot at Curtis Bay, Maryland, the following day. The officers and crew of Winona were transferred to her on 18 July and she was placed in commission at the depot 12 August 1915. She was assigned her first homeport at Mobile, Alabama on 17 August 1915. During this period she made search and rescue patrols between Port Eads, Louisiana, and Tampa, Florida. On 18 November 1915 she transported the National Currency Association of Alabama on a tour and inspection of the harbor of Mobile. On 19 January 1916 she participated in the celebration of the completion of the Gulf, Florida and Alabama Railroad held at Pensacola, Florida. On 6–7 March 1916 and on 19–20 February 1917, she participated in the Mardi Gras celebration at Mobile, Alabama.

=== U.S. Navy service during World War I ===
From 6 April 1917 until 28 August 1919, the U.S. Coast Guard was temporarily under the control of the U.S. Navy Department. (Note: All U.S. Coast Guard cutters serving with the U.S. Navy during World War I were designated "USS" even though they kept their Coast Guard crews. Tallapoosa was known as USS Tallapoosa while under Navy control.) On the morning of 9 April, crew members from Tallapoosa and Tampa boarded the Austrian steamer Borneo in Hillsboro Bay near Tampa and seized the ship and arrested the crew. Borneo was turned over to customs authorities and the crew was left in the custody of local authorities. After the seizure, Tallapoosa was assigned patrol duties on the approaches to Tampa harbor and the entrance to Egmont Key. Her commanding officer, First Lieutenant James F. Hottel, was assigned by the Seventh Naval District commander to inspect all motor boats used by the Navy in the Tampa area. In addition, he was responsible for recruiting personnel for the U.S. Naval Reserve. At the end of July 1917 Tallapoosa was transferred to Patrol Squadron One located at Guantanamo Bay, Cuba. In late August, she took the seized German steamship Constantia in tow at Cienfuegos, Cuba and delivered her to the naval station at New Orleans, Louisiana, on 8 September. Tallapoosa was then assigned to Key West, Florida, where the Navy used her for search and rescue work and towing. She towed barges from Key West to Norfolk, from New Orleans to Bermuda, and from Panama to Norfolk. After repairs at the Coast Guard Depot, she towed the naval ordnance barge Sargent from the Washington Navy Yard to New London, Connecticut and Portsmouth, New Hampshire.

In September 1918 she was sent to Boston, Massachusetts, where a battery of 3-inch guns were installed along with depth charges and releasing gear. On 7 November she was transferred to Halifax, Nova Scotia, for anti-submarine operations. After the armistice was signed ending the war on 11 November, she participated in search and rescue work in the North Atlantic. The cutter was almost crushed by ice during one incident involving the rescue of a group of stranded fishermen near Forteau Harbor. After breaking through the ice to the village and giving food and medical supplies to the natives and picking up the fishermen, she was caught in a snow storm in the sub-zero weather and almost crushed by ice before she could return to Halifax.

=== Postwar Gulf of Mexico service ===
On 4 March 1920, Tallapoosa resumed her patrols and returned to her old home port of Mobile. On 11 October 1920, she was assigned to the Gulf Division. On 3 August 1921 Tallapoosa arrived at Norfolk, Virginia, towing sub chasers, on the 29th she arrived at Tampa towing the cutter Arrow from Key West. On 3 December 1922, she returned to Key West from a cruise to Sanibel, Florida. On 10 December her cruising district was again established as that portion of the coast bordering on the Gulf of Mexico and extending from Port Eads to Tampa, with headquarters still at Mobile, Alabama. On 30 January 1924, Tallapoosa participated in the Gasparilla Carnival at Tampa. Sometime in 1924 she was in a collision with Japanese cargo ship Malta Maru off Pensacola, Florida, resulting in some damage to Malta Maru. On 23 February 1925, she also participated in the Mardi Gras celebration at Mobile. During September 1926 she was part of a task force organized to aid hurricane victims in Florida; her crew helping maintain order, improvising hospitals, and assisting in the search for the missing. (Note: The hurricane relief task force assigned by Commandant Frederick C. Billard consisted of the Coast Guard destroyers Downes, Shaw, Cassin, and Patterson; and cutters Seneca, Manning,Yamacraw, Saukee and Tallapoosa. Future Commandant, Commander Harry G. Hamlet was assigned the duty of commanding the task force. The 18 September hurricane killed 372 persons, most of them in the Miami, Florida, area. Coast Guard stations at Fort Lauderdale and Biscayne Bay were demolished and the floating base Mocassin and two patrol boats were driven ashore at Miami) On 2 January 1929, her permanent station was changed to Key West. On 9 November 1929 Tallapoosa arrived at the Coast Guard Depot where she underwent extensive repairs and alterations in preparation for assignment to the Bering Sea Patrol She departed for her new home port at Juneau, Alaska, on 10 December 1930, arriving there on 6 February 1931.

=== Bering Sea Patrol ===
Tallapoosa departed Juneau on 13 April 1931 for Dixon Entrance on Bering Sea Patrol duty. The next few years were spent doing sealing patrols and treaty enforcement in Alaskan waters, with occasional trips to Seattle, Washington, for drydocking and repair.

=== Savannah, Georgia ===
Tallapoosa departed Seattle for hew new permanent station at Savannah, Georgia, on 7 August 1937 and arrived at Savannah on 24 October. She spent the winter of 1939–1940 cruising on search and rescue missions in the Jacksonville, Florida, area. From 24 October 1940 to 24 November 1940, Tallapoosa spent time being rearmed at the plant of Todd Shipyard, Inc., at Algiers, Louisiana.

=== U.S. Navy service during World War II ===
In March 1941, Secretary of the Treasury Henry Morgenthau Jr. considered Tallapoosa and sister ship Ossipee along with Unalga and several other older cutters to be included in a Lend-lease agreement with Great Britain, but they were considered too old to be of much service and were retained by the Coast Guard. Ten newer Lake-class cutters were sent to the Lend-lease program instead. Tallapoosa remained in the 6th Naval District throughout World War II where she engaged in convoy and anti-submarine work. Between 30 May and 22 June 1942, she searched small areas where submarines had been sighted, but with negative results. She was rearmed, repaired, and altered at Merrill-Stevens Drydock & Repair Co. at Jacksonville late in 1942. Beginning in November 1942 Tallapoosa was assigned anti-submarine patrols in the Charleston, South Carolina area and some convoy escort duty. Although she reported several possible sonar contacts with submarines they did not result in any confirmed kills.

During January 1943, the principal activity of Tallapoosa was as an observing vessel for tests in connection with shore blackouts. She operated from the section base at Mayport, Florida, making nightly trips to a position south at St. John's light vessel, sometimes accompanied by USS Umpqua; which acted as a "target" vessel. The US Army Corps of Engineers made various arrangements of shore lighting in the vicinity of Jacksonville Beach, Florida. These lights varied in intensity and were measured aboard the cutter from seaward by civilian experts using photometers to determine the amount of light constituting a hazard to a merchant vessel passing between a submarine and a shore light. On one occasion the visibility of various navigational aids was tested. Proceeding to Jacksonville after three tests, the cutter underwent repairs until 28 February 1943, when she returned to her anti-submarine patrols in the 6th Naval District until the fall of 1945, when she was sent to Curtis Bay, Maryland, for decommissioning.

=== Decommissioning ===
Tallapoosa was decommissioned on 18 November 1945. On 22 July 1946 Tallapoosa was sold to the Caribbean Fruit and Steamship Company and renamed Santa Maria.

Tallapoosa's ships bell now resides in Tallapoosa, Georgia.

== Notes ==
Footnotes

Citations

References cited

- "Record of Movements, Vessels of the United States Coast Guard, 1790–December 31, 1933" (PDF). U.S. Coast Guard, Department of Transportation.
- "Tallapoosa, 1915". Cutters, Craft & U.S. Coast Guard-Manned Army & Navy Vessels. U.S. Coast Guard Historian's Office.
- "U.S. Cutter Tallapoosa 1915 (Bell)". Tallapoosa, Georgia website. Archived from the original on 23 February 2014.
- Canney, Donald L. (1995). U.S. Coast Guard and Revenue Cutters, 1790–1935. Naval Institute Press, Annapolis, Maryland. ISBN 978-1-55750-101-1.
- Larzelere, Alex (2003). The Coast Guard in World War I: An Untold Story. Naval Institute Press, Annapolis, Maryland. ISBN 978-1-55750-476-0.
- Scheina, Robert L. (1982). U.S. Coast Guard Cutters & Craft of World War II. Naval Institute Press, Annapolis, Maryland. ISBN 978-0-87021-717-3.
- Scheina, Robert L. (1990). U.S. Coast Guard Cutters & Craft, 1946–1990. Naval Institute Press, Annapolis, Maryland. ISBN 978-0-87021-719-7.
- Walling, Michael G. (2004). Bloodstained Sea: the U.S. Coast Guard in the Battle of the Atlantic, 1941–1944. International Marine/McGraw-Hill, Camden, Maine. ISBN 978-0-07-142401-1.
