= USCGC Marion =

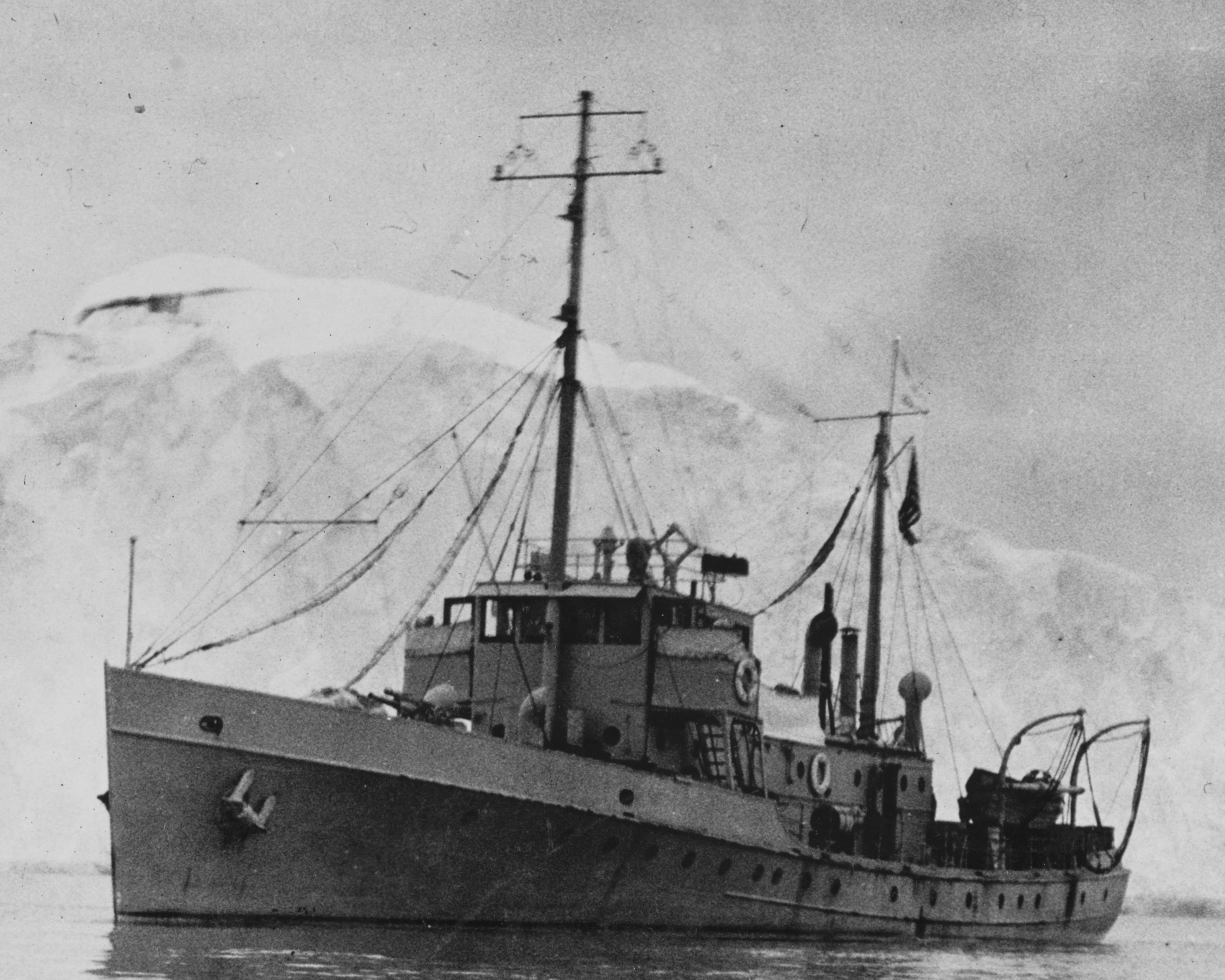
- USCGC Marion in Baffin Bay (August 1928)

History

United States
- Name: USCGC Marion
- Namesake: Francis Marion, American Revolutionary War general
- Operator: U.S. Coast Guard
- Builder: American Brown Boveri Electric Corporation, Camden, New Jersey
- Cost: $63,163 USD
- Launched: 15 March 1927
- Commissioned: 6 April 1927
- Decommissioned: 15 February 1962
- Fate: Sold 8 March 1963 to Robert F. Solomon of Norfolk, Virginia and renamed Top Cat

General characteristics
- Class & type: Active-class patrol boat
- Displacement: 232 tons (trial)
- Length: 125 ft (38 m)
- Beam: 23 ft 6 in (7.16 m)
- Draft: 7 ft 6 in (2.29 m)
- Installed power: After 1938 re-engining: 1,200 brake horsepower (0.9 megawatt)
- Propulsion: As built: Two 6-cylinder 300 brake horsepower diesel engines; After 1938 re-engining: Two Cooper-Bessemer EN-8 600 brake horsepower diesel engines
- Speed: As built: 10 knots; In 1945: 12 knots (maximum); 7 knots (economical)
- Range: In 1945: 2,900 nautical miles (5,370 kilometers) at 10 knots; 4,000 nautical miles (7,400 kilometers) at 7 knots
- Complement: 20 (3 officers, 17 enlisted men) (1930); 46 (5 officers, 41 men) (1945)
- Sensors & processing systems: Sonar (1945) QCO-1; Detection radar (1960) SPS-23
- Armament: In 1927: 1 x 3-inch (76.2-millimeter) 23-caliber gun; In 1941: 1 x 3-inch (76.2-mm) 23-caliber gun, 2 x depth charge tracks; In 1945: 1 x 3-inch (76.2-mm) 23-caliber gun, 2 x single 20-mm 80-caliber gun mounts, 2 x depth charge tracks, 2 x Mousetraps1 x 3-inch (76.2-mm) 23-caliber gun1 x 3-inch (76.2-mm) 23-caliber gun; In 1960: 1 x single 40-mm 60-caliber antiaircraft gun mount
- Notes: Sold 8 March 1963

USCGC Marion (WSC-145), was a 125 ft (38 m) United States Coast Guard Active-class patrol boat in commission from 1927 to 1962. She was named for Francis Marion, an American Revolutionary War general who was known for his unconventional warfare tactics. Marion served during the Rum Patrol and World War II performing defense, law enforcement, ice patrol, and search and rescue missions. Most notably, Marion served as the platform for the first intensive oceanographic studies made by the Coast Guard.

== Construction and commissioning ==
Marion was built by American Brown Boveri Electric Corporation at Camden, New Jersey. She was commissioned as USCGC Marion (WSC-145) on 6 April 1927. She was the eleventh of the Active-class patrol boats to be commissioned, which were designed for trailing the "mother ships" that supported the smuggling boats of "rum-runners" during Prohibition. The Active-class ships were also referred to unofficially as the "Buck & a Quarter" class in reference to their 125-foot length.

== Marion expedition to Davis Strait ==
Marion was initially assigned Rum Patrol duties with a home-port of New London, Connecticut, however, Lieutenant Commander Edward H. Smith had been directed by Coast Guard Commandant Frederick C. Billard to outfit her as an oceanographic research vessel for an expedition to Arctic waters off the coast of Greenland. The purpose of the expedition was to attempt to find information about the formation of icebergs and their movements. Marion was loaded with supplies and provisions for 70 days of cruising and spare parts for every piece of machinery on board. The complement was increased to two officers, two warrant officers and 23 men; six more than her normal complement. Marion departed Boston, Massachusetts, on 11 July 1928, stopped briefly at Halifax, Nova Scotia, and arrived at Sydney, Nova Scotia, where fuel and water supplies were topped off and 78 drums of fuel were stowed on deck. While at both Halifax and Sydney, Smith consulted local mariners familiar with the Labrador Sea and Davis Strait and updated the ship's charts with information from the mariner's charts.

Departing Sydney on 16 July using only one engine to conserve fuel, Marion headed through the Strait of Belle Isle and began her oceanographic survey mission. Initially, only Smith and his executive officer, Lieutenant Noble Ricketts, had the knowledge of how to sample the Arctic waters for temperature and salinity but they trained additional men to handle the instruments used for the survey. At each stop the ship's position was noted and a sounding was made while the temperature and salinity samples were collected. With 2,400 m (7,900 ft) of sample wire in the water, both winches that handled the sampling equipment failed on 27 July. The crew managed to retrieve the wire in the dark in three hours by using the anchor windlass to heave the line in. In the meantime, one failed winch was repaired using parts scavenged from a spare and the line was spooled back onto the winch. The repair evolution was completed by morning with one winch operational. By July 31, Danish officials in Greenland had radioed permission for Marion to put into Godthaab for repairs to the other winch and the crew worked through the day to remove the two ton winch to shore for repair and replace it on the deckhouse. Marion departed Godthaab that evening with repairs completed.

After four days sailing a gale forced Marion to seek shelter at Godhavn where the crew was granted liberty. To Smith's surprise diesel fuel was available and he took the opportunity to fill the ship's fuel tanks. With the unexpected acquisition of fuel, when Marion departed Godhavn, she was able to do so on both engines. After completing a line of sample stations to the north, she returned to top off fuel and water tanks before heading across to Baffin Bay, all the while taking soundings and samples. Samples were taken along the coast of Baffin Island and a 450 mi (720 km) line across Davis Strait during the month of August ending at Ivigtut, the site of a cryolite mine that was Greenland's main source of income during that period. After re-provisioning and fueling, she headed back to sea only to be forced to shelter under Mount Kungmat for three days before departing Cape Farewell on a 620 mi (1,000 km) station line to Belle Isle. A storm prevented entering the Strait of Belle Isle so Smith decided to put in at St. John's, Newfoundland, for a liberty and supplies. While en route, Smith managed to run two unscheduled station lines along the Newfoundland coastal shelf. Marion arrived at St. John's on 11 September and departed for New London the next day, her scientific mission accomplished. She arrived at New London on 19 September 1928 after having traveled 8,100 mi (13,000 km) and taken observations at 191 oceanographic stations with some 2,000 observations of temperature and salinity. Numerous bottom samples had been taken and soundings were added to the charts of the area. The Marion expedition observations demonstrated that pack ice had a direct influence on the drift of icebergs. Heavy pack ice along the Newfoundland and Labrador shelf waters prevented icebergs from being carried to shore and forced them to enter shipping lanes to the south. Little ice on the shelves allowed the icebergs to ground on the Newfoundland coast, where they were harmless. The expedition was the beginning of a long involvement by the Coast Guard in Greenland and its surrounding waters.

== Patrol duties during the Depression ==
Since Marion had originally been designed specifically for prohibition enforcement service, after the specialized oceanographic equipment was removed she resumed Rum Patrol duty with a home-port of New London. Her routine consisted of picketing liquor laden "mother ships" and preventing them from offloading prohibited cargo to smaller contact boats that were used to deliver liquor to shore. In 1933, Marion was assigned the home-port of Norfolk, Virginia. With the end of prohibition, she assumed a more traditional role of a Coast Guard cutter, that of search and rescue, law enforcement, merchant vessel inspection, and defense training. (Note: The repeal of Prohibition was accomplished with the ratification of the Twenty-first Amendment on 5 December 1933.) Marion was transferred later to patrol duties out of St. Thomas, Virgin Islands. On 1 November 1940 she was transferred to U.S. Navy control out of Charlotte Amalie, Virgin Islands, where she performed wartime patrols and convoy escort duty.

== World War II service ==
Marion served on anti-submarine patrols with the Navy's Caribbean Sea Frontier Squadron based at Charlotte Amalie during World War II. On 14 October 1943, off Mayaguez, Puerto Rico, she assisted with the evacuation of the crew of EM Dow which had been badly damaged by squalls on a passage from Baltimore, Maryland. Marion made a lee for the stricken ship and rescued all 37 crewmembers of Dow without loss of life. (Note: EM Dow (WYP-353) was originally the former fishing vessel Annie Dow acquired by the Coast Guard under charter on 24 June 1943. She was assigned to Caribbean Sea Frontier Squadron. The prefix "EM" stood for "Emergency Manning".)

== Post-war service ==
Marion was released from Navy service on 1 January 1946 and was reassigned duties out of Norfolk consisting of law enforcement and search and rescue work. In June 1955, she towed Siboney to safety from 300 mi (480 km) east of Norfolk.

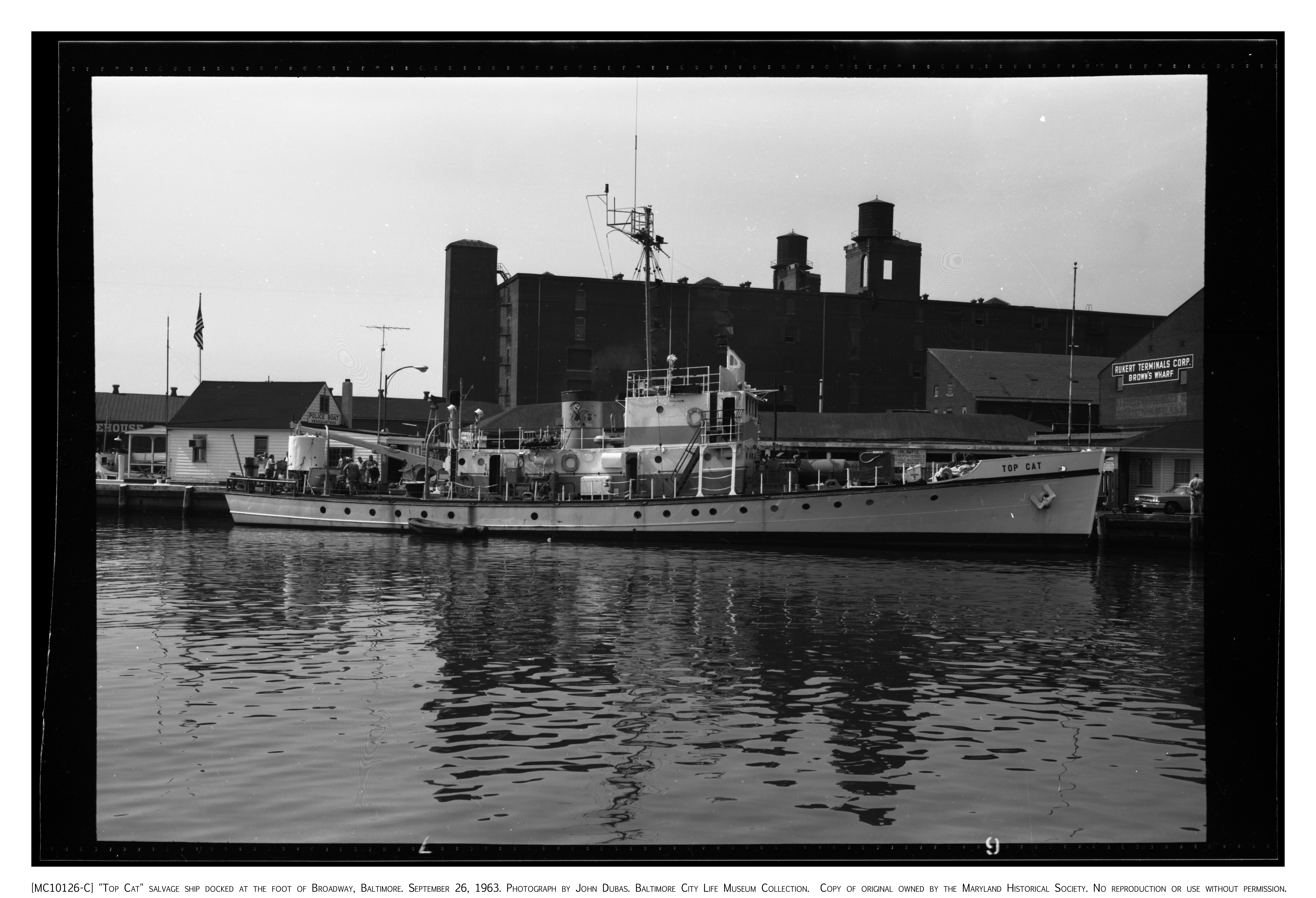
Top Cat

Marion was decommissioned on 15 February 1962 and sold 8 March 1963 to Robert F. Solomon of Norfolk who renamed her Top Cat.

== Awards ==
- American Defense Service Medal
- American Campaign Medal
- World War II Victory Medal
- National Defense Service Medal with star

== See also ==
- Rum Patrol
- List of Arctic expeditions
