= USCGC Itasca (1907) =

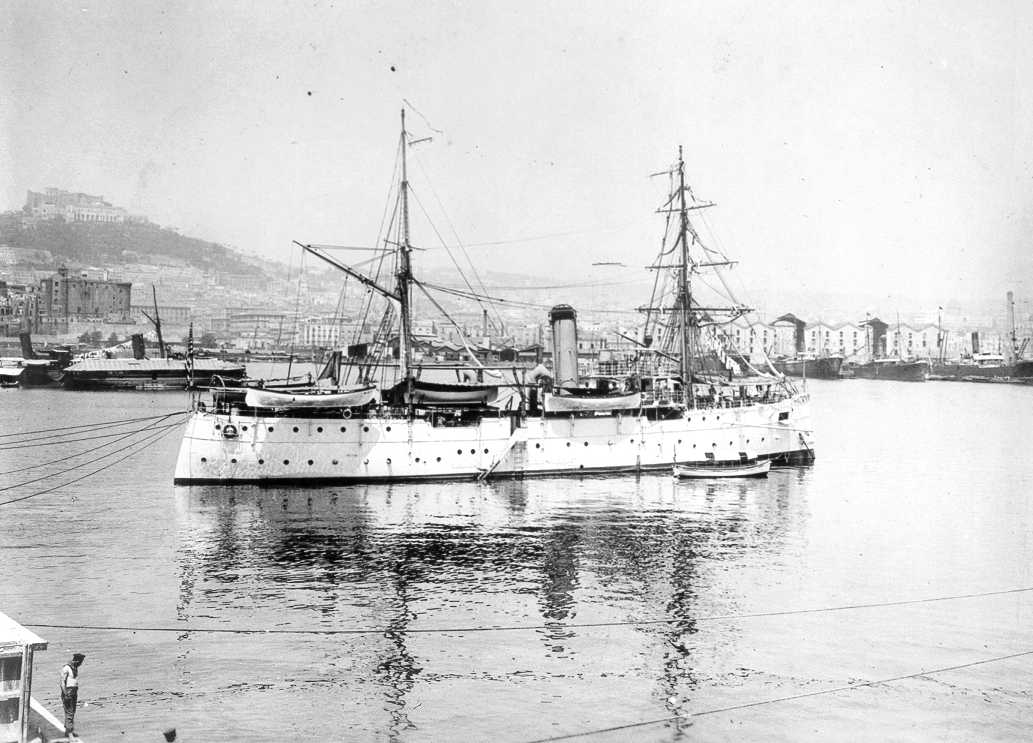
- Itasca in 1907

History

United States
- Name: Itasca
- Namesake: Lake Itasca
- Owner: U.S. Coast Guard
- Builder: Moore & Sons
- Laid down: 1891
- Launched: 30 April 1892
- Sponsored by: Miss Mary Frances Moore
- Recommissioned: 17 July 1907, as the Itasca
- Decommissioned: 1922
- Renamed: 23 July 1906
- Fate: Sold, 11 May 1922

General characteristics
- Length: 190 feet
- Propulsion: triple expansion steam engine
- Sail plan: brigantine

The Itasca was a 190-foot US Coast Guard brigantine-rigged cutter.

The ship was launched in 1892 as the USS Bancroft, a U.S Navy training ship. Its commissioning ushered in a new age of training with more modern equipment, and a triple-expansion steam engine that could power the cutter when sailing was not possible.

In 1907, the Bancroft was recommissioned as the Itasca, named after Lake Itasca in Minnesota. The Coast Guard sold the Itasca in 1922.

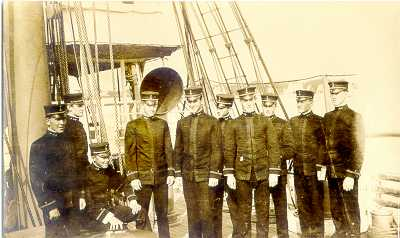
Revenue Cutter Service cadets on Itasca before 1915
