= USCGC Ossipee =

United States Coast Guard cutter launched in 1915

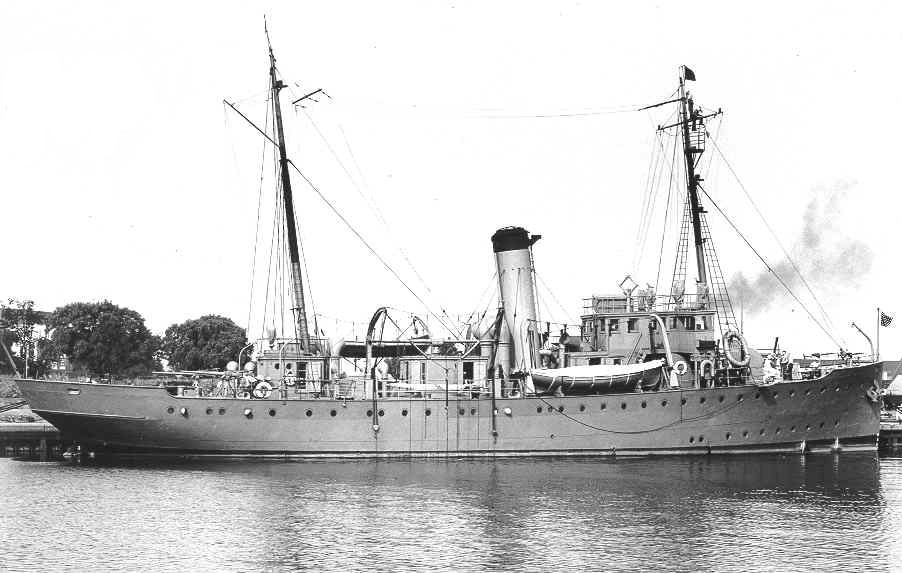
- USCGC Ossipee (WPR-50), 1943

History

United States
- Name: Ossipee
- Namesake: Ossipee River, New Hampshire
- Operator: United States Coast Guard
- Builder: Newport News Shipbuilding
- Launched: 1 May 1915
- Sponsored by: Sallie Fleming McAdoo
- Commissioned: 28 July 1915
- Decommissioned: 6 December 1945
- Fate: Sold, 18 September 1946

General characteristics
- Class & type: Tallapoosa-class cutter
- Displacement: 964 tons
- Length: 165 ft 10 in (50.55 m)
- Beam: 32 ft (9.8 m)
- Draft: 11 ft 9 in (3.58 m)
- Propulsion: Triple expansion steam, 17-inch, 27 in, 44 in dia. x 30 in stroke single propeller, 1,000 shp (746 kW)
- Speed: 12.3 knots (22.8 km/h; 14.2 mph)
- Range: 2,000 nmi (3,700 km) at 12.3 knots (22.8 km/h; 14.2 mph); cruising speed of 7.5 knots (13.9 km/h; 8.6 mph), and a 4,265 nmi (7,899 km) range
- Complement: 6 officers, 4 warrant officers, 54 enlisted (1917)
- Armament: 4 × 6-pounders (1915); 2 × 6-pdrs; 2 × 3"/50 cal guns (single mounts) (as of 1930); 2 × 3"/50 (single mounts); 1 × 3"/23; 2 × depth charge tracks (as of 1941); 2 × 3"/50 (single mounts); 2 × 20 mm/80 (single-mounts); 2 × Mousetraps; 4 × K-guns; 2 × depth charge tracks (as of 1945).)

USCGC Ossipee (WPR-50) was a United States Coast Guard cutter of the Tallapoosa class constructed by Newport News Shipbuilding of Newport News, Virginia, and commissioned 28 July 1915. Her hull was strengthened for light icebreaking operations. She was assigned a homeport of Portland, Maine, after commissioning and cruised as far south as Cape Ann, Massachusetts, serving in a law enforcement and search and rescue capacity. She saw service in both World War I and World War II.

== World War I ==
=== Coastal patrol ===
USCGC Ossipee, Captain William H. Munter, commanding, was en route from Portland, Maine, to Boston, Massachusetts, on 6 April 1917, when Congress declared that a state of war existed between the United States and the German Empire. On arrival at Boston, the cutter received orders to proceed to the mouth of the Kennebec River, Maine, and Captain Munter was assigned to the commander of that defensive area with additional duties connected with the patrol of the river mouth and the adjacent coastline. Returning to Portland, where she arrived on 7 April, a stay in port of a few days was made, and on 11 April, Ossipee proceeded to her station, arriving there on the same day, orders were received assigning Ossipee to duty with the Nantucket Detachment, Patrol Force. After coaling at Melville, Rhode Island, and painting the ship the regulation war color, she left Newport, Rhode Island, and proceeded on 23 April to her new station, where she arrived the same day. She continued to guard that area and patrol until 5 May, when she was ordered to report to the Portsmouth Naval Shipyard at Kittery, Maine, for refit of her guns. The four 6-pound guns were replaced by a battery of four 3-inch guns. Ossipee continued to serve with the Nantucket Detachment until orders were received to report to the Boston Navy Yard to be outfitted for overseas duty.

=== Gibraltar convoy duty ===
==== Danger zone escort ====
Ossipee was prepared and outfitted for this important duty at the Boston Navy Yard, and on 15 August she sailed for Gibraltar. She arrived there on 30 August. The commanding officer reported to the U.S. Patrol Commander and paid an official call on the senior British naval officer of that port. Here the cutter was assigned to duty with Squadron Two of the patrol forces based at Gibraltar. On 3 September, she joined her first convoy as a "danger zone" escort. This duty generally lasted several days.

On outbound convoys, the danger zone escort would escort the convoy to a meeting with the ocean escort at sea. The danger zone escort would return to base while the convoy proceeded to its destination under the protection of only one warship, the ocean escort. On inbound convoys, the danger zone escort relieved the ocean escort from duty and accompanied the convoys into the ports of destination, generally when the convoys were within a short distance of their port of destination. Ossipee served as a danger zone escort from the time of her arrival at Gibraltar until 30 October, with the exception of three special service cruises of short duration.

==== Ocean escort ====
On 30 October, the cutter again left Gibraltar, this time as the ocean escort for a convoy bound for England. This was the tenth convoy with which she had been associated, but the first for which she was the ocean escort. The convoy having arrived safely in British waters, Ossipee proceeded to Plymouth, then later to Devonport, where she arrived on 8 November.

On 13 November, Ossipee left for Gibraltar with another convoy acting as the ocean escort, and arrived at her destination on 27 November. She continued to make alternate cruises from Gibraltar to British waters and from British ports to Gibraltar until the war came to an end. There were two exceptions, however, when she was the ocean escort for convoys between Gibraltar and Bizerte, Tunisia.

==== First action ====
While most of the convoys on which Ossipee served as ocean escort were not attacked, there was one exception. Leaving Milford Haven, Wales, on 13 December with a convoy bound for Gibraltar, good progress was made. On the morning of the 15 December at 9:10 a.m., a German U-boat torpedoed the merchant steamer Bernard. This ship, which belonged to "Column YA," had been out of position. In proceeding toward her proper position, she was struck in the starboard quarter. Bernard was on Ossipee's starboard quarter, just abeam the commodore's ship. The latter was the leading ship in the right column.

Ossipee sounded "general quarters," and in an attempt to drop depth charges on the unseen enemy, the cutter made full speed and the helm was cut hard to port. Ossipee was assisted in this work by some of the danger zone escort ships, while others rescued the survivors from Bernard, which sank at 10:01 a.m. While a search was made for the track of the torpedo and for signs of the wake of the submarine, nothing was seen. The convoy, in the meantime, under the direction of the commodore, had zigzagged to the left by using starboard helm and was already some distance away. "Secure" was sounded at 10:20 a.m., and Ossipee and the danger zone escort vessels that had been searching for the enemy U-boat proceeded at full speed to rejoin the convoy.

==== Torpedo near miss ====
The same day, at about 5:06 p.m., another attack was made on this convoy, the wake of the torpedo being seen in the midst of the ships in convoy about 700 yards (640 m) distant. The torpedo, continuing its course, passed almost directly under the stern of Ossipee. It passed about 25 yards (23 m) astern of the commodore's ship and harmlessly through the convoy. The general alarm having been sounded, Ossipee's crew stood to general quarters at the first sign of the enemy torpedo.

A slick, apparently that of the submarine, was seen about 75 yards (69 m) off the starboard beam of the cutter. The ship was turned rapidly and, running over the spot, two depth charges were dropped. At no time did the submarine make an appearance. The search was continued until 5:45 p.m. Full speed was ordered and Ossipee overtook the convoy, and the course was continued to Gibraltar without further incident. The danger zone escort joined with the convoy on 21–22 December and the whole fleet arrived at the base on the latter date.

==== Refit at Gibraltar ====
During the stay at Gibraltar, new and improved releasing gear was installed on the cutter. This was intended to make the cutter more effective in combating U-boats with depth charges. A few weeks prior, Lewis guns had been supplied.

==== Ships in convoy sunk ====
Ossipee continued cruising between Gibraltar and British ports until 10 March 1918, when she was sent with a convoy from Gibraltar to Bizerte. The squadron arrived on 16 March. Leaving on 16 March with her nineteenth convoy bound for Gibraltar, the convoy was attacked at 6:30 p.m. the next day. The steamer Ivydene was torpedoed and sunk. At 1:25 a.m. on 18 March, the steamer John H. Barry was also torpedoed and sunk. Ossipee, being with the convoy, but some distance from the ships attacked, did not see either of these. It was learned, however, that these two ships bad been sunk and that survivors were on board several vessels of the danger zone escort. At 6:37 p.m. of the same day, the convoy was subjected to a third attack. The merchant ship Saldhana of "WC" column was torpedoed and sunk, the survivors being picked up by the tug Alice. On this occasion, the general alarm was sounded and all hands called to general quarters on Ossipee. The cutter proceeded at full speed to the place where the submarine had disappeared and dropped two depth charges as close to the spot as could be ascertained in the darkness, but with no apparent result. "Secure" was sounded at 7:17 p.m. and the convoy continued on its way to Gibraltar arriving at that port without further loss on 21 March.

==== Submarine sighting ====
After being drydocked at the base, Ossipee, on 26 April, resumed her voyages from Gibraltar to British waters and returned as the ocean escort for different convoys bound in those directions. On 29 April, a signal was received from the commodore's ship stating that a submarine had been sighted. Ossipee proceeded at full speed and called all hands to general quarters. A second signal was received stating that the U-boat was 3 miles (4.8 km) astern of the convoy and that it had submerged.

The cutter proceeded to steam for the enemy's wake and dropped seven depth mines as nearly as could be ascertained around the spot where it had disappeared and zigzagged at full speed all around its supposed position, but apparently without result. On 1 May, the danger zone escort joined up with the convoy and on 3 May, Ossipee proceeded to Pembroke Dock, Wales, where she arrived the same day.

==== Torpedo wake ====
On 14 May, the cutter left Pembroke Dock, joined up with a convoy at Milford Haven, and left for Gibraltar. The danger zone escort was present until 16 May. This was the twenty-first convoy with which Ossipee had been connected since her arrival overseas. Continuing on her voyage the danger zone escort from Gibraltar joined the fleet on 21 May, and all of the ships arrived safely at the base on 23 May. No enemy attack was made during this cruise, nor did Ossipee encounter any more submarines until 18 October.

While on the voyage from Gibraltar to British waters, convoy HG 133, the thirteenth she had accompanied as ocean escort, was attacked. Seneca and the commissioned merchant steamer City of Oxford were also acting as ocean escorts with this convoy. At 1:47 p.m. that day, City of Oxford signaled that she had sighted a torpedo wake crossing the convoy and that the torpedo had passed close to her stern. The general alarm was sounded and all hands being at quarters, Ossipee proceeded at full speed to the vicinity of the spot where it was supposed that the submarine had fired the torpedo.

One depth charge was dropped, but no signs of the submarine, its wake, or the wake of the torpedo was seen. Seneca also joined in the hunt for the submarine, but four depth charges released by that ship resulted in no indication of damage inflicted from what was thrown up by the exploding depth charges. Captain Wheeler, in his official report stated that, while there was little doubt that City of Oxford did see the torpedo, it appeared that it had been fired at long range, making it very difficult to locate the enemy. No damage had been done to any vessel of the convoy or the ocean escort.

On 19 October, the danger zone escort joined the convoy, and three days later, on 22 October, the fleet arrived safely in home waters. Ossipee and Seneca proceeded to Pembroke Dock, Wales, in company where they arrived later the same day, having anchored in Dale Roads on 21 October.

==== Investigation of gun flash ====
Ossipee remained at Pembroke Dock until 26 October, when she proceeded to Falmouth, England. She joined another Gibraltar-bound convoy on 27 October.

On 28 October at 5:22 p.m. a gun flash was sighted on the port beam of the convoy. All hands were called to quarters and under full speed, the cutter proceeded to the vicinity where the flash was seen and dropped two depth charges near the spot. No evidence of a submarine was found, but it was always deemed necessary and good policy to drop one or more depth charges for the purpose of reminding the enemy that his presence was known, even if his position was not. There can be no doubt but that similar actions had caused the enemy on more than one occasion to either postpone or cancel a contemplated attack on the convoy.

Releasing these two canisters at 5:35 p.m. and seeing nothing of the enemy, "secure" was sounded and Ossipee rejoined the convoy, which proceeded to its rendezvous with the Gibraltar Danger Zone Escort on 31 October. Nothing further of interest happened and the fleet arrived safely at Gibraltar on 2 November. Ossipee remained until 8 November, when she left on a return voyage to British waters with the last convoy with which she was to be associated with during the period of hostilities.

==== Armistice Day ====
Sailing that day with her 32nd convoy, the fleet was joined by the danger zone escort which, however, left in a few days and on 16 November arrived safely in British waters. On the day of the Armistice, 11 November, at noon, Ossipee, with her convoy at 39°51'N, 11°50'W, turned on the regular navigation lights indicating that news had been received of the cessation of hostilities. The convoy having dispersed on arrival at its destination, Ossipee proceeded to Devonport, England.

=== Summary of wartime service ===
While the cutter was within the war zone, she was associated with thirty-two convoys and convoyed 596 vessels. In 23 of these, she served as the ocean escort. She also made three special cruises. Ossipee or other ships of her convoys observed submarines or evidence of their presence eight times, and the convoys were actually attacked seven times, with the loss of four merchant ships sunk. Ossipee, herself, was attacked once, barely escaping destruction as the torpedo missed her by 15–20 feet (4.6–6.1 m).

== Post-World War I service ==
Post-war Ossipee returned to New England waters and participated in the International Ice Patrol and the Rum Patrol.

On 17 November 1924 Ossipee rescued the crew of barge Canesto that was sinking in the Atlantic Ocean between New York City and Rockland, Maine, when the tug Kingfisher's steering failed in a gale.

On 27 December 1925, Ossipee was among the vessels responding to a fire aboard the Edward J. Lawrence moored in Portland Harbor, at the time the last remaining six-masted schooner afloat. Efforts to extinguish the blaze were unsuccessful as thousands of people looked on, with the Edward J. Lawrence ultimately maneuvered aground in shallow waters nearby and allowed to burn and sink.

In 1936, Ossipee was transferred to the Great Lakes and homeported at Cleveland, Ohio.

== World War II ==
=== Attempted rescue of barge ===
On 2 December 1942, the cutters Ossipee and Crocus, along with motor lifeboats from Coast Guard Station Lorain and Coast Guard Station Cleveland, proceeded to the assistance of the barge Cleveco, reported in distress 10 miles (16 km) off Avon Point. The barge was being towed by the tugboat Admiral when the latter suddenly sunk. The Captain of the Port dispatched an airplane to the scene and located Cleveco about 10 miles (16 km) east of Cleveland, Ossipee, advised of the correct position, located the barge, with 19 men on board. A heavy northwesterly gale with a snowstorm prevented Ossipee from taking the barge in tow. but she stood by to remove the crew if possible. However, the cutter was not able to carry out this rescue. On 3 December, Cleveco foundered with all hands. Eight bodies of the crew were recovered.

=== Routine patrols ===
During April 1943, Ossipee engaged in routine patrols in Lake Erie and at Cleveland and also made practice cruises and performed routine duties. During August 1943, she was engaged in training cruises and gun target practice. During October, she engaged in routine training operations on Lake Erie and on the Detroit River and St. Clair Rivers. On 22 October 1943, the U.S. Army Corps of Engineers derrick barge Tonowanda and two dump scows went ashore east of Cleveland harbor during a storm, and Ossipee was dispatched to stand by and assist. Ossipee and other Coast Guard equipment re-floated the vessels the next day, and Ossipee later towed the scows to Cleveland. During December 1943, she was on training operations on Lake Erie.

=== Drills and exercises ===
Early in June 1945, she conducted drills and exercises in Lake Erie, later in the month towing U.S. Navy YF-737 to Chicago, and returning to Cleveland. Early in July, she towed a pontoon for LST-512 from Buffalo to Rochester, New York, and returned from Buffalo to Erie. VJ Day found her still on duty in the 9th (Cleveland) Naval District, where she remained until 18 September 1946, when she was declared surplus and sold by the Maritime Commission to Mr. Harold H. Neff, East Cleveland, Ohio.

== Notes ==
=== References ===
- Ossipee (1915), U.S. Coast Guard Historian's Office website
- "Annual report of the Supervising Inspector-general Steamboat-inspection Service, Year ending June 30, 1925". Penn State University.
- Canney, Donald L. (1995). U.S. Coast Guard and Revenue Cutters, 1790–1935. Naval Institute Press, Annapolis, Maryland. ISBN 978-1-55750-101-1.
- Larzelere, Alex (2003). The Coast Guard in World War I: An Untold Story. Naval Institute Press, Annapolis, Maryland. ISBN 978-1-55750-476-0.
- Scheina, Robert L. (1982). U.S. Coast Guard Cutters & Craft of World War II. Naval Institute Press, Annapolis, Maryland. ISBN 978-0-87021-717-3.
- U.S. Coast Guard. Public Information Division. Historical Section (1949): The Coast Guard at War: Transports and Escorts (Vol. V). (Washington, DC: Public Information Division, U.S. Coast Guard Headquarters.
