= USS Bancroft (1892) =

Gunboat of the United States Navy

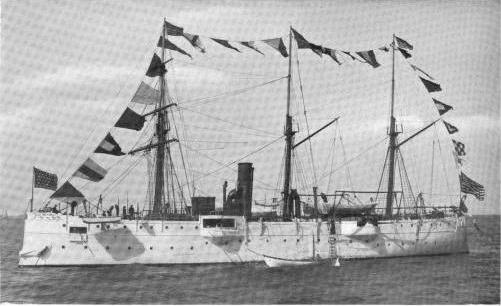
- Bancroft, photographed by William H. Rau circa 1898

History

United States Navy
- Name: USS Bancroft
- Namesake: George Bancroft, 17th Secretary of the Navy
- Builder: Samuel L. Moore & Sons, Elizabethport, New Jersey
- Laid down: 1891
- Launched: 30 April 1892
- Commissioned: 3 March 1893
- Decommissioned: 30 September 1898
- Recommissioned: 6 October 1902
- Decommissioned: 2 March 1905
- Stricken: 30 June 1906
- Fate: Transferred to U.S. Revenue Cutter Service 30 June 1906

U.S. Revenue Cutter Service
- Name: USRC Itasca
- Namesake: Lake Itasca, a lake located in central Minnesota.
- Acquired: 30 June 1906
- Commissioned: 17 July 1907
- Fate: Became part of U.S. Coast Guard fleet 28 January 1915

United States Coast Guard
- Name: USCGC Itasca
- Namesake: Previous name retained
- Acquired: 28 January 1915
- Decommissioned: 11 May 1922
- Fate: Sold 11 May 1922

General characteristics
- Type: Gunboat
- Displacement: 839 long tons (852 t)
- Length: 189 ft 5 in (57.73 m)
- Beam: 32 ft (9.8 m)
- Draft: 12 ft 11 in (3.94 m)
- Propulsion: 2 x triple expansion steam engine, twin screw
- Speed: 14.3 kn (16.5 mph; 26.5 km/h)
- Complement: 130 (U.S. Navy); 8 officers; 64 enlisted (U.S. Revenue Cutter Service)
- Armament: 4 × 4 in (100 mm) guns; 2 × 6 pounder (57 mm (2.24 in)) guns; 2 × 3 pounder (47 mm (1.85 in)) guns; 1 × 1 pounder (37 mm (1.46 in)) gun, 1 × 37-mm Hotchkiss revolving cannon; 1 × Gatling gun.

USS Bancroft was a United States Navy steel gunboat in commission from 1893 to 1898 and again from 1902 to 1905. She saw service during the Spanish–American War. After her U.S. Navy career, she was in commission in the United States Revenue Cutter Service from 1907 to 1915 as the revenue cutter USRC Itasca, and in the Revenue Cutter Service's successor service, the United States Coast Guard, as the cutter USCGC Itasca from 1915 to 1922. During her Coast Guard career, she saw service during World War I.

== Construction and commissioning ==
Bancroft was laid down in 1891 at Elizabethport, New Jersey, by Samuel L. Moore & Sons Shipyard and launched on 30 April 1892. She was commissioned on 3 March 1893 at the New York Navy Yard in Brooklyn, New York, with Miss Mary Frances Moore as sponsor.

== U.S. Navy history ==
=== Naval Academy training ship ===
Bancroft was designated as a training ship for the United States Naval Academy midshipmen and stationed at Annapolis, Maryland. Similar in shape to a small gunboat, the ship had a steel hull and a relatively heavy armament, ranging from 4-inch rapid-fire guns to a Gatling gun and a torpedo tube, to give midshipmen experience on the Navy's latest weaponry. Between 1893 and 1896, she cruised along the United States East Coast, visiting various shipyards with groups of midshipmen embarked. Naval expansion brought a corresponding increase on the Naval Academy's enrollment, and Bancroft quickly proved to be too small. After the practice cruise of 1896, she was converted into a conventional gunboat with a reduced armament and the original three-masted barkentine rig cut down to the two masts of a brigantine.

=== Patrol ===
On 15 September 1896, Bancroft sailed to join the European Squadron and for the next 15 months protected American interests in the eastern Mediterranean. Called home as relations between the United States and Spain deteriorated early in 1898, Bancroft reached Boston, Massachusetts, on 4 April 1898. The Spanish–American War began on 25 April 1898 when the United States Congress declared war on Spain, retroactive to 21 April, and Bancroft served with the North Atlantic Squadron from 9 May to 9 August 1898. She convoyed troop transports to Cuba and was on blockade duty at Havana and the Isle of Pines. On 28 July 1898, Bancroft seized the small Spanish schooner Ensenada de Cortez but returned the boat to her owner the next day because it was essentially valueless. The war ended on 13 August 1898, and Bancroft returned to Boston on 2 September 1898 and was decommissioned on 30 September 1898.

Recommissioned on 6 October 1902, Bancroft served until 1905 as a station ship at San Juan, Puerto Rico, cruising in the West Indies. She operated along the coast of Panama in 1903 during the separation of Panama from Colombia. During 1904 she returned to patrol duties in the West Indies. On 29 January 1905 she departed San Juan and steamed to the New York Navy Yard, where she spent a month. On 24 February 1905 she arrived at Norfolk, Virginia, where she subsequently was decommissioned on 2 March 1905. Bancroft was transferred to the United States Revenue Cutter Service on 30 June 1906.

== U.S. Revenue Cutter Service and Coast Guard history ==
=== Revenue Cutter Service ===
The Revenue Cutter Service renamed the ship USRC Itasca. Itasca was refitted as a training vessel for the Revenue Cutter Service School of Instruction at Curtis Bay in Baltimore, Maryland. The Revenue Cutter Service commissioned her as a revenue cutter on 17 July 1907 and used her for summer training cruises for the School of Instruction Corps of Cadets. Initially home-ported at Curtis Bay, she made her first summer training cruise to Europe and the Mediterranean in 1907, also visiting Puerto Rico and the Virgin Islands. In 1909 the summer cruise included ports-of-call in Spain and Italy.

In 1910, the United States Department of War vacated Fort Trumbull near the mouth of the Thames River on Long Island Sound in New London, Connecticut, and it became the new home of the Revenue Cutter Service School of Instruction. Itasca's crew and embarked students placed as much of the school's property as could be brought on board Itasca at Curtis Bay for transportation to the new School of Instruction location in New London. When she was not being used as a training ship, Itasca was assigned relief duties for other revenue cutters on the U.S. East Coast requiring yard availability for repairs. After World War I broke out in Europe in late July 1914, cruises to Europe were suspended and the usual training cruises were interspersed with cruises that enforced the Neutrality Act of 1794 in seaports along the U.S. East Coast and in Puerto Rico.

=== Coast Guard ===
By Act of Congress on 28 January 1915 the U.S. Revenue Cutter Service merged with the United States Life-Saving Service to form the United States Coast Guard. After 28 January 1915 all cutter names prefixed with "USRC" were changed to "USCGC;" thus, USRC Itasca became USCGC Itasca.

On 6 April 1917, the day the United States entered World War I when the U.S. Congress declared war on Germany, Itasca was in the harbor at San Juan, Puerto Rico, and prevented the interned Imperial German Navy tender KD-III from being scuttled by her crew. (Note: The KD-III was the former 400 ft (120 m) British collier Farn which had been captured by the Imperial German Navy light cruiser SMS Karlsruhe. The ship was renamed KD-III, manned with a German crew and used as a tender in support of commerce raider operations. KD-III developed engine problems in January 1915 and was forced to put into San Juan harbor, where she was interned by the United States Government, at a time when the United States was neutral in World War I. The Imperial German Navy crew was allowed to live aboard and was guarded by members of the Puerto Rico National Guard.) Heroic efforts by Itasca's engineer division managed to block the sabotaged sea valves in KD-III's engine room even though the valves were under several feet of seawater. After the flooding finally was brought under control, there was 14 ft (4.3 m) of water in the after hold and 18 ft (5.5 m) in the forward hold. United States Secretary of the Navy Josephus Daniels commended the Itasca salvage team and gave the leader of the team, First Lieutenant (Eng.) Carl M. Green a special letter of commendation.

With the declaration of war, Itasca was reassigned to the Fourth Naval District headquartered at Philadelphia, Pennsylvania, and was refitted for anti-submarine service with the addition of 3-inch rapid-fire guns and a Y-gun for launching depth charges. (Note: The 28 January 1915 "Act to Create the Coast Guard" included language concerning the nature of the military service that the U.S. Coast Guard would perform. The act directed that the Coast Guard "shall constitute a part of the military forces of the United States and which shall operate under the Treasury Department in time of peace and operate as a part of the Navy, subject to orders of the Secretary of the Navy, in time of war or when the President shall so direct") Based at Cold Spring, New Jersey, she was assigned patrol duties from the southern New Jersey coast to the entrance of Delaware Bay.

After the armistice of 11 November 1918 brought World War I to an end, Itasca returned to the United States Coast Guard Academy – as the Revenue Cutter Service School of Instruction had been renamed after the 1915 creation of the Coast Guard – at New London as a training vessel, but a shortage of personnel prevented her from being manned. Her last training cruise was completed during the summer of 1920, arriving in New London on 3 October 1920.

The Coast Guard acquired a replacement training vessel, the former barkentine-rigged gunboat USS Vicksburg, from the U.S. Navy on 1 July 1921 and renamed her USCGC Alexander Hamilton on 18 August 1922. Itasca was decommissioned and sold in Baltimore, Maryland, on 11 May 1922 for US$8,250.00 to Mr. Charles A. Jording. (Note: The amount paid for Itasca by Jording included the purchase price of decommissioned USCGC Androscoggin.)

== Notes ==
=== References cited ===
- "General Order No. 1" (PDF). U.S. Coast Guard Documents & Publications. U.S. Coast Guard Historian's Office.
- "Record of Movements, Vessels of the United States Coast Guard, 1790–December 31, 1933" (PDF). Historic Documents. U.S. Coast Guard Historian's Office.
- Canney, Donald L. (1995). U.S. Coast Guard and Revenue Cutters, 1790–1935. Naval Institute Press, Annapolis, Maryland. ISBN 978-1-55750-101-1.
- Colton, Tim. "Samuel L. Moore & Sons". Shipyard Index. Shipbuildinghistory.com. Archived from the original on 2 April 2015.
- Eger, Christopher L. (March 2021). "Hudson Fulton Celebration, Part II". Warship International. LVIII (1): 58–81. ISSN 0043-0374.
- Johnson, Robert Irwin (1987). Guardians of the Sea, History of the United States Coast Guard, 1915 to the Present. Naval Institute Press, Annapolis, Maryland. ISBN 978-0-87021-720-3.
- King, Irving H. (1996). The Coast Guard Expands, 1865–1915: New Roles, New Frontiers. Naval Institute Press, Annapolis, Maryland. ISBN 978-1-55750-458-6.
- Larzelere, Alex (2003). The Coast Guard in World War I: An Untold Story. Naval Institute Press, Annapolis, Maryland. ISBN 978-1-55750-476-0.
- Mann, Raymond A. "Bancroft". Naval History and Heritage Command, Department of the Navy.
- Tilley, John. "Itasca, 1907 (Ex-USS Bancroft )" (asp). Cutters, Craft & U.S. Coast Guard-Manned Army & Navy Vessels. U.S. Coast Guard Historian's Office.
