= Canada Water Agency =

Canadian federal agency responsible for freshwater management

- Agence canadienne de l'eau

Agency overview
- Formed: 2023
- Jurisdiction: Government of Canada
- Headquarters: Winnipeg, Manitoba
- Minister responsible: Julie Dabrusin, Minister of the Environment, Climate Change and Nature
- Agency executive: Mark Fisher, President
- Website: www.canada.ca/en/canada-water-agency.html

The Canada Water Agency (French: Agence canadienne de l'eau) is an agency of the Government of Canada responsible for freshwater governance. It coordinates and administers federal programs and policies relating to the management and conservation of freshwater ecosystems.

== History ==
The establishment of a federal water agency was a part of the Liberal platform during Prime Minister Justin Trudeau's campaign for both the 2019 and 2021 elections. After the Liberals won in 2021, the initiative was included in the mandate letter to Environment Minister Steven Guilbeault. Submission of comments from interested parties followed.

The founding of the agency was officially announced by Deputy Prime Minister and Finance Minister Chrystia Freeland as part of the 2022 budget. The 2023 budget provided 85.5 million in funding to establish the agency.

The Canada Water Agency was established as a part of Environment Canada in 2023, with legislation planned later that year to elevate it to a stand-alone agency. In November 2023, legislation formally establishing the agency was tabled by Freeland as part of the 2023 Fall Economic Statement. It received royal assent on June 20, 2024.

The agency's first major actions are to implement the Freshwater Ecosystem Initiative and lead the modernization of the Canada Water Act.

== Organization and functions ==
The agency is headquartered in Winnipeg, Manitoba. It's located in the Cityplace complex, alongside Environment Canada. The Agency will also have regional offices in Vancouver, Toronto, Burlington, Quebec City, and Halifax. Like other Canadian government agencies, it is responsible to Parliament through a minister, namely the Minister of Environment and Climate Change.

The role of the agency is to assist the Minister in exercising their powers and functions relating to freshwater, particularly under the Department of the Environment Act and the Canada Water Act, and the Minister delegates their powers to the agency to this effect. The Canada Water Agency is not a law enforcement agency, nor does it directly wield any regulatory power. Instead, it focuses on coordination and funding. It also provides policy advice and expertise, an example of which is the modernization of the Canada Water Act, the agency's first major initiative.

The Agency administers several programs that fund the conservation and restoration of freshwater resources. These include EcoAction, a program that provides grants to nonprofit, non-governmental organizations for local projects that improve water quality and freshwater ecosystem health. Lake-specific restoration plans, such as the Great Lakes Freshwater Ecosystem Initiative have also been included.

== See also ==
- List of lakes of Canada
- Canadian Environmental Protection Act, 1999
