= Pollutant =

Substance or energy damaging to the environment

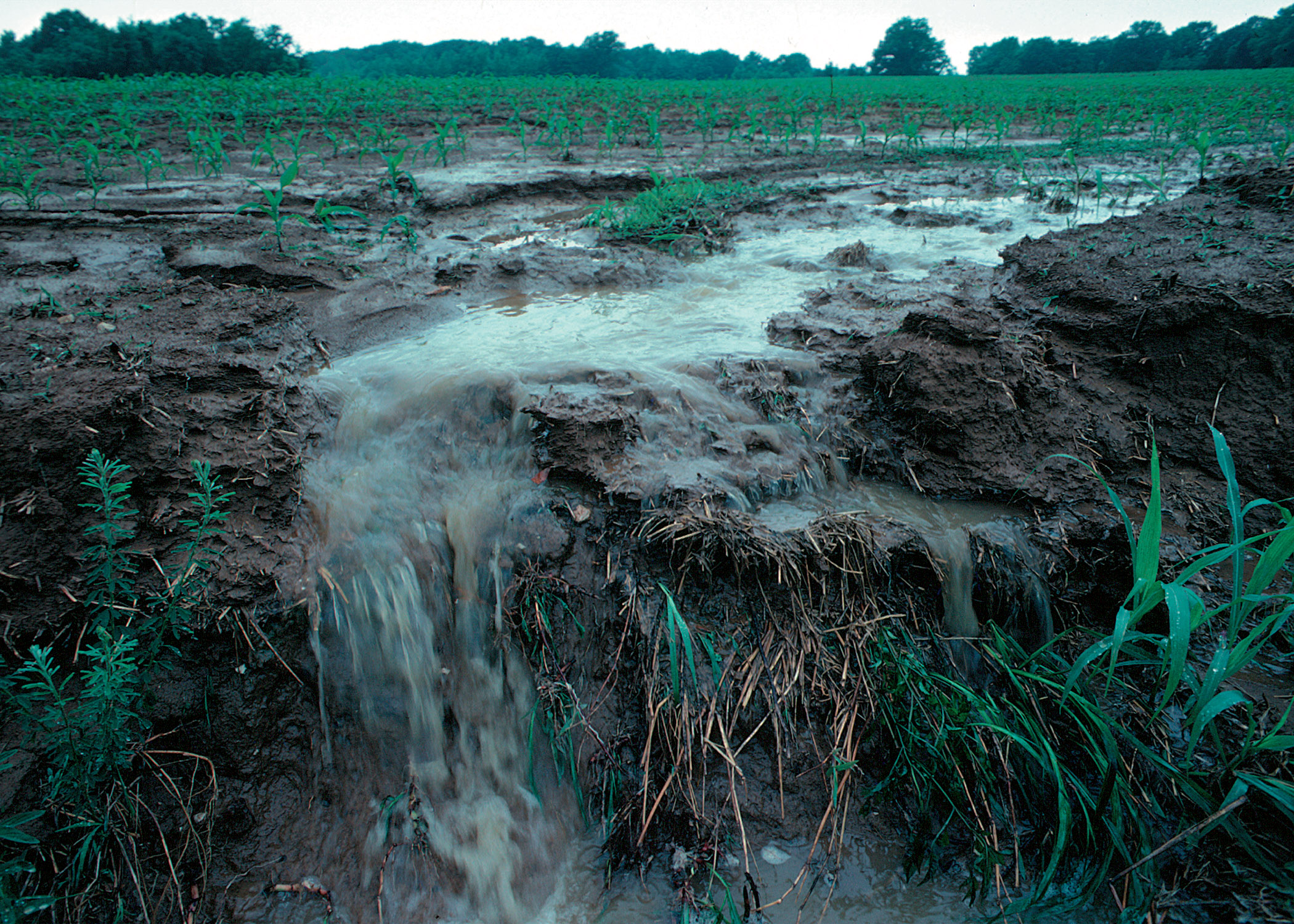
Surface runoff, also called nonpoint source pollution, from a farm field in Iowa, the United States during a rainstorm. Topsoil, as well as farm fertilizers and other potential pollutants, runoff unprotected farm fields when heavy rains occur.

A pollutant or novel entity is a substance or energy introduced into the environment that has undesired effect, or adversely affects the usefulness of a resource. These can be both naturally forming (i.e. minerals or extracted compounds like oil) or anthropogenic in origin (i.e. manufactured materials or byproducts). Pollutants result in environmental pollution or become of public health concern when they reach a concentration high enough to have significant negative impacts.

A pollutant may cause long- or short-term damage by changing the growth rate of plant or animal species, or by interfering with resources used by humans, human health or wellbeing, or property values. Some pollutants are biodegradable and therefore will not persist in the environment in a long term. However, the degradation products of some pollutants are themselves pollutants such as DDE and DDD produced from the degradation of DDT.

Pollution has widespread negative impact on the environment. When analyzed from a planetary boundaries perspective, human society has released novel entities that well exceed safe levels.

== Different types of pollutants in the environment ==
Pollutants can be categorized in a variety of different ways. For example, it is sometimes useful to distinguish between stock pollutants and fund pollutants. Another way is to group them together according to more specific properties, such as organic, particulate, pharmaceutical, et cetera. The environment has some capacity to absorb many discharges without measurable harm, and this is called “assimilative capacity (or absorptive capacity); a pollutant actually causes pollution when the assimilative capacity is exceeded.

=== Stock pollutants ===
Pollutants, towards which the environment has low absorptive capacity are called stock pollutants. Examples include persistent organic pollutants like PCBs, non-biodegradable plastics and heavy metals. Stock pollutants accumulate in the environment over time. The damage they cause increases as more pollutant is emitted, and persists as the pollutant accumulates. Stock pollutants can create a burden for the future generations, bypassing on the damage that persists well after the benefits received from incurring that damage, have been forgotten. Scientists have officially deemed that the planetary boundaries safe chemical pollutant levels (novel entities) have been surpassed.

=== Fund pollutants ===
In contrast to stock pollutants, for which the environment has low absorptive capacity, fund pollutants are those for which the environment has a moderate absorptive capacity. Fund pollutants do not cause damage to the environment unless the emission rate exceeds the receiving environment's absorptive capacity (e.g. carbon dioxide, which is absorbed by plants and oceans). Fund pollutants are not destroyed, but rather converted into less harmful substances, or diluted/dispersed to non-harmful concentrations.

=== Specific groups of pollutants ===
Many pollutants are within the following notable groups:

- Environmental persistent pharmaceutical pollutants (EPPP)
- Greenhouse gases (GHGs)
- Particulate matter (PM)
- Persistent organic pollutants (POPs)
- Polycyclic aromatic hydrocarbons (PAHs)
- Volatile organic compounds (VOCs)

=== Light pollutant ===
Light pollution is the impact that anthropogenic light has on the visibility of the night sky. It also encompasses ecological light pollution which describes the effect of artificial light on individual organisms and on the structure of ecosystems as a whole.

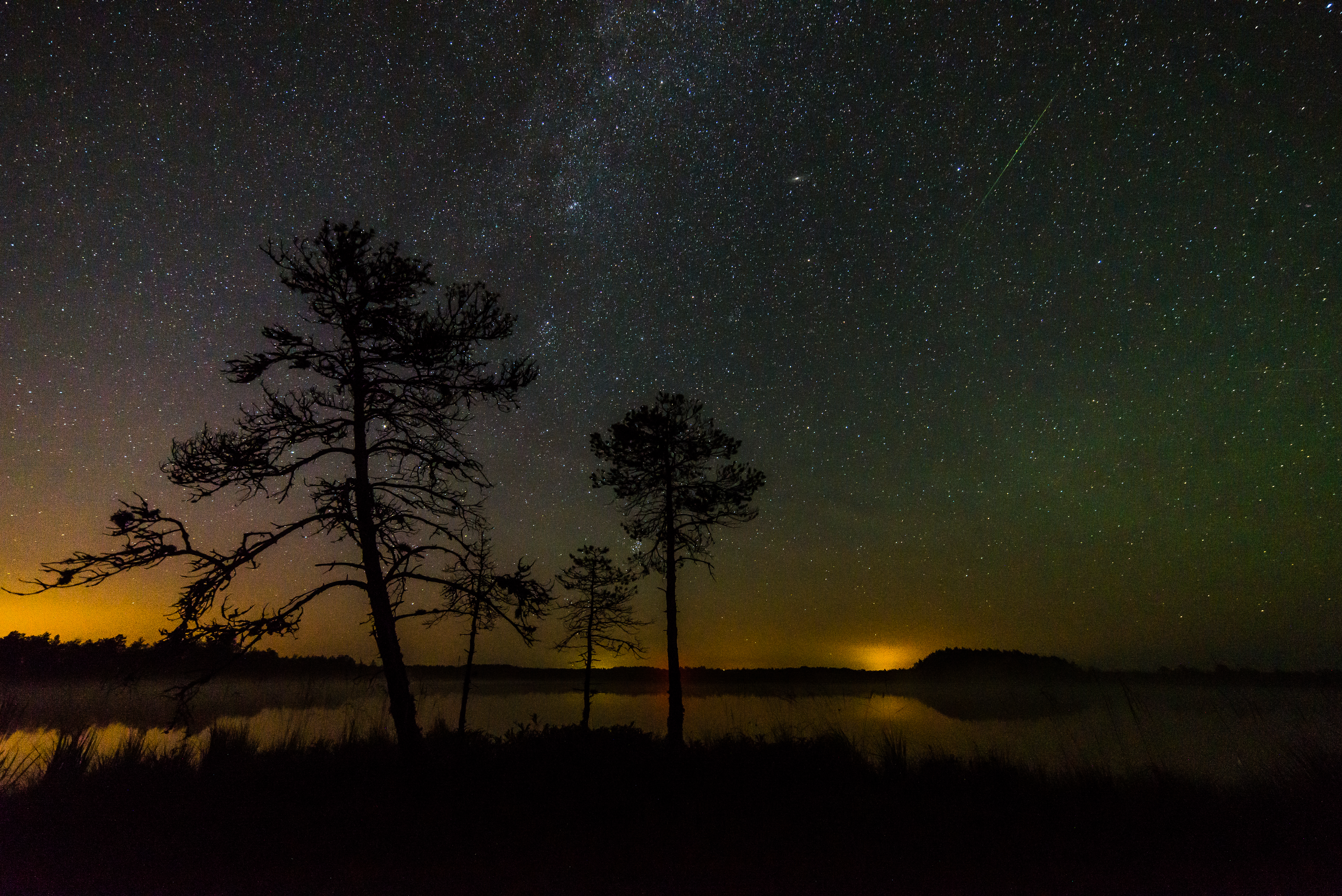
The night sky viewed from Luhasoo bog, Estonia with light pollution in the background

== Zones of influence ==
Pollutants can also be defined by their zones of influence, both horizontally and vertically.

=== Horizontal zone ===
The horizontal zone refers to the area that is damaged by a pollutant. Local pollutants cause damage near the emission source. Regional pollutants cause damage further from the emission source.

=== Vertical zone ===
The vertical zone refers to whether the damage is ground-level or atmospheric. Surface pollutants cause damage by accumulating near the Earth's surface. Global pollutants cause damage by concentrating on the [atmosphere].

== Measuring concentration ==
Measures of pollutant concentration are used to determine risk assessment in public health.

Industry is continually synthesizing new chemicals, the regulation of which requires evaluation of the potential danger for human health and the environment. Risk assessment is nowadays considered essential for making these decisions on a scientifically sound basis.

Measures or defined limits include:

- no-observed-adverse-effect level (NOAEL), also called no-effect concentration (NEC), no-observed-effect concentration (NOEC) or similarly
- lowest-observed-adverse-effect level (LOAEL)
- acceptable operator exposure level (AOEL)
- ECx (in percentage).

== Regulation ==
=== International ===
Pollutants can cross international borders and therefore international regulations are needed for their control. The Stockholm Convention on Persistent Organic Pollutants, which entered into force in 2004, is an international legally binding agreement for the control of persistent organic pollutants. Pollutant Release and Transfer Registers (PRTR) are systems to collect and disseminate information on environmental releases and transfers of toxic chemicals from industrial and other facilities.

=== European Union ===
The European Pollutant Emission Register is a type of PRTR providing access to information on the annual emissions of industrial facilities in the Member States of the European Union, as well as Norway.

=== United States ===
Clean Air Act standards. Under the Clean Air Act, the National Ambient Air Quality Standards (NAAQS) are developed by the Environmental Protection Agency (EPA) for six common air pollutants, also called "criteria pollutants": particulates; smog and ground-level ozone; carbon monoxide; sulfur oxides; nitrogen oxides; and lead. The National Emissions Standards for Hazardous Air Pollutants are additional emission standards that are set by EPA for toxic air pollutants.

Clean Water Act standards. Under the Clean Water Act, EPA promulgated national standards for municipal sewage treatment plants, also called publicly owned treatment works, in the Secondary Treatment Regulation. National standards for industrial dischargers are called Effluent guidelines (for existing sources) and New Source Performance Standards, and currently cover over 50 industrial categories. In addition, the Act requires states to publish water quality standards for individual water bodies to provide additional protection where the national standards are insufficient.

RCRA standards. The Resource Conservation and Recovery Act (RCRA) regulates the management, transport and disposal of municipal solid waste, hazardous waste and underground storage tanks.

== See also ==
- Conventional pollutant - U.S. Clean Water Act
- List of environmental issues
- Pollutant Standards Index
- Pollution
