= NPRI =

NPRI may refer to:

- National Pollutant Release Inventory
- Nevada Policy Research Institute
- Naturopathic Physicians Research Institute
