= Registro de Emisiones y Transferencia de Contaminantes =

The Registro de Emisiones y Transferencia de Contaminantes (RETC) is Mexico's Pollutant Release and Transfer Register (PRTR), similar to Canada's National Pollutant Release Inventory and the US Toxics Release Inventory.
