= R v Hydro-Québec =

- Supreme Court of Canada

Hearing: February 10, 1997 Judgment: September 18, 1997
- Full case name: Hydro-Québec v Her Majesty The Queen
- Citations: [1997] 3 S.C.R. 213
- Docket No.: 24652

Court membership
- Chief Justice: Antonio Lamer; Puisne Justices: Gérard La Forest, Claire L'Heureux-Dubé, John Sopinka, Charles Gonthier, Peter Cory, Beverley McLachlin, Frank Iacobucci, John C. Major

Reasons given
- Majority: La Forest J. (paras. 85-161), joined by L’Heureux-Dube, Gonthier, Cory, and McLachlin JJ.
- Dissent: Lamer C.J. and Iacobucci J. (paras. 1-84), joined by Sopinka and Major JJ.

R v Hydro-Québec, [1997] 3 S.C.R. 213 is a leading constitutional decision of the Supreme Court of Canada. The Court held that the Canadian Environmental Protection Act, a law for the purpose of protecting the environment, constituted criminal law and was upheld as valid federal legislation.

== Background ==
Hydro-Québec allegedly dumped polychlorinated biphenyls (PCBs) into the St. Maurice River in Quebec in the early 1990s.

== Reasons of the court ==
The majority reasons were written by Justice La Forest, and were joined by Justices L’Heureux-Dube, Gonthier, Cory, and McLachlin. La Forest began by considering which head of power had authority over the "environment". He concluded that "environment" was not a distinct subject matter that could be allocated to either the province or the federal government, rather, it is a diffuse subject that can be divided among the two governments.

La Forest considered the pith and substance of the Act. He found that the dominant feature of the Act was the "[protection] of the environment and human life and health from any and all harmful substances by regulating these substances."

La Forest then considered whether the Act constituted "criminal law", which is a federal matter under section 91(27) of the Constitution Act, 1867. He observed that criminal law must contain high level of mens rea for true crimes. Laws can be disguised (known as "colourable law") as criminal in order to intrude on provincial authority. La Forest stated that the test for "colourability" is whether the law has a "legitimate public purpose" that underlies the prohibition. He found that protection of the environment constituted such a legitimate purpose. It is a subject that has international implications yet it does not preclude the provinces from regulating in the matter along with the federal government.

La Forest rejects Hydro-Québec's argument that the Act was merely a regulatory scheme and did not constitute criminal law. He noted that the Act "is an effective means of avoiding unnecessarily broad prohibitions and carefully targeting specific toxic substances." The provisions of the Act are not directed at the general protection of the environment but rather targets to control dangerous and toxic substances. Regulations are needed because of the complexity of the subject and do not suggest a mere regulatory scheme.

== Dissent ==
A dissenting opinion was written by Chief Justice Lamer and was joined by Justices Sopinka, Iacobucci, and Major. Lamer considered the conclusions of La Forest. He agreed that the protection of the environment, in the guise of health protection, was a valid criminal law purpose, however, he disagreed that the Act was for the purpose of protecting the environment.

Lamer stated that the purpose of the Act was to regulate environmental pollution. He points to several provisions that suggest the Act is regulatory in nature. Sections 34 and 35, he notes, attempts to regulate environment and do not establish any prohibition that characterizes criminal law. The Act allows the Minister of the Environment discretion to prohibit certain substances from time to time, which Lamer finds to be a very odd way of enacting criminal law. As well, the provinces can be exempt from the Act if they have regulated their own similar law, even though provinces cannot enact criminal law.

Lamer then considered whether the law would fall under "national dimension" of the federal peace, order and good government power. To apply the law must concern a "new" subject "must have a singleness, distinctiveness and indivisibility that clearly distinguishes it from matters of provincial concern and a scale of impact on provincial jurisdiction that is reconcilable with the fundamental distribution of legislative power under the Constitution" Lamer held that the definition of "toxic substances" was too broad to meet this test. It included not just substances that would cross boundaries, but also those that would not. Consequently, the matter could be regulated by the province and would fail the "provincial inability test" from R. v. Crown Zellerbach.

== See also ==
- List of Supreme Court of Canada cases (Lamer Court)
