= Environment and Climate Change Canada =

Canadian federal government department

- Environnement et Changement climatique Canada

Department overview
- Formed: 1971; 55 years ago
- Type: Department responsible for coordinating environmental policies and programs
- Jurisdiction: Canada
- Employees: 8,571 (2023–2024)
- Annual budget: $2.4 billion (2023–2024)
- Minister responsible: Julie Dabrusin, Minister of the Environment, Climate Change and Nature
- Department executive: Mollie Johnson, Deputy Minister
- Child agencies: Meteorological Service of Canada; Parks Canada; Canadian Ice Service; Impact Assessment Agency of Canada; Water Survey of Canada; National Pollutant Release Inventory; Canada Water Agency
- Key document: Department of the Environment Act
- Website: www.canada.ca/en/environment-climate-change.html

Environment and Climate Change Canada (ECCC; French: Environnement et Changement climatique Canada) (Note: Environment and Climate Change Canada is the applied title under the Federal Identity Program; the statutory title is Department of the Environment (French: Ministère de l'Environnement).) is the department of the Government of Canada responsible for coordinating environmental policies and programs, as well as preserving and enhancing the natural environment and renewable resources. It is also colloquially known by its former name, Environment Canada (EC; French: Environnement Canada).

The minister of environment and climate change has been Julie Dabrusin since May 13, 2025; Environment and Climate Change Canada supports the minister's mandate to: "preserve and enhance the quality of the natural environment, including water, air, soil, flora and fauna; conserve Canada's renewable resources; conserve and protect Canada's water resources; forecast daily weather conditions and warnings, and provide detailed meteorological information to all of Canada; enforce rules relating to boundary waters; and coordinate environmental policies and programs for the federal government." The minister provides political direction and is responsible for the department to Parliament, with the day-to-day operations being managed by the deputy minister.

== History ==
=== Federal role ===
Under the Constitution of Canada, responsibility for environmental management in Canada is a shared responsibility between the federal government and provincial governments. For example, provincial governments have primary authority for resource management including permitting industrial waste discharges (e.g., to the air). The federal government is responsible for the management of toxic substances in the country (e.g., benzene). The department provides stewardship of the Environmental Choice Program, which provides consumers with an eco-labelling for products manufactured within Canada or services that meet international label standards of (GEN) Global Ecolabelling Network.

Under the Canadian Environmental Protection Act (CEPA 1999) (R.S., 1999, c. 33), ECCC became the lead federal department to ensure the cleanup of hazardous waste and oil spills for which the government is responsible, and to provide technical assistance to other jurisdictions and the private sector as required. The department is also responsible for international environmental issues (e.g., Canada-US air issues). CEPA was the central piece of Canada's environmental legislation but was replaced when budget implementation Bill C-38 entered into effect in June 2012.

=== Canada Water Act and creation of department ===
"Recognizing the need for better environmental management, the federal government passed the Canada Water Act in 1970 and created the Department of the Environment in 1971, entrusting the Inland Waters Directorate with providing national leadership for freshwater management. Under the Constitution Act, 1867, the provinces are "owners" of the water resources and have wide responsibilities in their day-to-day management. The federal government has certain specific responsibilities relating to water, such as fisheries and navigation, as well as exercising certain overall responsibilities such as the conduct of external affairs."

The Canada Water Act (proclaimed on September 30, 1970) provides the framework for cooperation with provinces and territories in the conservation, development, and utilization of Canada's water resources. The Canadian Environmental Protection Act, 1999, completes the framework for the protection and of water resources. Environment and Climate Change Canada is the federal department in charge of conserving and protecting Canada's water resources. The Water Act (2000), a federal legislation, "supports and promotes the conservation and management of water, including the wise allocation and use of water.". The provinces are responsible for administering the Water Act (2000). In Alberta for example, Alberta Environment and Water is responsible for administering the Water Act (2000) and the Environmental Protection and Enhancement Act (2000). Provinces environmental ministries primarily lead Water for Life (2003) programs. Provinces also implement and oversee "regulation of municipal drinking water, wastewater, and storm drainage systems."

=== Kyoto Accord and aftermath ===
The 1997 Kyoto Accord caused Minister David Anderson and the Chretien government to launch the Government of Canada Action Plan 2000 on Climate Change, which was mentioned in passing by the Governor-General in her January 30, 2000 Speech from the Throne. Despite strong objections from the governments of Saskatchewan, Alberta and Ontario and the federal Official Opposition, in securing Canadian ratification of the Kyoto Protocol in December 2002.

In 2004 Anderson was successful in getting the Species at Risk Act passed by Parliament and signed into law. Other initiatives involved improving air and water quality and established improved federal provincial cooperation on environmental issues.

In December 2011, Stephen Harper's Minister of the Environment Peter Kent announced Canada's withdrawal from the Kyoto Protocol one day after negotiators from nearly 200 countries meeting in Durban, South Africa at the 2011 United Nations Climate Change Conference (November 28 – December 11), completed a marathon of climate talks to establish a new treaty to limit carbon emissions. The Durban talks were leading to a new binding treaty with targets for all countries to take effect in 2020.

Kent argued that, "The Kyoto protocol does not cover the world's largest two emitters, the United States and China, and therefore cannot work." In 2010 Canada, Japan and Russia said they would not accept new Kyoto commitments. Canada is the only country to repudiate the Kyoto Accord. Kent argued that since Canada could not meet targets, it needed to avoid the $14 billion in penalties for not achieving its goals. This decision drew widespread international response. States for which the emissions are not covered by the Kyoto Protocol (the US and China) have the largest emissions, being responsible for 41% of the Kyoto Protocol. China's emissions increased by over 200% from 1990 to 2009 as canny industrialists moved there to avoid taxation. By 2011 the magnesium industry in Canada, which had been ranked second in 2000, had been regulated out of existence.

Harper and Jim Flaherty's 2012 federal budget's Jobs, Growth and Long-term Prosperity Act replaced the Canadian Environmental Assessment Act (CEAA 1992, 1999) with the Canadian Environmental Assessment Act, 2012. The Canadian Environmental Protection Act, Species at Risk Act, The National Energy Board Act, the Canadian Oil and Gas Operations Act, the Nuclear Safety and Control Act, the Fisheries Act (for example, closing the Experimental Lakes Area) all underwent major changes under Bill C-38 of the 41st Canadian Parliament. By placing the emphasis on jobs, growth and prosperity significant changes have been made to the federal environmental assessment regime (EA) and environmental regulatory framework.

In 2015, the newly elected Trudeau government changed the applied title of the department under the Federal Identity Program from Environment Canada to Environment and Climate Change Canada, in order to "reflect the government's priorities".

In early 2018, the government of Justin Trudeau passed the Greenhouse Gas Pollution Pricing Act (GHGPPA). In early 2019, the government of Justin Trudeau passed the Impact Assessment Act and Canadian Energy Regulator Acts (IAA and CERA) under minister Catherine McKenna.

On March 25, 2021, the Supreme Court of Canada rejected the 2019 appeal of the provinces of Alberta, Ontario, and Saskatchewan and ruled in Reference re Greenhouse Gas Pollution Pricing Act that the GHGPPA was constitutional.

On April 6, 2022, Equinor's project on the Bay du Nord property was approved under Section 54 of the Canadian Environmental Assessment Act, 2012 by the federal cabinet and Minister Guilbeault. The CEAA was used because the assessment was initiated before that law was voided by the IAA.

== Operations ==
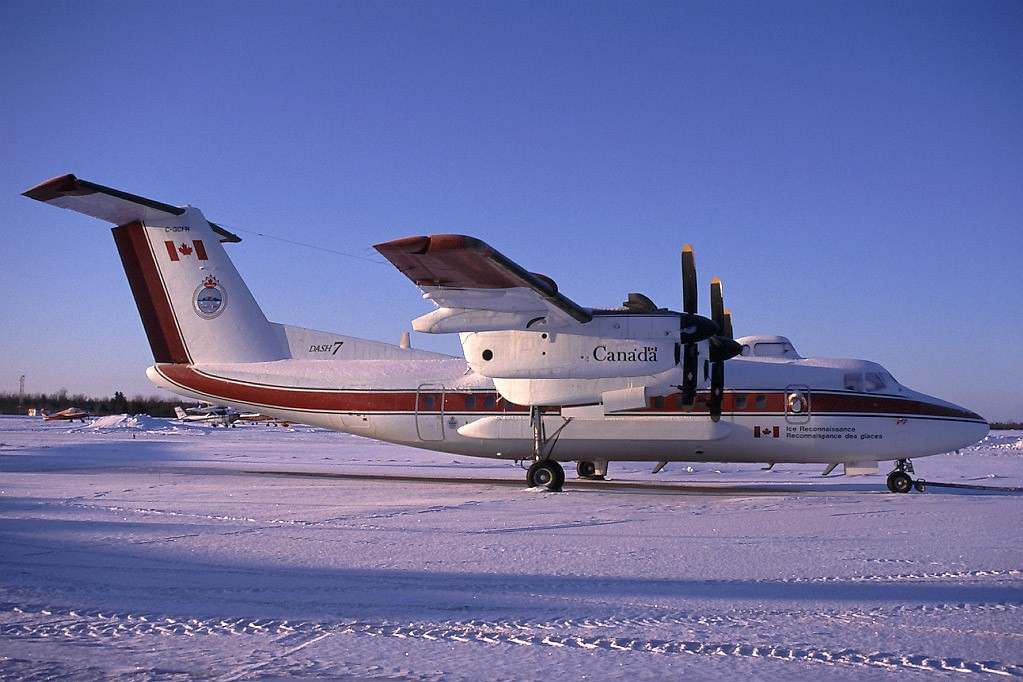
Ice Reconnaissance de Havilland Canada Dash 7 at Carp Airport

The department is divided into several geographic regions:

- National Capital
- Atlantic and Quebec Region (Atlantic Canada, Maritimes, Newfoundland and Labrador and Quebec)
- Ontario
- West and North (Yukon, Nunavut, Northwest Territories, British Columbia, and Prairies)

The department has several organizations which carry out specific tasks:

- Enforcement Branch
  - Environmental Enforcement
  - Wildlife Enforcement
- Environmental Protection Branch
  - Canadian Wildlife Service
  - Chemical Sectors
  - Energy and Transportation
  - Environmental Protection Operations
  - Legislative and Regulatory Affairs
  - Strategic Priorities
- Meteorological Service of Canada (for weather forecasting; climate, air quality and water monitoring)
  - Weather and environmental monitoring (Climate Monitoring, Water Survey of Canada)

=== Weather and Environmental Operations (Regional Weather Operations) ===
  - Weather and Environmental Prediction and Services (Defence Weather Services, Marine and Ice Services (Canadian Ice Service)
  - Canadian Hurricane Centre
- Science and Technology Branch
  - Atmospheric and Climate Science
  - Water Science and Technology Directorate (including the National Water Research Institute)
  - National Pollutant Release Inventory
  - Wildlife and Landscape Science
  - Air Quality Mobile Source Emissions Measurement and Research

=== Agencies ===
The Impact Assessment Agency of Canada is an arms-length agency that reports to the Minister of Environment and Climate Change.

Parks Canada, which manages the Canadian National Parks system, was removed from Environment Canada and became an agency reporting to the minister of Canadian heritage in 1998. In 2003, responsibility for Parks Canada was returned to the minister of the environment's portfolio.

=== Enforcement activities ===

The Enforcement Branch is responsible for ensuring compliance with several federal statutes. Enforcement officers are appointed pursuant to section 217(3) of the Canadian Environmental Protection Act, having all the powers of peace officers.

There are two designations of enforcement officers: Environmental Enforcement and Wildlife Enforcement. The former administers the Canadian Environmental Protection Act and pollution provisions of the Fisheries Act and corresponding regulations. The latter enforces Migratory Birds Convention Act, Canada Wildlife Act, Species at Risk Act and The Wild Animal and Plant Protection and Regulation of International and Interprovincial Trade Act. All officers wear dark green uniform with black ties and a badge (appear on the right). Environmental Enforcement Officers only carry baton and OC spray whereas Wildlife Enforcement Officers are also equipped with firearm.

The minister may also appoint members of the Royal Canadian Mounted Police, fishery officers, parks officers, customs officers and conservation officers of provincial and territorial governments as enforcement officers and to allow them to exercise the powers of Department of Environment officers.

==== Electronic waste ====
The Export and Import of Hazardous Waste and Hazardous Recyclable Material Regulations (EIHWHRMR) operates with a few basic premises, one of which being that electronic waste is either "intact" or "not intact". The various annexes define hazardous waste in Canada, and also deem any waste that is "...considered or defined as hazardous under the legislation of the country receiving it and is prohibited by that country from being imported or conveyed in transit" to be covered under Canadian regulation and therefore subject to prior informed consent procedures.

Since Canada ratified the Basel Convention on August 28, 1992, and as of August 2011, the Enforcement Branch has initiated 176 investigations for violations under EIHWHRMR, some of which are still in progress. There have been 19 prosecutions undertaken for non-compliance with the provisions of the EIHWHRMR some of which are still before the courts.

== Notable related legislation ==
The department administers and assists in the administration of nearly c. 24 acts through regulations and through "voluntary and regulated agreements with individuals or multiple parties in Canada and elsewhere to define mutual commitments, roles and responsibilities and actions on specific environmental issues."

=== Canada National Parks Act ===
The Canada National Parks Act governs Parks Canada Agency.

=== Canada Wildlife Act ===
Canada Wildlife Act (R.S.C., 1985, c. W-9) Amended in June 2012 by Bill C-38 'allows for the creation, management and protection of wildlife areas' to preserve habitats, particularly for at risk species and requires permits for specified activities in designated wildlife areas.

=== Impact Assessment Act (2019) ===
The Environmental Protection and Enhancement Act (2000) "supports and promotes the protection, enhancement, and wise use of the environment. The Act's individual regulations cover a wide range of activities, from beverage container recycling and pesticide sales, potable water, to wastewater and storm drainage."

=== Migratory Birds Convention Act ===
First enacted in 1917, the Migratory Birds Convention Act protects most species of birds in Canada through regulations surrounding hunting, culling, and scientific research.

== Publications album ==
Volume I of the Climate Report, published in 1964

Volume II of the Climate Report, published in 1964

Volume III of the Climate Report, published in 1964

Volume IV of the Climate Report, published in 1964

Volume V of the Climate Report, published in 1964

Volume I of the Climate Report, published in 1973

Volume II of the Climate Report, published in 1973

== See also ==
- Environment of Canada
- Accelerated Reduction/Elimination of Toxics
- Alberta Hail Project
- North American Game Warden Museum
- Ernie Cooper
- New Brunswick Environmental and Heritage Acts
- Weatheradio Canada

== Additional reading ==
- "Canadian Wildlife Service homepage", Canadian Wildlife Service, 2002–2010, archived from the original on April 15, 2013
- "Canadian Wildlife Service homepage", Canadian Wildlife Service, 2002–2010, archived from the original on February 9, 2010
- "About Environment Canada", Environment Canada, November 17, 2013
- "Water Policy", waterpolicy.ca, n.d., archived from the original on March 4, 2016
- In 2019, ECCC released a report called Canada's Changing Climate Report (CCCR). It is essentially a summary of the IPCC 5th Assessment Report, customized for Canada. The report states that coastal flooding is expected to increase in many areas due to global sea-level rise and local land subsidence or uplift.
