= Water Survey of Canada =

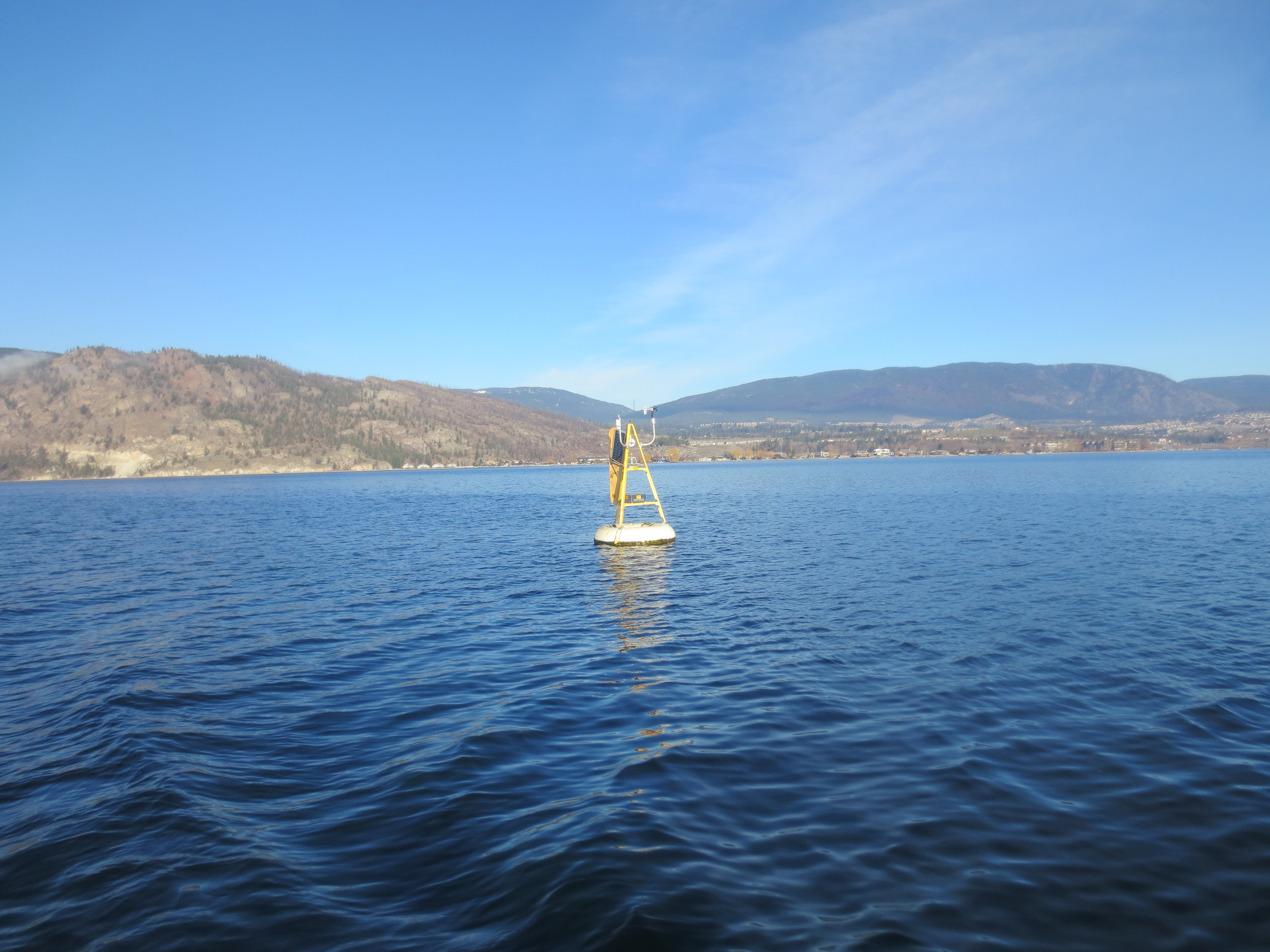
Environment Canada Lake Evaporation Monitoring Buoy in Lake Okanagan

The Water Survey of Canada (WSC) is a scientific branch of Environment and Climate Change Canada, responsible for monitoring the nation's freshwater resources.

The WSC maintains Canada's hydrometric data network, widely referred to as HYDAT. Previously over 2,500 hydrometric gauges were maintained. Currently fewer than 2000 stations provide active data. Stations or gauges record lake and river water levels that are used to compute river flow data.

Datasets developed by the WSC are used for water-resource management purposes in various policy programs by federal, provincial and municipal governments. This information is also available free to the public by searching Archived Hydrometric Data. These datasets also contribute to ongoing efforts to measure the local, regional and national impacts of climate change.

== See also ==
- Canadian Hydrographic Service
