= Canadian Ice Service =

Division of the Meteorological Service of Canada

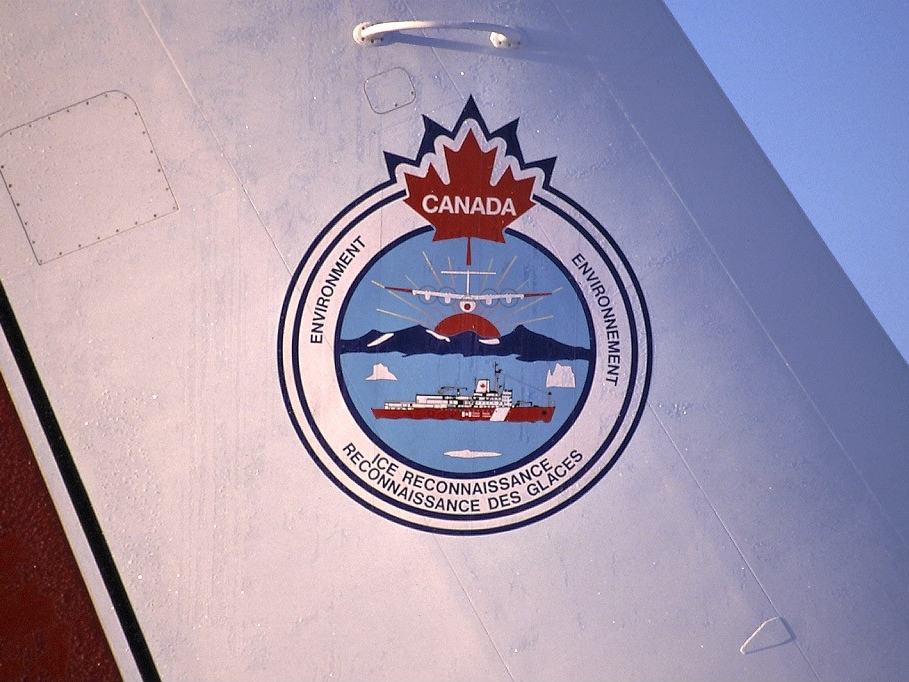

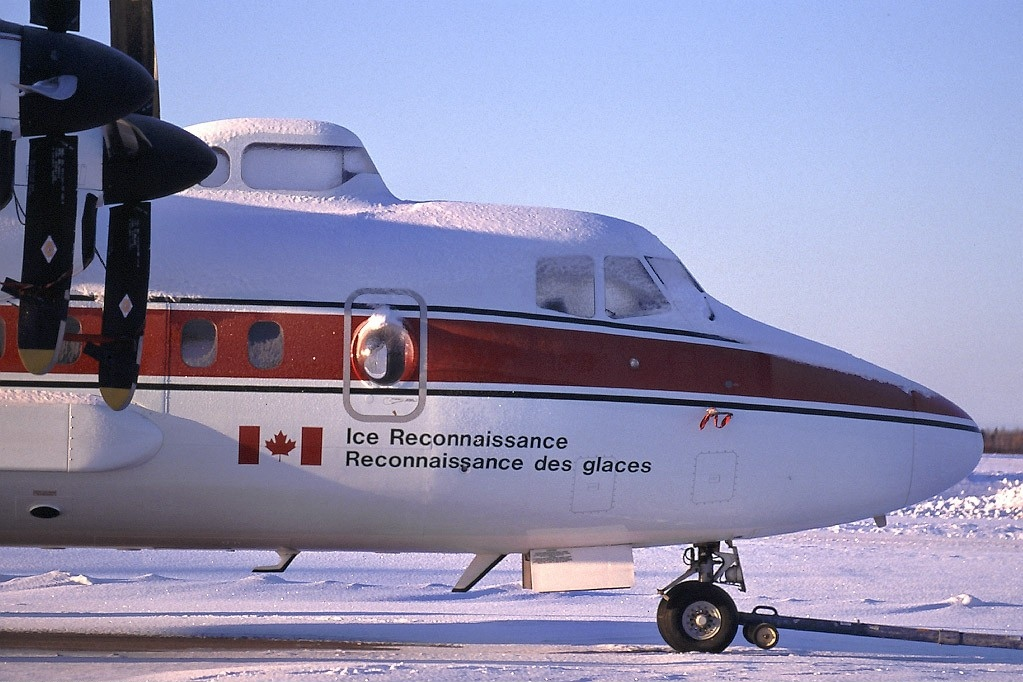
- Types: branch
- Headquarters: Ottawa
- Country: Canada
- Parent organisations: Meteorological Service of Canada
- Website: ice-glaces.ec.gc.ca

The Canadian Ice Service (CIS) is a division of the Meteorological Service of Canada (MSC), which is a branch of Canada's Department of the Environment and Climate Change. The CIS is the leading authority for information about ice in Canada's navigable waters. Ice affects marine transportation in Canada's heartland as well as in the North, commercial fishing, offshore resource development, the hunting and fishing patterns of aboriginal peoples, tourism and recreation, and local weather patterns and long-term climate.

== Mandate ==
The mission of the CIS is to provide the most timely and accurate information possible about ice in Canada's navigable waters. In support of this, its two main objectives are to ensure the safety of Canadians, their property and their environment by warning them of hazardous ice conditions in navigable Canadian waters, and to provide present and future generations of Canadians with sufficient knowledge about their ice environment in order to support sound environmental policies.

== Organization ==
The CIS has approximately 60 employees at its headquarters in Ottawa, Ontario.

== See also ==
- International Ice Patrol
- National Ice Center
