= International Ice Patrol =

Organization monitoring icebergs in the Atlantic and Arctic

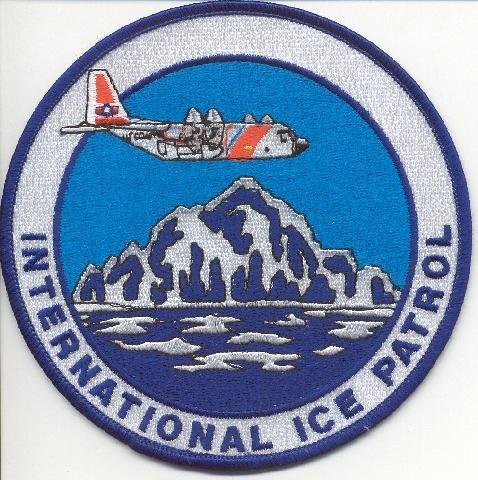
- Active: 1914–present
- Country: United States
- Branch: United States Coast Guard
- Type: Search and rescue
- Website: International Ice Patrol

Aircraft flown
- Patrol: Lockheed C-130 Hercules

The International Ice Patrol is an organization with the purpose of monitoring the presence of icebergs in the Atlantic and Arctic oceans and reporting their movements for safety purposes. It is operated by United States Coast Guard but is funded by the 13 nations interested in trans-Atlantic navigation. As of 2011 the governments contributing to the International Ice Patrol include Belgium, Canada (see Canadian Ice Service), Denmark, Finland, France, Germany, Greece, Italy, Japan, the Netherlands, Norway, Panama, Poland, Spain, Sweden, the United Kingdom, and the United States.

The organization was established in 1914 in response to the sinking of RMS Titanic. The primary mission of the Ice Patrol is to monitor the iceberg danger in the North Atlantic Ocean and provide relevant iceberg warning products to the maritime community.

== History ==
=== Founding ===
From the earliest journeys into the North Atlantic, icebergs have threatened vessels. A review of the history of navigation prior to the turn of the 20th century shows an impressive number of casualties occurred in the vicinity of the Grand Banks of Newfoundland. For example, Lady of the Lake sank in 1833 with a loss of 215 people. Between 1882 and 1890, 14 vessels were lost and 40 seriously damaged due to ice. This does not include the large number of whaling and fishing vessels lost or damaged by ice. It took one of the greatest marine disasters of all time to arouse public demand for international cooperative action to deal with this marine hazard. This disaster, the sinking of RMS Titanic on 15 April 1912, was the prime impetus for the establishment of the International Ice Patrol.

On her maiden voyage from Southampton, England, bound for New York, Titanic collided with an iceberg just south of the tail of the Grand Banks and sank in less than three hours. The loss of life was enormous with more than 1,500 of the 2,224 passengers and crew perishing. Titanic, the brand new flagship of the White Star Line, was the largest passenger liner of her time displacing over 46,000 tons and capable of sustained speed in excess of 22 knots (41 km/h). The loss of Titanic gripped the world with a sobering awareness of an iceberg's potential for tragedy. The sheer dimensions of the Titanic disaster created sufficient public reaction on both sides of the Atlantic to prod reluctant governments into action, producing the first Safety of Life at Sea (SOLAS) convention in 1914.

After the Titanic disaster, the U.S. Navy assigned the cruisers USS Chester and USS Birmingham to patrol the Grand Banks of Newfoundland for the remainder of 1912. In 1913, the United States Navy could not spare ships for this purpose, so the Revenue Cutter Service (forerunner of the United States Coast Guard) assumed responsibility, assigning USRC Seneca and USRC Miami to conduct the patrol.

At the first International Conference on the Safety of Life at Sea, which was convened in London on 12 November 1913, the subject of patrolling the ice regions was thoroughly discussed. The convention signed on 30 January 1914, by the representatives of the world's various maritime powers, provided for the inauguration of an international derelict-destruction, ice observation, and ice patrol service, consisting of vessels, which should patrol the ice regions during the season of iceberg danger and attempt to keep the trans-Atlantic lanes clear of derelicts during the remainder of the year. Due primarily to the experience gained in 1912 and 1913, the United States Government was invited to undertake the management of the triple service, the expense to be defrayed by the 13 nations interested in trans-Atlantic navigation.

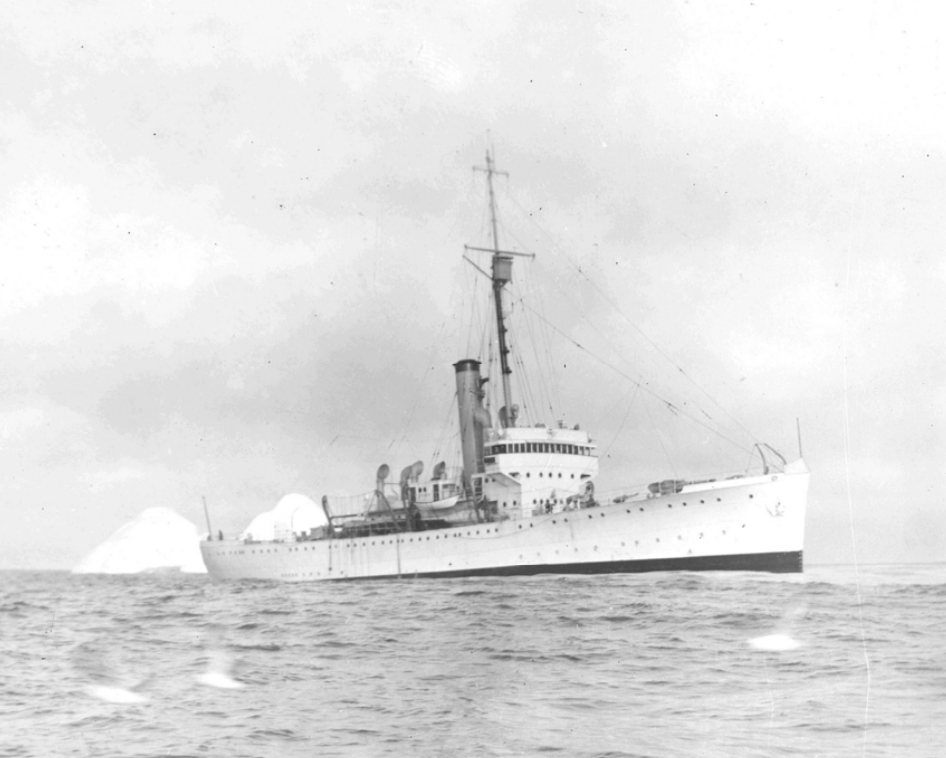
USCGC Champlain on patrol in the mid-1930s

The second International Conference on Safety of Life at Sea was convened in London on 16 April 1929. Eighteen nations participated, all of which signed the final act on 31 May 1929. Because of the fear in the United States Senate as a result of ambiguities in Article 54 dealing with control, the 1929 convention was not ratified by the United States until 7 August 1936, and even then the ratification was accompanied by three reservations. At the same time, Congress enacted legislation on 25 June 1936, formally requiring the commandant of the Coast Guard to administer the International Ice Observation and Ice Patrol Service (Chap. 807, para. 2 49 USC 1922) and describing in general fashion the manner in which this service was to be performed. With only minor changes, this remains today as the basic Coast Guard authority to operate the International Ice Patrol. Since 1929, there have been three SOLAS conventions (1948, 1960 & 1974). None of these have recommended any basic change affecting the Ice Patrol.

Every year since 1914, the United States Coast Guard and the International Ice Patrol lay a wreath from a ship or an aircraft at the site of the Titanic disaster on 15 April. The solemn ceremony is attended by the craft's crew and a dedication statement to the Titanic and her fatalities is read.

== Administration ==
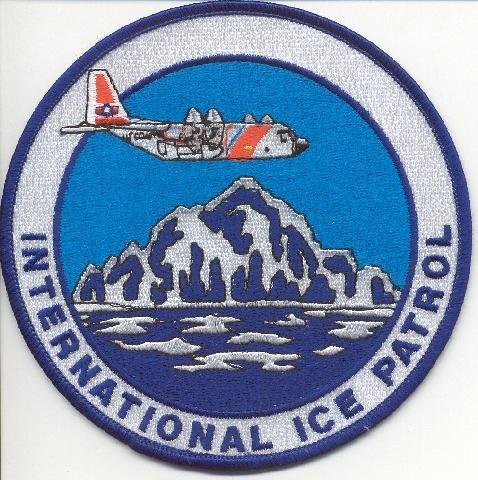
International Ice Patrol patch

From its inception until the beginning of World War II, the Ice Patrol was conducted from two surface patrol cutters alternating surveillance patrols of the southern ice limits. In 1931 and thereafter a third ship was assigned to Ice Patrol to perform oceanographic observations in the vicinity of the Grand Banks. After World War II, aerial surveillance became the primary ice reconnaissance method with surface patrols phased out except during unusually heavy ice years or extended periods of reduced visibility. Use of the oceanographic vessel continued until 1982, when the Coast Guard's sole remaining oceanographic ship, USCGC Evergreen, was converted to a medium endurance cutter. The aircraft has distinct advantages for ice reconnaissance providing much greater coverage in a relatively short period of time.

From 1946 until 1966, the Ice Patrol offices, operations center and reconnaissance aircraft were based at the Coast Guard Air Detachment Argentia, Newfoundland during the ice season.

Due to changing operational commitments and financial constraints the Coast Guard Argentia Air Detachment closed in 1966. Ice Patrol headquarters and operations center moved to Governors Island, New York, where they remained until October 1983.

Today the International Ice Patrol is located at the NOAA Satellite Operations Facility in Suitland, Maryland. Previously, it was located at the Coast Guard Research and Development Center in New London, Connecticut. The ice reconnaissance detachment, usually composed of eleven aircrew and four ice observers flying in an HC-130 aircraft, continues to work out of Newfoundland.

The Ice Patrol disseminates information on icebergs and the limit of all known sea ice via radio broadcast from the U.S. Coast Guard Communications Command (COMMCOM) located in Chesapeake, Virginia, via Inmarsat Safetynet, and radio facsimile chart. Ice Patrol information is also available via internet access. 2002 changes to SOLAS requires ships transiting the region guarded by the Ice Patrol to use the services provided during the ice season.

== Aviation history of the International Ice Patrol ==
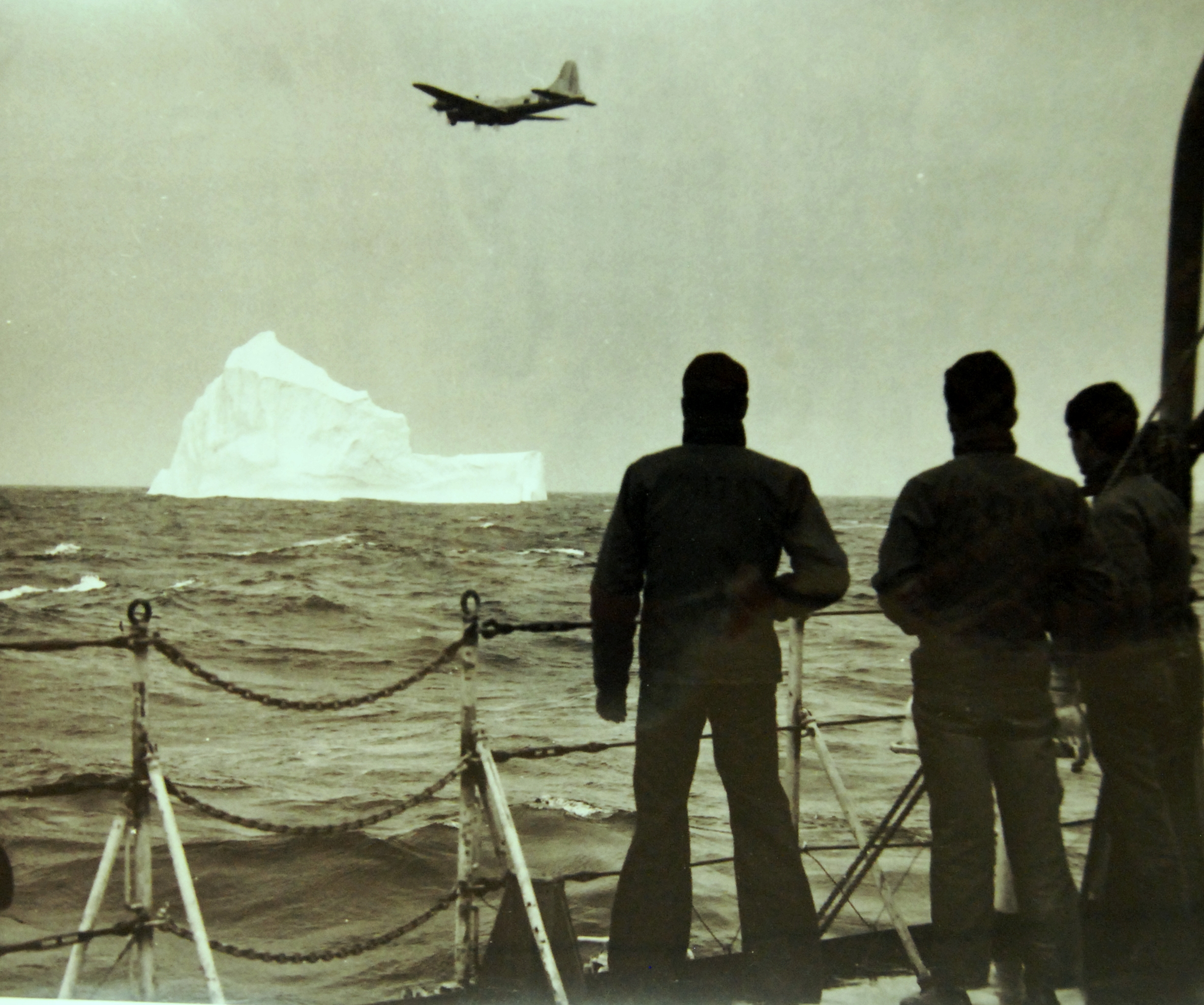
A PB-1G on patrol in 1948, seen from USCGC Mendota (WHEC-69)

- 6 February 1946 – A PBY-5A makes the first International Ice Patrol reconnaissance flight.
- 24 February 1946 – Two PB4Y-1s arrive at Naval Station Argentia in Argentia, Newfoundland to become the first dedicated Ice Patrol aircraft.
- 1 July 1946 – First helicopter deployments in International Ice Patrol. An HNS-1 helicopter, Sikorsky R-4, CGNR 39047, flew from USCGC Northwind off the Greenland coast.
- 1947 – A PB-1G becomes the Ice Patrol aircraft.
- 1948 – Camera-equipped PB-1G begins an iceberg census off Baffin Island completed in 1949.
- 1949 – Aircraft become the sole reconnaissance tools for the first time.
- 1956 – Unsuccessful tests to identify icebergs by marking with dye markers, commercial dye, and used motor oil.
- 1958 – Last ice patrol by a PB-1G.
- 1959 – R5Ds replace PB-1Gs.
- June 1959 – Unsuccessful iceberg demolition experiments with magnesium and thermite incendiary bombs.
- May 1960 – Unsuccessful iceberg demolition experiments dropping high-explosive bombs from UF-2G.
- 24 May 1962 – First Ice Patrol by HC-130B.
- 1963 – R5Ds replaced by Doppler Navigation System equipped HC-130Bs.
- 1964 – First successful use of Airborne radiation thermometer to detect changes in surface water temperature.
- 1967 – First use of microwave radiometer to differentiate radar contacts as ship or iceberg.
- 30 April 1970 – The ice reconnaissance detachment moved from Argentia to CFB Summerside in Prince Edward Island.
- 1971 – Side-looking airborne radar (SLAR) evaluation began.
- 1973 – Inertial Navigation System installed on Ice Patrol aircraft.
- 1973 – The ice reconnaissance detachment moved to St. John's International Airport, St. John's, Newfoundland.
- 1982 – The ice reconnaissance detachment relocated to CFB Gander, Gander, Newfoundland.
- 1989 – The ice reconnaissance detachment moved back to St. John's, Newfoundland.
