= USCGC Evergreen =

American seagoing buoy tender (1943–1990)

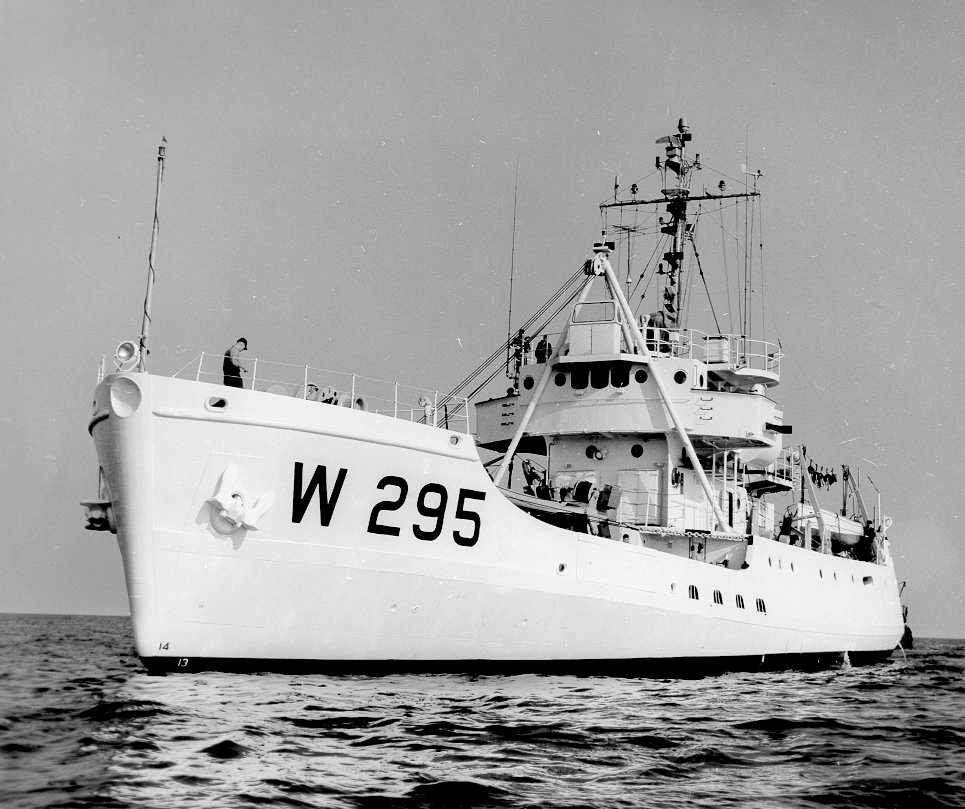
- USCGC Evergreen as an oceanographic vessel

History

United States
- Builder: Marine Ironworks & Shipbuilding Corporation, Duluth, Minnesota
- Cost: $871,946
- Laid down: 15 April 1942
- Launched: 3 July 1942
- Commissioned: 30 April 1943
- Decommissioned: 26 June 1990
- Identification: Signal Letters NRXD; IMO number: 7738577
- Nickname(s): Never Clean; Ever Gone
- Fate: Sunk as target ship, 1992

General characteristics as built in 1942
- Class & type: Cactus class buoy tender
- Displacement: 935 long tons (950 t)
- Length: 180 ft (55 m)
- Beam: 37 ft (11 m)
- Propulsion: 2 × Westinghouse generators driven by 2 Cooper-Bessemer GND-8 8-cylinder 4-cycle 6352 cubic inch diesel engines
- Speed: 13 kn (24 km/h; 15 mph)
- Range: 8,000 nmi (15,000 km; 9,200 mi) at 13 kn (24 km/h; 15 mph)
- Complement: 6 officers, 74 enlisted
- Armament: 20-mm guns, a 3-inch cannon, and depth charges

The USCGC Evergreen (WAGL-295 / WLB-295 / WAGO-295 / WMEC-295) was a Cactus-class seagoing buoy tender operated by the United States Coast Guard. She served in the North Atlantic during World War II and participated in the International Ice Patrol in these waters after the war. She was the first dedicated oceanographic vessel in the Coast Guard's history. She was decommissioned in 1990 and sunk by the US Navy for target practice in 1992.

== Construction and characteristics ==
Evergreen was built at the Marine Ironworks and Shipbuilding Company yard in Duluth, Minnesota. Her keel was laid down on 15 April 1942. The ship was launched on 3 July 1942. Her original cost was $871,946.

Her hull was constructed of welded steel plates framed with steel I-beams. As originally built, Evergreen was 180 feet (55 m) long, with a beam of 37 feet (11 m), and a draft of 12 feet (3.7 m). Her displacement was 935 tons. While her overall dimensions remained the same over her career, the addition of new equipment raised her displacement to 1,025 tons by the end of her Coast Guard service.

She was designed to perform light ice-breaking. Her hull was reinforced with an "ice belt" of thicker steel around her waterline to protect it from punctures. Similarly, her bow was reinforced and shaped to ride over ice in order to crush it with the weight of the ship.

Evergreen had a single 8.5 feet (2.6 m) stainless-steel five-blade propeller driven by a diesel-electric propulsion system. Two Cooper-Bessemer GND-8 4-cycle 8-cylinder Diesel engines produced 700 horsepower each. They provided power to two Westinghouse generators. The electricity from the generators ran a 1200-horsepower Westinghouse electric motor which turned the propeller.

She had a single cargo boom which had the ability to lift 20 tons onto her buoy deck.

The ship's fuel tanks had a capacity of approximately 30,000 US gallons (110,000 L). Evergreen's unrefueled range was 8,000 nautical miles (15,000 km) at 13 knots, 12,000 nautical miles (22,000 km) at 12 knots, and 17,000 nautical miles (31,000 km) at 8.3 knots. Her potable water tanks had a capacity of 30,499 US gallons (115,450 L). Considering dry storage capacity and other factors, her at-sea endurance was 21 days.

Her wartime complement was 6 officers and 74 enlisted men. By 1964 this was reduced to 5 officers, 2 warrant officers, and 42 enlisted personnel.

Evergreen was armed with a 3"/50 caliber gun mounted behind the pilot house. She also had two 20mm guns, one mounted on top of the wheelhouse and one on the aft deck. Two racks of depth charges were also mounted on the aft deck. She also was equipped with mousetrap anti-submarine rockets. All of this armament was removed in 1966 leaving Evergreen with only small arms for law enforcement actions.

At the time of construction, Evergreen was designated WAGL, an auxiliary vessel, lighthouse tender. Her namesake was the evergreen tree, in conformance with the Coast Guard tradition of naming buoy tenders after trees and shrubs.

== World War II service (1942–1945) ==
Evergreen began her World War II service with brief postings in the Great Lakes and Charleston, South Carolina. She was then home-ported in Boston, where she spent the remainder of the war. Her primary mission was weather patrol in the North Atlantic. Between August 1943 and July 1944 she sailed from Boston, Portland, or Agentia out to designated points in the ocean to take weather readings which were radioed back to shore. These trips typically lasted about three weeks. This timely, mid-ocean weather data allowed military planners to route aircraft directly from the United States to England, saving the long delay in shipping aircraft by freighter. She rotated on these weather patrols With USCGC Sorrel and USCGC Conifer.

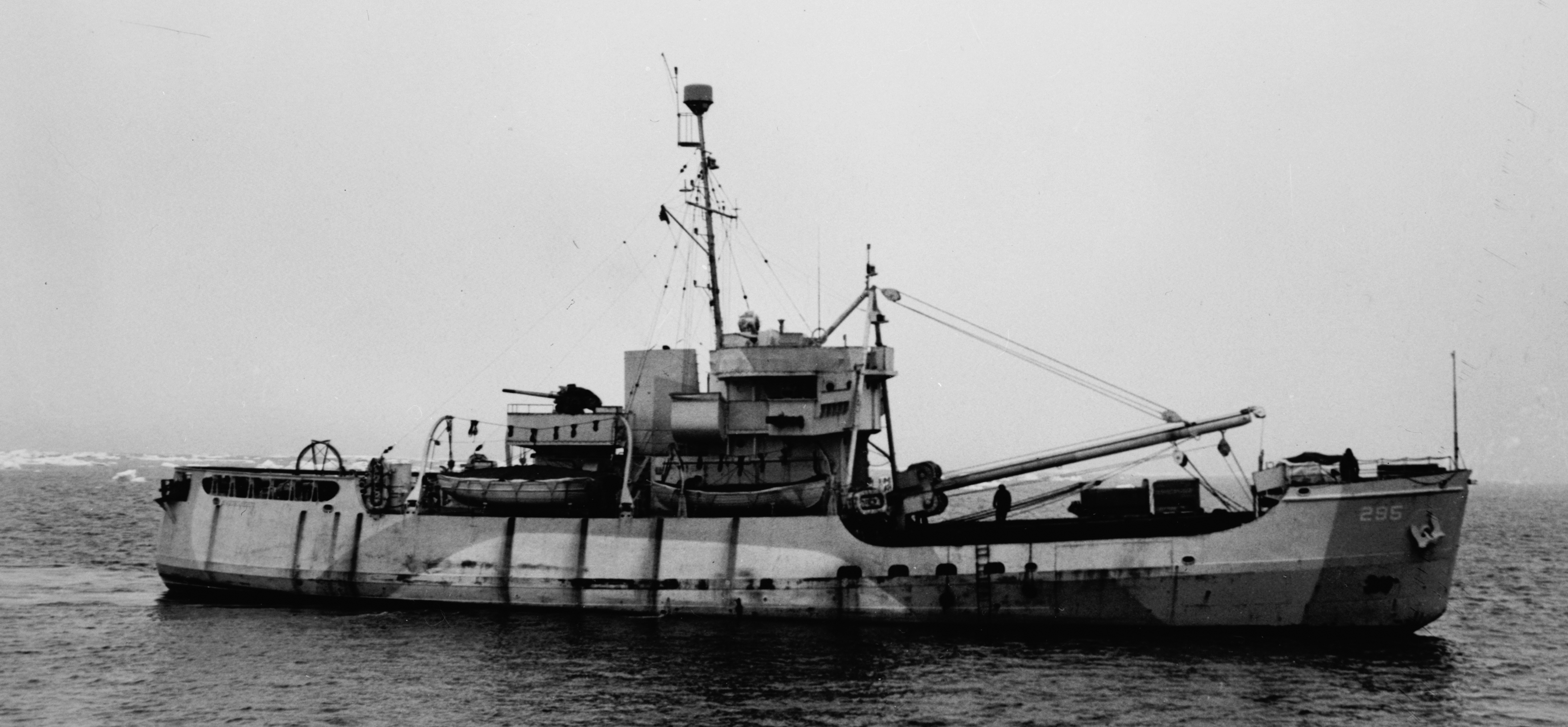
Evergreen in the North Atlantic during World War II

On 26 July 1944 she departed Argentia, escorting two merchant ships to Greenland. On 31 July she made a sonar contact and fired 16 anti-submarine projectiles at what was later concluded to be either whales or a cold water layer in the ocean. She arrived at Narsarssuaq on 1 August 1944. She patrolled up the east coast of Greenland to Cape Pansch, and supplied remote military bases including radio direction finding stations attempting to localize German U-boats and German weather stations in Greenland. On 19 November 1944 Evergreen landed a party of 27 soldiers on the east coast of Greenland to investigate possible enemy activity. She broke channels through the ice to allow other ships to reach port on several occasions.

Evergreen sailed to the United States for repairs at the Portsmouth Navy Yard in February 1945, but returned to Greenland in April 1945. She continued her work supplying remote bases, icebreaking, and building and maintaining aids to navigation. As World War II ended in Europe, her work went into reverse. She evacuated men from their remote bases. On 28 September 1945 she completed the evacuation of Cape Dan.

== Post-war service (1945–1964) ==
After the war Evergreen remained based at Boston. She serviced remote LORAN stations in the North Atlantic and was involved in a number of search and rescue missions. In August 1947 she towed the disabled 90-foot fishing boat Dartmouth 450 miles back to Gloucester. In September 1947 she took in tow the disabled Army transport Flemish Bend off Newfoundland. A celebrity rescue took place in September 1953, when Evergreen rescued Malcolm Forbes, publisher of Forbes Magazine, when his yacht broke down in the path of an advancing hurricane.

On 25 July 1956 the Italian liner Andrea Doria, with 1706 passengers and crew aboard, collided with the liner Stockholm off Nantucket and began to sink. Andrea Doria had 1,706 passengers and crew aboard. Evergreen, returning to Boston from ice patrol, was diverted to the scene. She arrived at 8:06 am on 26 July 1956 and took command of the rescue effort. By that time there was little she could do. She radioed, "S.S. Andrea Doria sank in 225 feet of water at 10:09 A.M." After the sinking, Evergreen searched an 80-square mile area around the wreck for 40 people that had not been accounted for. She found none. She was joined by USCGC Yakutat and USCGC Fredrick Lee in recovering floating debris from the site. The Coast Guard ended this effort on 30 July.

In April 1948 Evergreen was the first buoy tender assigned to the International Ice Patrol. In this mission she would sail into the North Atlantic during the spring thaw. While off the coasts of Newfoundland, Labrador, and Greenland, she would assess conditions that could carry dangerous icebergs into shipping lanes. This was the first off a decades-long series of ice patrol cruises. While on these patrols crewmen and visiting scientists sampled water temperatures using Nansen bottles, and currents using a geomagnetic electrokinetograph. She deployed a deep-sea buoy to collect oceanographic data. Between 1948 and 1986 Evergreen was on ice patrol at least thirty-four times.

== Oceanographic vessel (1964–1982) ==
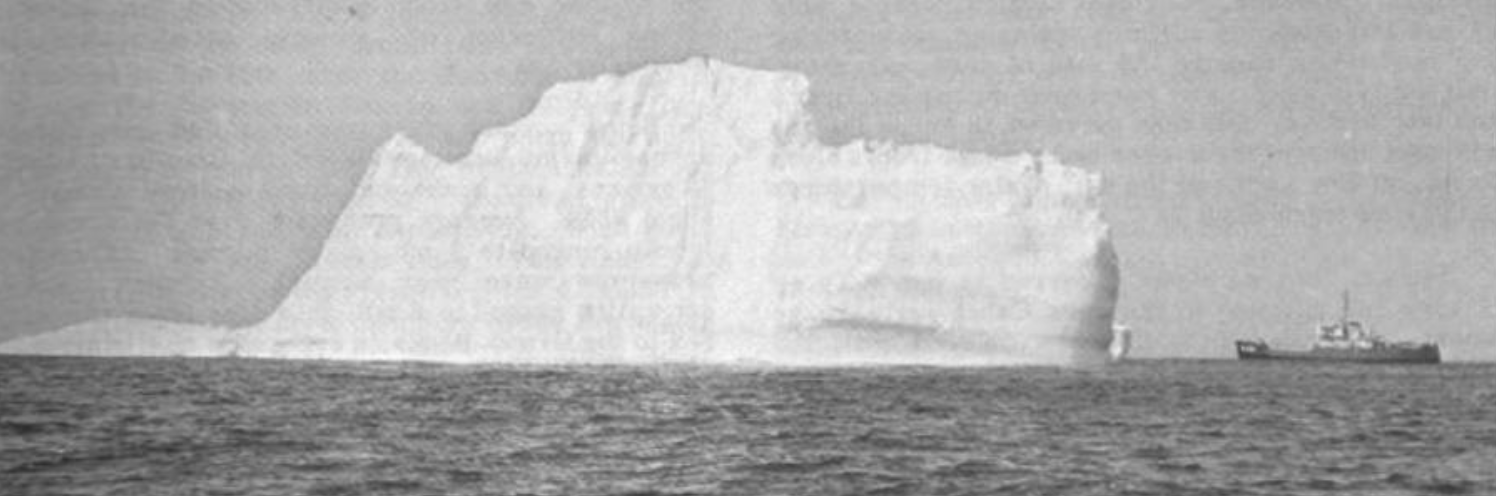
USCGC Evergreen with iceberg during the 1965 International Ice Patrol

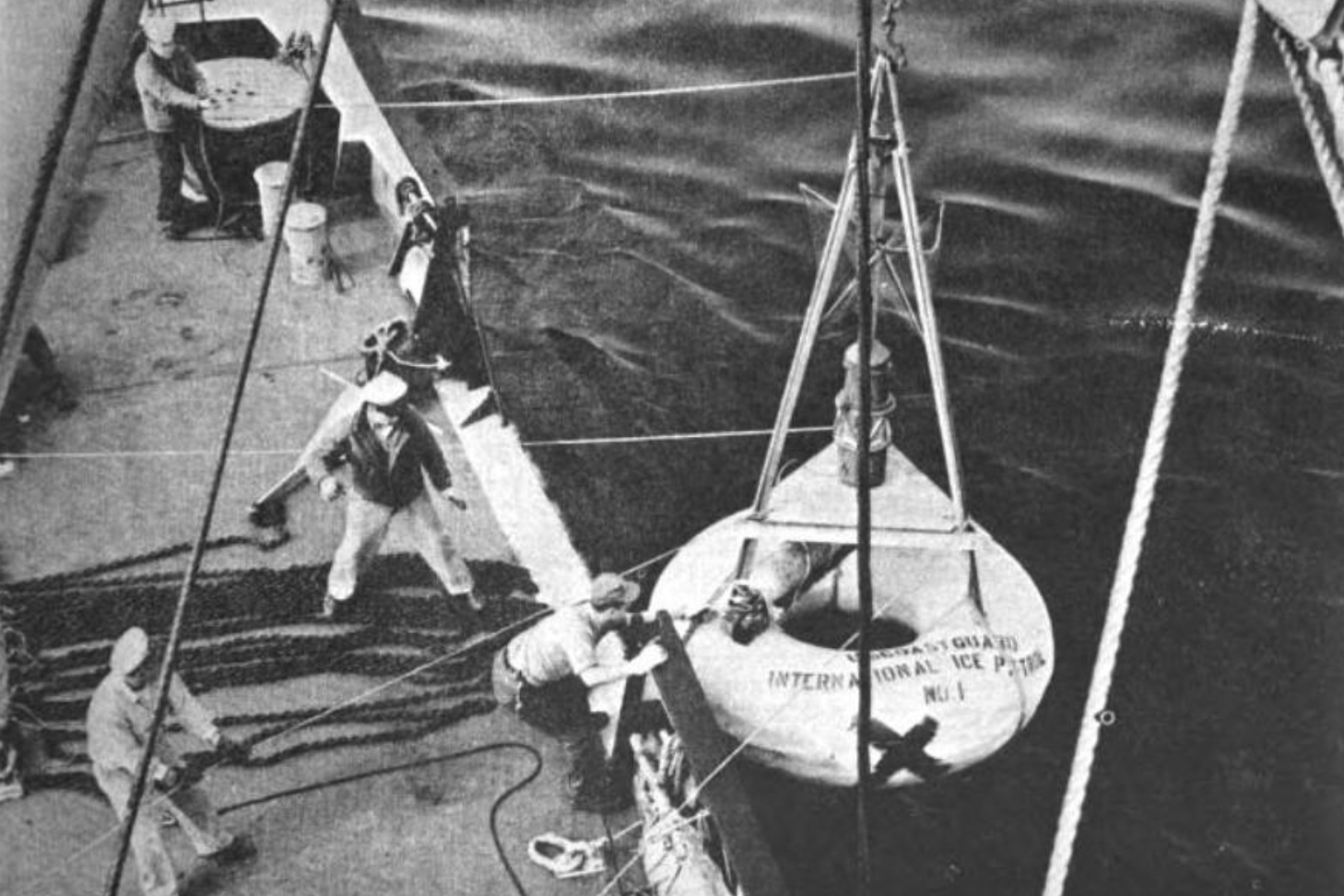
USCGC Evergreen launching an experimental oceanographic buoy

In 1964, Evergreen was converted to an oceanographic vessel and re-designated WAGO-295. She was the first dedicated oceanographic vessel in the Coast Guard's history. During the conversion, a PDP-5 computer was installed, and Evergreen became the first government oceanographic ship to have one. As an oceanographic vessel, she was also converted from a black-hull paint scheme to a white-hull paint scheme, which she wore until decommissioned.

Her ice patrol duties continued under her new designation, and extended further into the Arctic. In 1964 she explored Kennedy Channel, north of Baffin Bay, with a team of scientists from the University of Washington, Dartmouth, and Woods Hole Oceanographic Institute. Her oceanographic studies took her across the Atlantic to Germany in 1965. In 1966 she sailed to the coast of Brazil to take water temperature, salinity, and oxygen content readings.

On 23 December 1968 Evergreen suffered a major fire in her engine room while tied to the pier at the Coast Guard's Boston base. Two of her crew were overcome by the smoke. The fire was put out in two hours, but damage was extensive. She was repaired at the Coast Guard Yard at Curtis Bay, Maryland and was back at sea by April 1970.

In 1972, Evergreen underwent a $2 million renovation at the Coast Guard Yard. New fresh water and sewage systems were installed. A bow thruster was added to increase her maneuverability. Crew quarters were renovated and modernized. The deckhouse was expanded and new laboratories were added. In March 1973 Evergreen sailed to her new homeport, New London, Connecticut. She left almost immediately for her regular ice patrol in the North Atlantic.

== Medium endurance cutter (1982–1990) ==
By 1982 aircraft and satellites had grown in their capacity to monitor ice in the shipping lanes, leading to less reliance on ship-based data. Also, in 1970 the National Oceanographic and Atmospheric Administration was established, and it too had grown in its capabilities. Amidst Reagan-administration budget cuts, the Coast Guard's oceanographic research program was ended. Evergreen was converted to a Medium-Endurance Cutter, and re-designated WMEC-295. For the rest of her career she would focus on law enforcement and fisheries management missions.

She got right to work in her new role, seizing an Italian vessel off the coast of New Jersey fishing illegally for squid in September 1982. On 1 May 1983 she boarded a vessel 35 miles off Montauk and discovered 26 tons of marijuana. When Evergreen brought the boat back to New London, it became the largest drug seizure in Connecticut history to that time. The sailboat she seized in 1984 had 4 tons of marijuana in her cargo. Evergreen caught another sailboat smuggling 700 pounds of cocaine in Florida waters in 1990.

The Coast Guard considered decommissioning Evergreen when the oceanography program she supported ended in 1982, but the ship was retained as a medium-endurance cutter. Her retirement was then linked to the construction of her replacement in the medium-endurance cutter fleet, USCGC Tahoma. Evergreen was finally decommissioned on 26 June 1990, 48 years after her launch. During the course of her Coast Guard service she was awarded the Unit Commendation twice, the Meritorious Unit Commendation three times, the Arctic Service Medal, and the E-ribbon, among other honors.

She was used by the U.S. Navy as a target and sunk during a fleet exercise on 25 November 1992.
