= Department of the Environment Act (Canada) =

The Department of the Environment Act establishes Environment Canada as the federal agency in Canada responsible for the preservation and enhancement of the quality of the natural environment. The Act specifies that the Department (Environment Canada) will be governed by the Minister of the Environment. Provincial and territorial governments in Canada also have jurisdiction for environmental quality (such as regional air quality management).

The Act describes the powers of the Minister as related to water, air and soil quality; renewable resources, including migratory birds and other non-domestic flora and fauna; meteorology; the enforcement of rules and regulations arising from the advice of the International Joint Commission relating to boundary waters and questions arising between the United States and Canada insofar as they relate to the preservation and enhancement of environmental quality.

The Act requires that the Minister must submit an annual report to Parliament by January 31 showing the operations of the Department for that fiscal year.
