= European Pollutant Release and Transfer Register =

The European Pollutant Release and Transfer Register (E-PRTR) is a Pollutant Release and Transfer Register providing access to information on the annual emissions of industrial facilities in the Member States of the European Union (EU), as well as Norway.

EPER collects data about the emissions of 12,000 facilities in the 25 EU Member States. Data are available by country, by pollutant, by activity (sector), air and water (direct or via a sewerage system).
