= Pollutant release and transfer register =

System for registering environmental pollutants

A pollutant release and transfer register (PRTR) is a system for collecting and disseminating information about environmental releases and transfers of hazardous substances from industrial and other facilities.

PRTRs were established in several countries after the 1984 Bhopal Disaster and the 1992 United Nations Conference on Environment and Development in Rio de Janeiro, which affirmed communities' and workers' right to know about toxic chemicals and other substances of concern.

== Community right to know ==
In many countries industrial facilities need a permit to operate processes that are causing environmental pressures. Authorities have to balance the interests of different actors when issuing such permits and will reflect this balance in the conditions and requirements put down in the permit. Companies and civilians living near to the facilities generally have quite different levels of understanding and information on the processes and the environmental impact. In a democratic context however a level playing field for all actors involved in permitting decisions is paramount to acceptance of the decisions. Against this background, a protocol to the Aarhus Convention requires the parties to this convention to set up PRTRs as a tool to provide the general public this type of information.

The European Union is a party to the UNECE Protocol on PRTRs and created its own register, the European Pollutant Release and Transfer Register (E-PRTR). This register was established by Regulation (EC) No. 166/2006.

== Data quality ==
A PRTR is a type of emission inventory, typically containing data on emissions to the environment from individual industrial facilities. PRTR data collection methods for individual facility emissions typically utilize questionnaires sent to individual facilities or firms. The answers are validated upon receipt by the competent authorities and published on a public web site.

In accordance with the idea of community right to know, this procedure ensures that data are published as soon as they are available. Despite the validation by competent authorities, the data remain essentially the facilities' estimates and data quality control essentially depends on data users asking questions. Since facilities are by definition only a part of all activities in a country, the sum of the emissions reported in a PRTR should for each pollutant be less than or equal to the total emissions reported in national inventories.

== Examples ==
- Australia: National Pollutant Inventory (NPI)
- Canada: National Pollutant Release Inventory (NPRI)
- European Union: European Pollutant Release and Transfer Register (E-PRTR)
- Mexico: Registro de Emisiones y Transferencia de Contaminantes (RETC)
- Turkey: Pollutant Release and Transfer Register (however as of September 2024 no years of data are publicly available as it is not complete (see FAQ).
- United States: Toxics Release Inventory (TRI)
