= National Pollutant Release Inventory =

Canadian pollutant release and transfer register

The National Pollutant Release Inventory (NPRI), established in 1992, and launched in 1993, is the national pollutant release and transfer register of Canada. This list of pollutants contains releases from a facility to the air, water, and land along with disposals at, or from a facility. Reported information is used in the creation of pollution management plans and to inform Canadians about their environment.

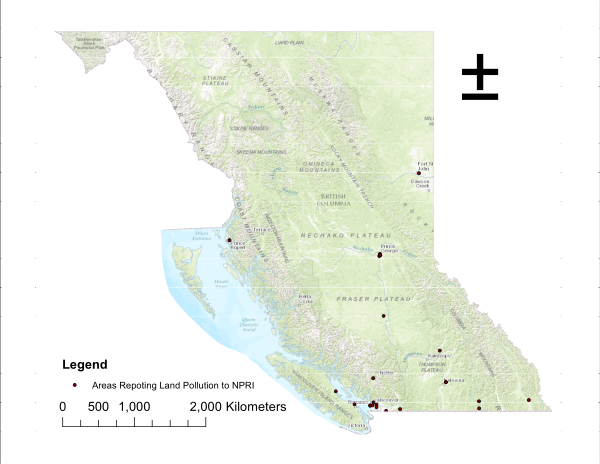
A map of British Columbia that displays the areas such as factories which are reporting land pollution to the NPRI

Facilities which meet reporting requirements are required to report to the NPRI under the Canadian Environmental Protection Act, 1999 (CEPA 1999). Over 300 substances are listed on the NPRI, and over 8,000 facilities annually report information on their pollutant releases and transfers to Environment and Climate Change Canada.

NPRI data is available through an on-line Query search, downloadable Microsoft Access (mdb) format datasets, and downloadable map layers for use with Google Earth (which were the first Google Earth map layers to be published by the Government of Canada).

== Use ==
The NPRI records information about:

- Releases from facilities to air, water and land
- Disposals at facilities and transfers to other locations for disposal
- Transfers to other locations for treatment or disposal and
- Facilities’ activities, location and contacts

All orders of government, companies and associations use NPRI data to track national environmental performance. The NPRI is also used to inform Canadians of the pollutants in their communities, identify environmental priorities and track progress in pollution prevention. Other uses include evaluating releases and transfers of any substances of concern, model air quality and implement policy initiatives. An overview of the NPRI is released annually and is known as the NPRI data highlights.

Data collected by the NPRI is accessible in a variety of ways including:

- Annual data highlights
- Annual summary report
- Online query tool
- Single year tables
- Five-year summaries
- Datasets for all years

Data is provided in the language in which it was submitted, and updated at least once every year.

== Reporting requirements ==
Reporting to the NPRI is mandatory under CEPA. Facility owners and operators may need to report if one or more of these conditions is met:

- The facility’s owners, operators and employees work more than 20,000 hours (about 10 full-time employees) per year
- The facility performs activities including, waste or sewage sludge incineration, wood preservation, fuel terminal operations, municipal wastewater collection and/or treatment, pit or quarry operations, and operation of stationary combustion equipment (regardless of employee hours)
- The facility operates stationary combustion equipment that must report criteria air contaminants if the release thresholds are met (regardless of employee hours)
- The facility is a pipeline installation

Facility owners and operators report their substances by using the tools found on the on-line reporting software known as the Single Window reporting module. This software guides users through a comprehensive questionnaire in order to organize and set up their annual report.
