= Canadian Environmental Protection Act, 1999 =

Canadian law

Parliament of Canada
- Long title: An Act Respecting Pollution Prevention and the Protection of the Environment and Human Health in Order to Contribute to Sustainable Development
- Citation: S.C. 1999, c. 33
- Enacted by: Parliament of Canada
- Assented to: September 14, 1999
- Commenced: March 31, 2000

Legislative history
- Bill citation: Bill C-32
- Introduced by: Christine Stewart, Minister of the Environment
- First reading: March 12, 1998
- Second reading: April 28, 1998
- Third reading: June 1, 1999
- First reading: June 2, 1999
- Second reading: June 8, 1999
- Third reading: September 13, 1999

Repeals
- Canadian Environmental Protection Act (c. 16, R.S.C. 1985 (4th Supp.))

Summary
- Legislative summary

The Canadian Environmental Protection Act, 1999 (CEPA, 1999; French: Loi canadienne sur la protection de l'environnement (1999)) is an act of the 36th Parliament of Canada, whose goal is to contribute to sustainable development through pollution prevention and to protect the environment, human life and health from the risks associated with toxic substances. It covers a diversity of activities that can affect human health and the environment, and acts to address any pollution issues not covered by other federal laws. As such, the act is a "catch all" piece of legislation that ensures potentially toxic substances are not inadvertently exempt from federal oversight as a result of unforeseen legislative loopholes.

The act also recognizes the contribution of pollution prevention and the management and control of toxic substances and hazardous waste to reducing threats to Canada's ecosystems and biological diversity.

It acknowledges, for the first time, the need to virtually eliminate the most persistent toxic substances that remain in the environment for extended periods of time before breaking down and bioaccumulative toxic substances that accumulate within living organisms.

Two federal ministries, Health Canada and Environment and Climate Change Canada as they were known in 2022, work in partnership to assess potentially toxic substances and to develop regulations to control toxic substances.

Section 93 of the act provides the authority to the federal government to make regulations to restrict and manage the Canadian List of Toxic Substances (LOTS). Toxic substances have characteristics outlined in Section 64. Once a regulation is proposed, interested parties have 60 days to provide comments on the proposed instrument or may file a notice of objection requesting that a board of review be established.

== History ==
The act was originally enacted in 1988 and was designed to provide a systematic approach to assess and manage chemical substances in the environment that were not addressed under existing programs.

In 1990 with SOR/90-583: Ozone-depleting Substances Regulations No. 2 (certain bromofluorocarbons) were added to the LOTS.

In 1997 the Supreme Court of Canada adjudicated the case of R. v. Hydro-Québec, by which an attempt was made to enforce the CEPA in the matter of poly-chlorinated biphenyls as a large quantity of said substances had been dumped into a stream by the respondent. Justices Gérard La Forest, Claire L'Heureux-Dubé, Charles Gonthier, Peter Cory and Beverley McLachlin held that "the environment is not, as such, a subject matter of legislation under the Constitution Act, 1867. Rather, it is a diffuse subject that cuts across many different areas of constitutional responsibility, some federal, some provincial. If a provision relating to the environment in pith and substance falls within the parameters of any power assigned to the body that enacted the legislation, then it is constitutionally valid." The fines were upheld and the CEPA was deemed valid legislation under the criminal law power.

After being reviewed in the 1990s, it was replaced by the current legislation that provides new powers for health and environmental protection. It was introduced by the 26th Canadian Ministry as Bill C-32 on March 12, 1998, subsequently receiving royal assent on September 14, 1999. The act came into force on March 31, 2000.

As a Canadian statute, the act is unique for including a declaration of "primary purpose" in addition to a preamble.

On April 23, 2021, the LOTS was amended by regulation to include plastic manufactured items, in advance of the June 20, 2022, regulation for the Canadian ban on single-use plastics (SUP), which was introduced by the Minister of Environment and Climate Change Steven Guilbeault. The SUP ban included such items as straws, takeout containers, grocery bags, cutlery, stir sticks and plastic rings.

The act received ENVI committee attention in 2021 because of Volkswagen Dieselgate.

As of July 2022, the act had received 13 amendments over its quarter-century existence.

== New and existing substances ==
=== Toxic substances ===
Toxic substances have characteristics outlined in Section 64 of the CEPA. Once a regulation is proposed, interested parties have 60 days to provide comments on the proposed instrument or may file a notice of objection requesting that a Board of Review be established.

A useful case study for process of addition to the list is discovered by the travels of microplastic beads: The end of the public input process occurred on March 10, 2016; they were added to the LOTS on June 29; on November 5 proposed regulations on their uses were put forth for public comment; on June 14, 2017, final regulations were published; and on July 1, 2018, the manufacture and import of all toiletries that contain plastic microbeads were prohibited.

=== New substances ===
All new substances must be evaluated for human health and environmental risks before they can be manufactured or imported into Canada. Responsibility for these evaluations is shared between Environment Canada and Health Canada and is administered by the New Substances Program, which administers regulations relating to the notification of new substances into the environment.

=== Existing substances ===
Existing substances include all 23,000 substances that were in use in Canada prior to the establishment of the New Substances Notification Program, and they are all listed on the Domestic Substances List (DSL). The act required systematic screening of these substances, a process that was completed in September 2006, which led to the development of the Chemicals Management Plan.

=== Biotechnology ===
The 23,000 existing substances on the DSL included 67 microbial strains and 2 complex microbial cultures. These substances were subject to a separate prioritization assessment and accordingly evaluated.

Health Canada and Environment Canada share responsibility for conducting risk assessments of new biotechnology products (including micro-organisms) that are not subject to a pre-manufacture toxicity assessment under other federal legislation. Under the act, both naturally occurring and genetically modified organisms are evaluated under the New Substances Notification Regulations (Organisms).

Risk assessment decisions are summarized and posted publicly.

== Amendments ==
=== Bill S-5 ===
On May 30, 2023, the House of Commons passed Bill S-5, the first major update to CEPA since 1999. Viewed by the David Suzuki Foundation as "long overdue important progress", Bill S-5 addresses some, but not all, of the 87 recommendations to strengthen CEPA made by a 2017 parliamentary review.

For the first time in Canadian history, the bill recognizes the right to a healthy environment. The bill additionally highlights fracking and tailings ponds as particular areas of concern, granting the government more authority to request information on substances released from these processes. Moreover, Bill S-5 requires the offices of the Minister of Environment and the Minister of Health to compile a 'watch list' of substances which have either not been assessed yet, or are not in widespread use, but have the potential to be deemed 'toxic' and consequently subjected to potential regulation.

Bill S-5 also adds various accountability mechanisms within CEPA that were previously lacking, such as the creation of a two-year windows in which a potential toxic chemical or substance must be assessed.

Bill S-5 also amends CEPA to encourage "the development and timely incorporation" of substance testing methods alternative to those involving vertebrate animals. The government is also required to develop a plan, within two years, to 'encourage' and facilitate this transition.

Bill S-5 received royal assent on June 13, 2023.

== Enforcement, penalties and prosecution ==
Enforcement activities related to the act can include:

- warnings regarding the existence of a violation so that the alleged offender can act and return to compliance;
- directions to deal with or to prevent illegal releases of regulated substances;
- tickets for offences (e.g. failure to submit written reports);
- various orders (e.g. prohibition orders, orders to recall illegal substances or products from the marketplace, environmental protection compliance orders to put an immediate stop to illegal activity) to prevent a violation from occurring or require action to be taken;
- injunctions;
- prosecution under the authority of a Crown prosecutor; and
- environmental protection alternative measures. REHANT

=== Environmental Enforcement Act ===
Fines under the Environmental Enforcement Act (EEA) range from $5,000 to $6,000,000. The EEA applies to offences under CEPA 1999. The EEA also allows the enforcement officers to arrest a person without warrant, to seize or detain items related to a CEPA 1999 offence or related evidence, and to detain or redirect ships suspected of an offence. Convictions or indictments under the EEA can also result in imprisonment up to three years. Prosecutions under CEPA 1999 are listed on Environment Canada's website.

=== Selected regulations ===
- Prohibition of Certain Toxic Substances Regulations
- Prohibition of Asbestos and Products Containing Asbestos Regulations
- Canadian Toys Regulation
- Health Canada Medical Device Licensing
- Canadian Phthalates Regulations (SOR/2016-188)
- Products Containing Mercury Regulations
