= USCGC Southwind =

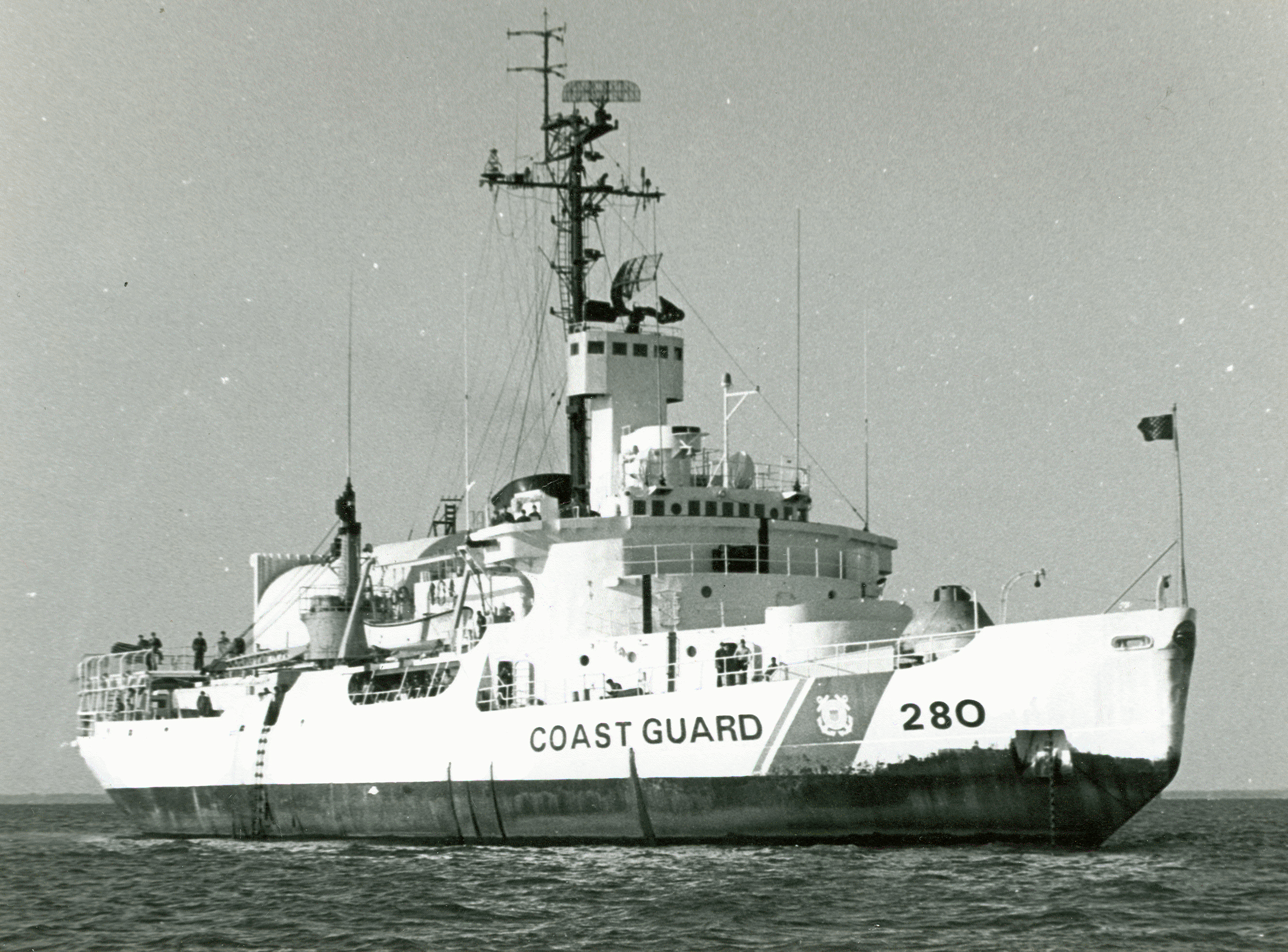
- USCGC Southwind in December 1970

History

United States
- Name: USCGC Southwind
- Builder: Western Pipe and Steel Company
- Cost: $9,880,037.00
- Yard number: CG-98
- Laid down: 20 July 1942
- Launched: 8 March 1943
- Sponsored by: Mrs. Ona Jones
- Commissioned: 15 July 1944 (USCG)
- Decommissioned: 23 March 1945 (USCG)
- Identification: WAG-280
- Fate: transferred to USSR on 25 March 1945

Soviet Union
- Name: Admiral Makarov
- Namesake: Stepan Makarov
- Acquired: 25 March 1945
- Fate: Returned to the United States, on 28 December 1949

United States
- Name: USS Atka
- Namesake: Atka Island
- Acquired: 28 December 1949
- Commissioned: 13 April 1950
- Decommissioned: 31 October 1966
- Identification: AGB-3
- Fate: Transferred back to USCG, 31 October 1966
- Stricken: 1 November 1966

United States
- Name: USCGC Southwind
- Acquired: 31 October 1966
- Recommissioned: 31 October 1966
- Decommissioned: 31 May 1974
- Identification: WAGB-280; Call sign: NMBT
- Nickname(s): The Polar Prowler
- Fate: Sold for scrap on 17 March 1976

General characteristics
- Class & type: Wind-class icebreaker
- Displacement: 6,515 tons (1945)
- Length: 269 ft (82 m) oa
- Beam: 63 ft 6 in (19.35 m) mb
- Draft: 25 ft 9 in (7.85 m) max
- Installed power: Diesel-electric: 6 × Fairbanks-Morse model 8-1/8OP, 10-cylinder opposed-piston engines at 2,000 shp (1,500 kW), each driving a Westinghouse DC electric generator.
- Propulsion: 2 × Westinghouse Electric DC electric motors driving the 2 aft propellers, 1 × 3,000 shp (2,200 kW) Westinghouse DC electric motor driving the detachable and seldom used bow propeller.
- Speed: Top speed: 13.4 kn (24.8 km/h) (1967); Economic speed: 11.6 kn (21.5 km/h)
- Range: 32,485 nmi (60,162 km)
- Complement: 12 officers, 2 warrants, 205 men (1967)
- Sensors & processing systems: Radar: SPS-10B; SPS-53A; SPS-6C (1967); Sonar: QCJ-8 (1944)
- Armament: 4 × 5"/38 (twin mounts); 12 × 40mm/60 (quad mounts); 6 × 20mm/80 (single mounts); 2 × depth charge tracks; 6 × K-guns; 1 Hedgehog; M2 Browning machine guns and small arms (1944)
- Aircraft carried: 1 Grumman J2F seaplane or 2 helicopters
- Aviation facilities: Retractable hangar

USCGC Southwind (WAGB-280) was a Wind-class icebreaker that served in the United States Coast Guard as USCGC Southwind (WAG-280), the Soviet Navy as the Admiral Makarov, the United States Navy as USS Atka (AGB-3) and again in the U.S. Coast Guard as USCGC Southwind (WAGB-280).

== Construction ==
Southwind was the third of the Wind class of icebreakers operated by the United States Coast Guard. Her keel was laid on 20 July 1942 at the Western Pipe and Steel Company shipyards in San Pedro, California, she was christened by Mrs. Ona Jones and launched on 8 March 1943, and commissioned on 15 July 1944.

Wind-class icebreakers had hulls of unprecedented strength and structural integrity, with a relatively short length in proportion to the great power developed, a cut away forefoot, rounded bottom, and fore, aft and side heeling tanks. Diesel electric machinery was chosen for its controllability and resistance to damage.

Southwind, along with the other Wind-class icebreakers, was heavily armed for an icebreaker due to her design being crafted during World War II. Her main battery consisted of two twin-mount 5-inch (127 mm) deck guns. Her anti-aircraft weaponry consisted of three quad-mounted Bofors 40 mm anti-aircraft autocannons and six Oerlikon 20 mm autocannons. She also carried six K-gun depth charge projectors and a Hedgehog as anti-submarine weapons. After her return from Soviet service she had a single 5"/38 caliber gun mount forward and a helicopter deck aft. In 1968 the forward mount was removed.

== First U.S. Coast Guard service ==
On 15 July 1944, she was commissioned as USCGC Southwind (WAG-280).

After service on the Greenland Patrol, and assisting USCGC Eastwind in capturing the German weather ship Externsteine, Southwind was transferred to the Soviet Union on 23 or 25 March 1945 as part of the Lend-Lease Program.

== Soviet service ==
The ship served in the Soviet merchant marine under the name Admiral Makarov (Russian: Адмирал Макаров, named in honor of Stepan Makarov) until being returned to the U.S. Navy on 28 December 1949 at Yokosuka, Japan.

== U.S. Navy service ==
In 1950 the ship was transferred to the U.S. Navy and rechristened as USS Atka (AGB-3), after the small Aleutian island of Atka. Upon arrival at her home port of Boston, Atka entered the Boston Naval Shipyard for a thorough overhaul and modernization. The work was completed late in May 1951, and Atka began operations from Boston, Massachusetts in July 1951.

Throughout her career in the American navy, the icebreaker followed a routine established by the changing seasons. In the late spring, she would set sail for either the northern or southern polar regions to resupply American and Canadian air bases and weather and radar stations. In early fall, she would return to Boston for upkeep and repairs. In the winter, the ship would sail various routes in the North Atlantic Ocean to gather weather data before returning to Boston in early spring for repairs and preparation for her annual polar expedition.

The ship often carried civilian scientists who plotted data on ocean currents and ocean water characteristics. They also assembled hydrographic data on the poorly charted polar regions. Atka was also involved in numerous tests of cold weather equipment and survival techniques.

She served in the Atlantic fleet and completed three Arctic tours.

Atka conducted a notable expeditionary cruise to Antarctica for Operation Deep Freeze, scouting locations for science stations in support of the International Geophysical Year. She departed Boston on 1 December 1954, and after stops at Rodman Naval Station and Wellington, she sighted Scott Island and first ice on 12 January 1955, and encountered the Ross Ice Barrier on 14 January, marking her arrival at the continent. Atka conducted surveys, samplings, and experiments from the Ross Sea eastward to Princess Martha Coast until she departed the region on 19 February 1955. After stops at Buenos Aires and Rio de Janeiro, Atka returned to Boston on 12 April 1955, completing her mission.

== Second U.S. Coast Guard service ==
On 31 October 1966 she was transferred to the United States Coast Guard and christened again as USCGC Southwind (WAGB-280), changed homeport to the United States Coast Guard Yard at Curtis Bay, Baltimore, Maryland.

After a shakedown cruise to Bermuda she proceeded on its first operational cruise north to Thule, Greenland.

She deployed to the Arctic in 1967, 1969, 1970, 1971, 1972 and 1973, as well as to the Antarctic in December 1967, December 1968 and January 1972. In 1968 she was involved in a diplomatic incident between Chile and Argentine about navigation rights in the Beagle channel.

In September 1970, Southwind visited the port of Murmansk, being the first U.S. naval vessel to visit a Soviet port since the start of the cold war. During that visit, she took aboard a boilerplate (BP-1227) from the Apollo program. The boilerplate had been lost in the North Sea in early 1970, recovered by a Soviet fishing trawler in the Bay of Biscay, transferred to the Soviet Union, and passed to Southwind on 5 September 1970.

From December 1972 to 31 May 1974 Southwind was stationed in Milwaukee to do icebreaking on the Great Lakes.

Southwind was decommissioned on 31 May 1974, and sold for scrap on 17 March 1976 for $231,079.00 to Union Mineral & Alloy Corporation of New York.
