= USCGC Sequoia =

U.S. Coast Guard seagoing buoy tender

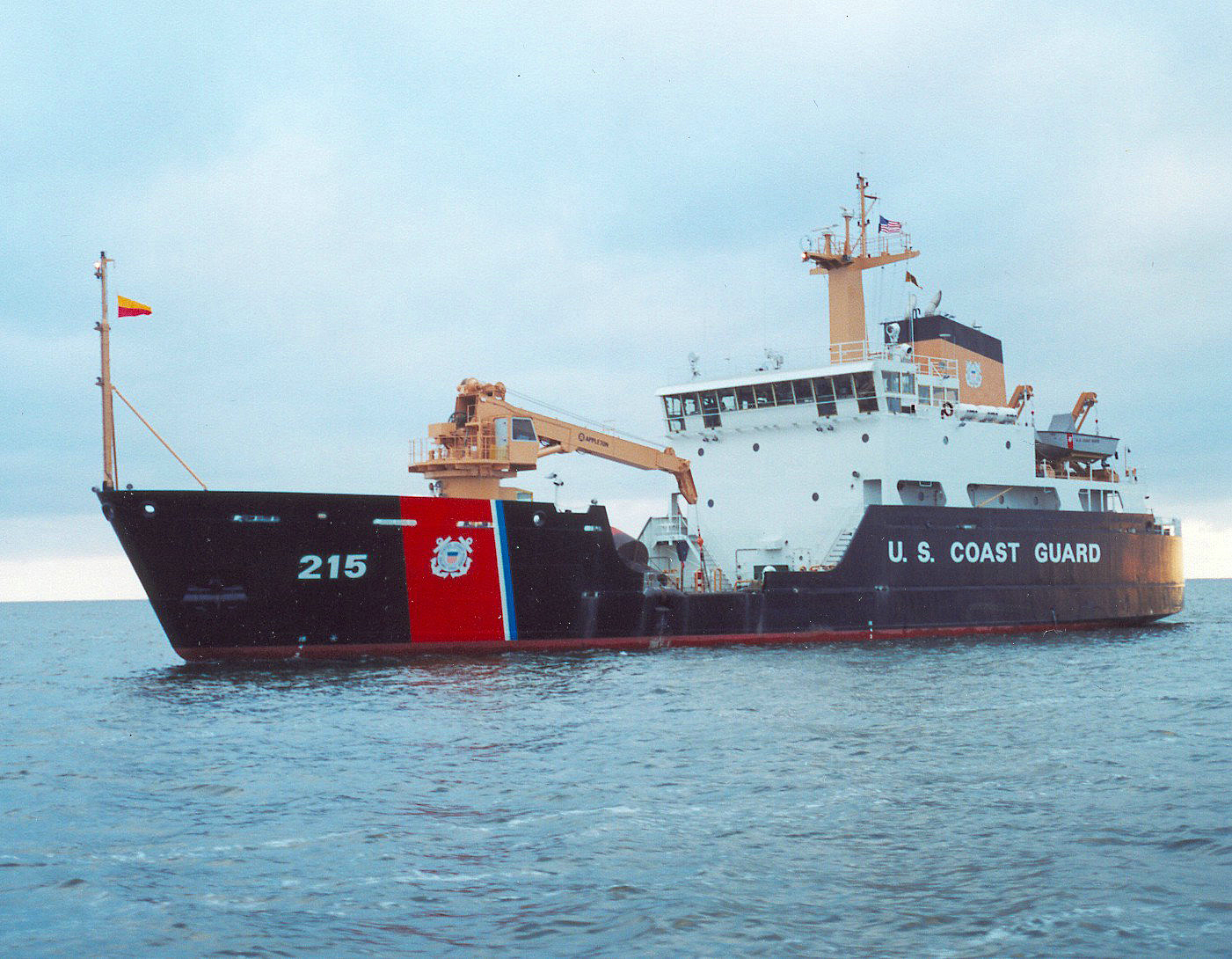
- USCGC Sequoia.

History

United States
- Launched: August 23, 2003
- Acquired: April 21, 2004
- Commissioned: October 15, 2004
- Home port: Port Huron, Michigan
- Identification: IMO number: 9259989; MMSI number: 369941000; Callsign: NBHF
- Motto: Blue Water Pearl (formerly Black Pearl of the Pacific)
- Status: in active service
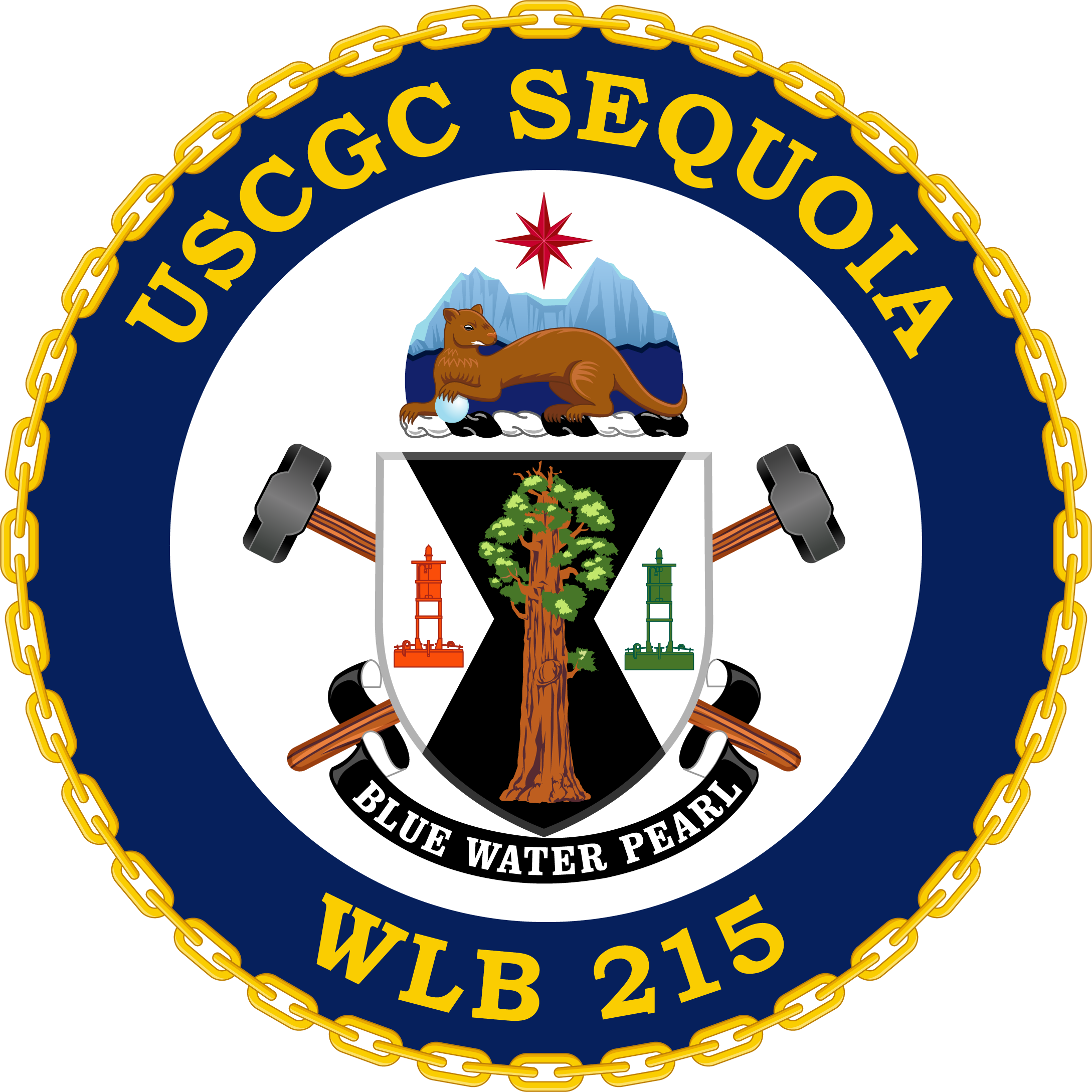
- Badge

General characteristics
- Class & type: Juniper
- Tonnage: 1,930 GT
- Displacement: 2,000 long tons (2,000 t)
- Length: 225 ft (69 m)
- Beam: 46 ft (14 m)
- Draft: 13 ft (4.0 m)
- Speed: 15 kn (28 km/h; 17 mph)
- Complement: 7 officers, 43 enlisted

USCGC Sequoia (WLB-215) is a United States Coast Guard 225-foot seagoing buoy tender, homeported in Port Huron, Michigan.

The primary mission of the cutter is to maintain aids to navigation. As with all Coast Guard cutters, she functions as a multi-mission asset, responsible for marine environmental protection, search and rescue, law enforcement, and Homeland Security missions.

Sequoia is one of sixteen Juniper-class buoy tenders built and commissioned from 1996–2004. She was launched on August 23, 2003 on the Menominee River by Marinette Marine Corporation (MMC) in Marinette, Wisconsin. She replaced the USCGC Sassafras (WLB-401) as the only buoy tender in the Marianas. Delivered on April 21, 2004, Sequoia was commissioned in Santa Rita, Guam on October 15, 2004 after completing the 13,000-mile voyage from Wisconsin to Apra Harbor. The sponsor was Dorothy England, the wife of Secretary of the Navy Gordon R. England, and the first commanding officer was Lt. Cmdr. Matthew T. Meilstrup.

While stationed in Guam, USCGC Sequoia regularly conducted fisheries enforcement missions through the Western Pacific, in support of Western and Central Pacific Fisheries Commission treaties and regulations, as well as supporting bilateral agreements between the Pacific Island nations of the Marshall Islands and the Federated States of Micronesia.

After completing her major midlife maintenance, Sequoia left the Coast Guard Yard in Curtis Bay, Maryland on August 21, 2024. She arrived at her new home port of Port Huron, Michigan on September 7, 2024.
