= Joseph Vojvodich =

American Coast Guard officer (born 1963)

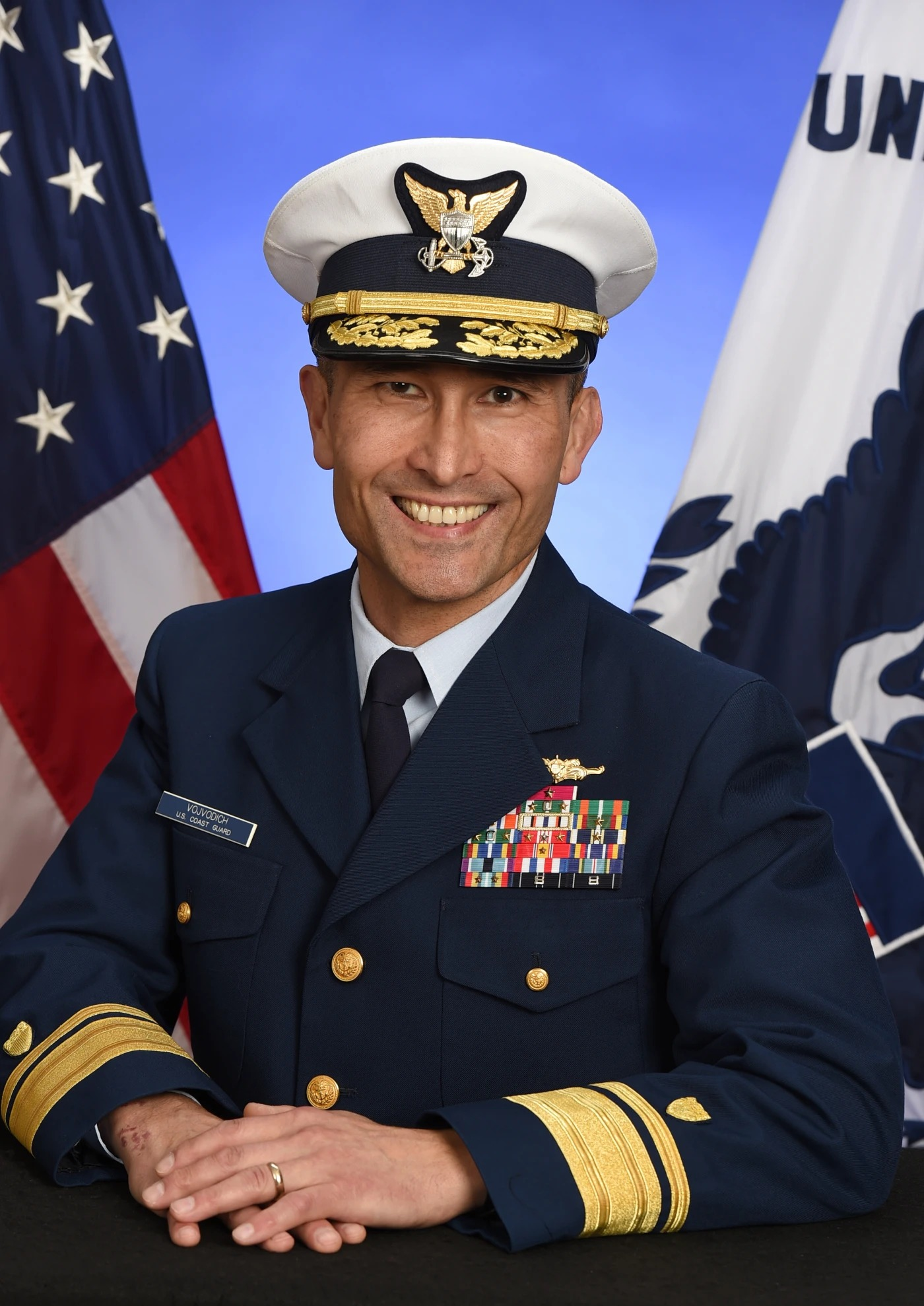
- Born: 1963 (age 62–63); South Korea
- Education: United States Coast Guard Academy (BS); Purdue University (MS); Industrial College of the Armed Forces (MS)
- Spouse: Donna
- Children: 3
- Military career
- Branch: United States Coast Guard
- Service years: 1985–2020
- Rank: Rear Admiral
- Commands: USCGC Gentian; USCGC Sapelo; Captain of the Port of Long Island Sound; Coast Guard Sector Long Island Sound
- Awards: Legion of Merit

Joseph M. Vojvodich (born 1963) is the first Asian American to become a flag officer in the United States Coast Guard.

== Early life ==
Vojvodich was born in South Korea in 1963 to U.S. Army soldier Joseph Vojvodich and Su Cha Mun. He is of Korean and Serbian sescent. He was raised in Richmond, Ohio. He graduated from Jefferson Union High School in 1981. He graduated from the U.S. Coast Guard Academy in 1985 where he had played football and track and field. He earned a master's degree in electrical engineering from Purdue University and is a graduate of the Naval War College. He also earned a masters of science in national resource strategy from the Industrial College of the Armed Forces.

== Coast Guard career ==
Vojvodich was a navigator on the USCGC John Midgett and executive officer on the USCGC Storis. He was the commanding officer of the USCGC Gentian and USCGC Sapelo. He was captain of the Port of Long Island Sound until June 2010. While commander of the Gentian he wrote "Building an Effective Maritime Neighborhood Watch in the Caribbean" for the U.S. Naval Institute.

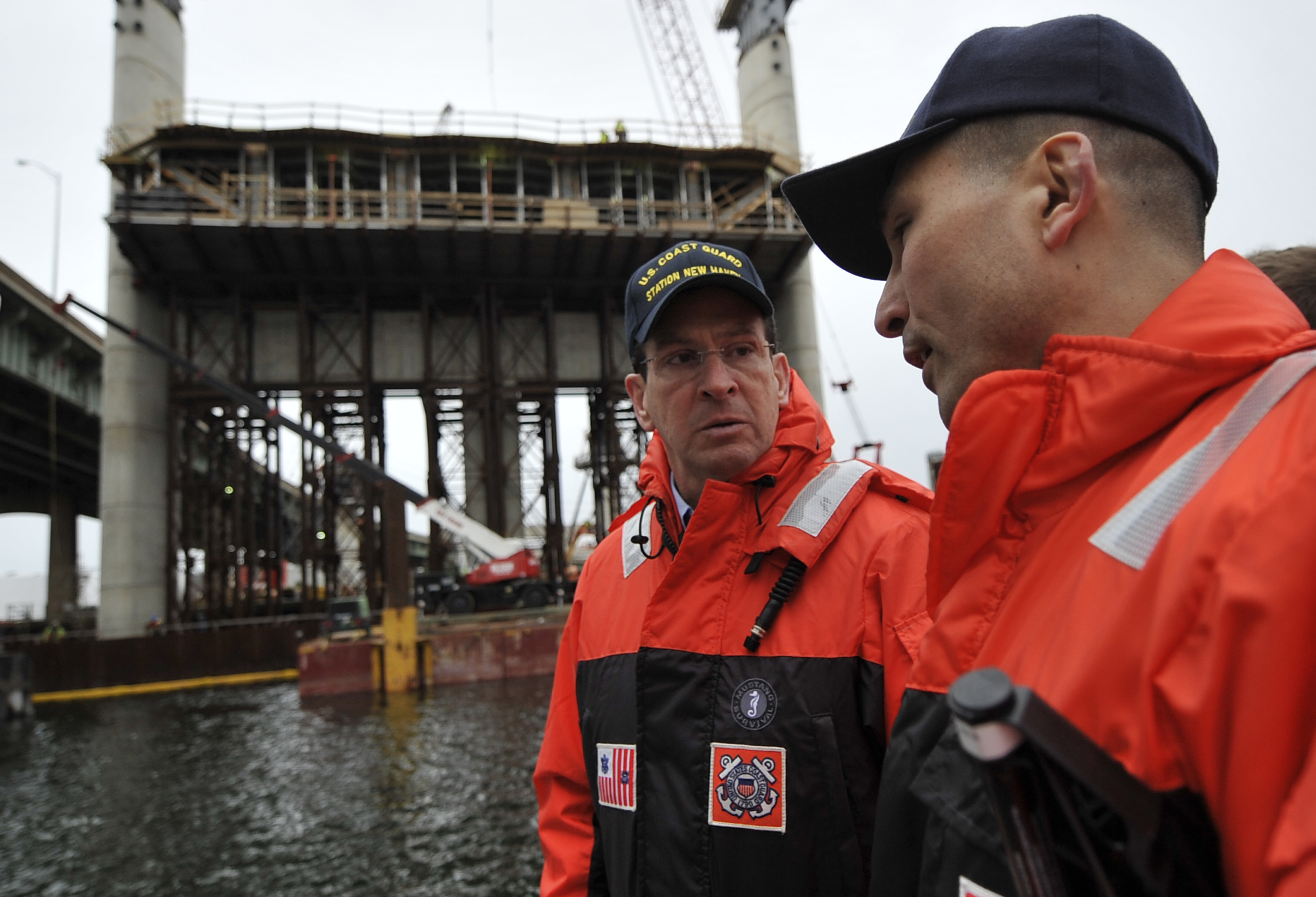
31 March 2011 -- Gov. Dannel Malloy speaks with Capt. Joseph Vojvodich, Sector Long Island Sound Commander, about the duties and responsibilities of the Coast Guard throughout the shoreline of Connecticut, New Haven, Conn., during a tour. Coast Guard photograph by Petty Officer 3rd Class Seth Johnson.

On 12 May 2012 he was awarded the National Ethnic Coalition Medal of Honor, which "honors ancestry groups that comprise America's unique cultural mosaic," at Ellis Island.

As a captain, he was Commander of Coast Guard Sector Long Island Sound 2010–2013. He was promoted to Rear Admiral (lower half) 1 July 2013, and became the program executive officer and director of acquisition programs at USCG headquarters.

His other assignments have been deputy for mission support at USCG headquarters and deputy for Materiel Readiness at USCG Headquarters

On 10 October 2019, Vojvodich was awarded the Society of Asian Scientists and Engineers Salutes Career Service Award in Pittsburgh, Pennsylvania.

He retired from the Coast Guard 1 August 2020.

== Honors ==
The Joseph M. Vojvodich Award is given to a Coast Guard member who has fostered a community of inclusion by providing mentorship to historically underrepresented cadets at USCGA.

- 2017: RADM Joseph M. Vojvodich
- 2018: Lt. Christine Igisomar
- 2019: Lt. Cmdr. Celina H. Ladyga
- 2020: Coast Guard Academy Scholars (CGAS) Program Leadership Team (Chris McMunn, LT Timothy J. Kessell, LT Marvi M. Rivera, YNC Jennifer C. Rosen, and YNC Deborah J. Hamilton)
- 2023: Lt. Cmdr. Mark Braxton, USCG (ret)

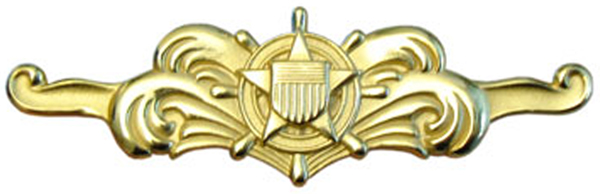

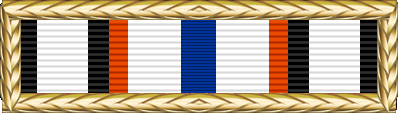

Badge	Cutterman Insignia - Officer		
1st row	Legion of Merit (2nd Award)		
2nd row	Meritorious Service Medal	Coast Guard Commendation Medal (3rd Award)	Coast Guard Achievement Medal
3rd row	Presidential Unit Citation	Secretary of Transportation Outstanding Unit Award	Coast Guard Unit Commendation (2nd Award)
4th row	Coast Guard Meritorious Unit Commendation (3rd Award)	Coast Guard Meritorious Team Commendation (4th Award)	Coast Guard "E" Ribbon (2nd Award)
5th row	Coast Guard Bicentennial Unit Commendation	National Defense Service Medal (2nd Award)	Global War on Terrorism Service Medal
6th row	Humanitarian Service Medal	Transportation 9-11 Ribbon	Coast Guard Special Operations Service Ribbon
7th Row	Coast Guard Sea Service Ribbon (3rd Award)	Coast Guard Rifle Marksmanship Ribbon	Coast Guard Pistol Marksmanship Ribbon
