= USS Callao (IX-205) =

U.S. Navy unclassified miscellaneous vessel

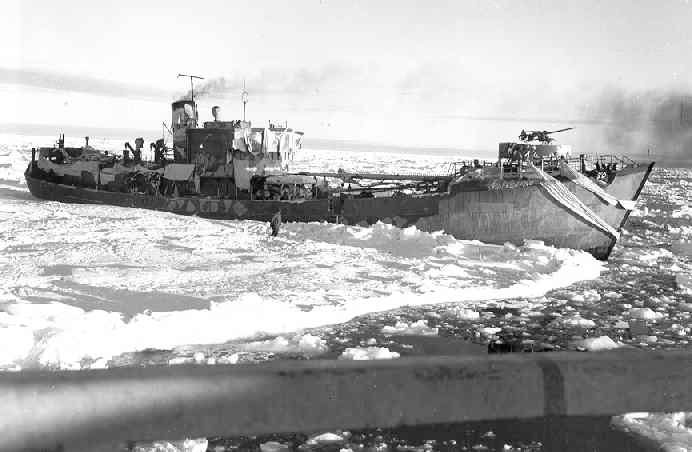
- Externsteine after being captured by USCGC Eastwind

History

Nazi Germany
- Name: Externsteine
- Namesake: The Externsteine rock formation
- Owner: Kriegsmarine
- Builder: P. Smit Jr., Rotterdam, Netherlands
- Yard number: 570
- Laid down: 1943
- Launched: 1944
- Commissioned: 1944
- Identification: WBS 11
- Captured: 16 October 1944
- Fate: Captured by United States Coast Guard

United States
- Name: USCGC East Breeze
- Owner: United States Coast Guard
- Commissioned: 16 October 1944
- Decommissioned: December 1944
- Fate: Transferred to United States Navy

United States
- Name: USS Callao
- Namesake: Callao, Peru
- Owner: United States Navy
- Commissioned: 24 January 1945
- Decommissioned: 10 May 1950
- Identification: IX-205
- Fate: Sold for scrapping, broken up in 1951

General characteristics
- Displacement: 1,015 tons
- Length: 183 ft (55.78 m)
- Beam: 30 ft 10 in (9.40 m)
- Draught: 13 ft 11 in (4.24 m)
- Installed power: Triple expansion steam engine with exhaust turbine, 750 shp
- Propulsion: Screw propeller
- Speed: 10 knots (19 km/h)
- Complement: 30 (Externsteine); 78 (Callao)
- Armament: 2-cm automatic cannon

USS Callao (IX-205), an unclassified miscellaneous vessel, was the third ship of the United States Navy to be named for Callao, a seaport in Peru. She was built for the Kriegsmarine as the weather ship and icebreaker Externsteine. The ship was captured on 16 October 1944 by USCGC Eastwind of the Greenland Patrol and was temporarily commissioned into the United States Coast Guard as USCGC East Breeze before being turned over to the United States Navy and commissioned as USS Callao in January 1945. The ship was sold out of service in 1950, and broken up the following year.

== Description ==
The ship was 183 feet (55.78 m) long, with a beam of 30 feet 10 inches (9.40 m) and a draught of 13 feet 11 inches (4.24 m). She had a displacement of 1,015 tons. She was powered by a 750 shp triple expansion steam engine with an exhaust turbine driving a single screw propeller, which could propel her at 10 knots (19 km/h).

== History ==
The ship was built in 1943–44 as yard number 570 by P. Smit, Jr. Shipyard, Rotterdam, South Holland, Netherlands. Originally intended to be the trawler Mannheim for the Nordsee Deutsche Hochseefischerei, Wesermünde, she was requisitioned by the Kriegsmarine as Externsteine. She was launched in 1944, and completed in July of that year. The ship was originally named for the unusual Externsteine rock formation investigated by Heinrich Himmler for evidence of cultural significance to early Teutonic folklore and history. Externsteine had the identification number WBS 11. Her complement was nineteen crew plus eleven meteorologists. She was employed as a weather observation ship off Shannon Island on the northeast coast of Greenland to aid forecasting of storm events tactically significant to North Atlantic and European combat operations, but was captured on the night of 15 October–16 October 1944 by the American icebreaker USCGC Eastwind.

On 2 October, a Grumman J2F Duck aircraft from USCGC Eastwind spotted a trawler camouflaged in a field of unconsolidated pack ice off North Little Koldewey Island, where the Germans had set up a weather station. The camouflaged ship was visible on the aircraft's radar. Personnel from USCGC Eastwind captured the twelve crew of the weather station on 4 October. Documents captured revealed that the ship that they had spotted was the Externsteine, which was apparently escorted by a U-boat. The search for Externsteine was delayed by the weather, but on 14 October she was found trapped in ice 10 nautical miles (19 km) off Cape Borgen. At 21:00 on 15 November, USCGC Eastwind located Externsteine at a range of 7 nautical miles (13 km) of her radar, and "battle stations" was ordered. Captain Thomas decided to attack at a range of 2 nautical miles (3.7 km), USCGC Southwind was also present, and illuminated the target with her searchlight. At a range of 4,000 yards (3,700 m), the icebreaker fired three salvos from its 5"/38 guns (one short, one over and one across the bow). The shots landed around the vessel, and the Germans used their blinker light to transmit the message "We give up" in English. The reply, sent back in German, was "Do not scuttle ship". Both icebreakers approached the ship, and the surrender was formally accepted. It was discovered that scuttling charges had been placed in the ship, but these were disarmed with the assistance of Externsteine's engineering officer. Her three officers were taken back on board the vessel during the disarming as a way of guaranteeing that the ship would not be scuttled.

The captain of Externsteine later told his captors that he thought the attack was being carried out by tanks, and he was amazed that the ships could break through the ice at the speed they did. He opined that the Americans would have to scuttle his ship as it was trapped in the ice. Externsteine was renamed East Breeze by her captors.^{[Note 1]} However, by using explosives on the ice, the ship was freed. A prize crew of 36 men from both icebreakers soon had the ship under way. At the time, it was the northernmost combat operation ever undertaken by United States forces. Externsteine was the only enemy surface vessel captured by United States naval forces during World War II.

The prize crew brought her into Boston, Massachusetts, by way of Reykjavík and Naval Station Argentia, Newfoundland. On 30 November, she was involved in a collision with USCGC Travis. At Boston, she was commissioned into the United States Navy on 24 January 1945.

Between 30 January 1945 and 4 February she was outfitted at Philadelphia Navy Yard for special experimental work for the U.S Navy Bureau of Ships, and for the next five years carried out tests in the area of Cape May, New Jersey, and Cape Henlopen, Delaware. She was decommissioned on 10 May 1950, and sold 30 September 1950. The following year she was scrapped.

== Notes ==
1. Name given in various sources as East Breeze and Eastbreeze

The Eastwind's log book for 16 October 1944 states in an asterisked note that the name is "unofficially Eastbreeze," all one word. This is obviously to reflect the name of her captor, Eastwind, which is also just one word.

== Sources ==
- Kafka, Roger & Pepperburg, Roy L. (1946). Warships of the World. Cornell Maritime Press.
- Price, Scott T (2014). "Arctic Combat: The Capture of the German Naval Auxiliary Externsteine by the Coast Guard Icebreakers Eastwind & Southwind in Greenland, 1944". Coast Guard History. U.S. Coast Guard Historian's Office.
- Rohwer, J. & Hummelchen, G. (1992). Chronology of the War at Sea 1939–1945. Naval Institute Press. ISBN 978-1-55750-105-9.
- Thomas, Charles W. (August 1965). "Capture at Sea in Perspective". United States Naval Institute Proceedings. 91: 108–109.
