= USCGC Gentian =

US/Columbian buoy tender

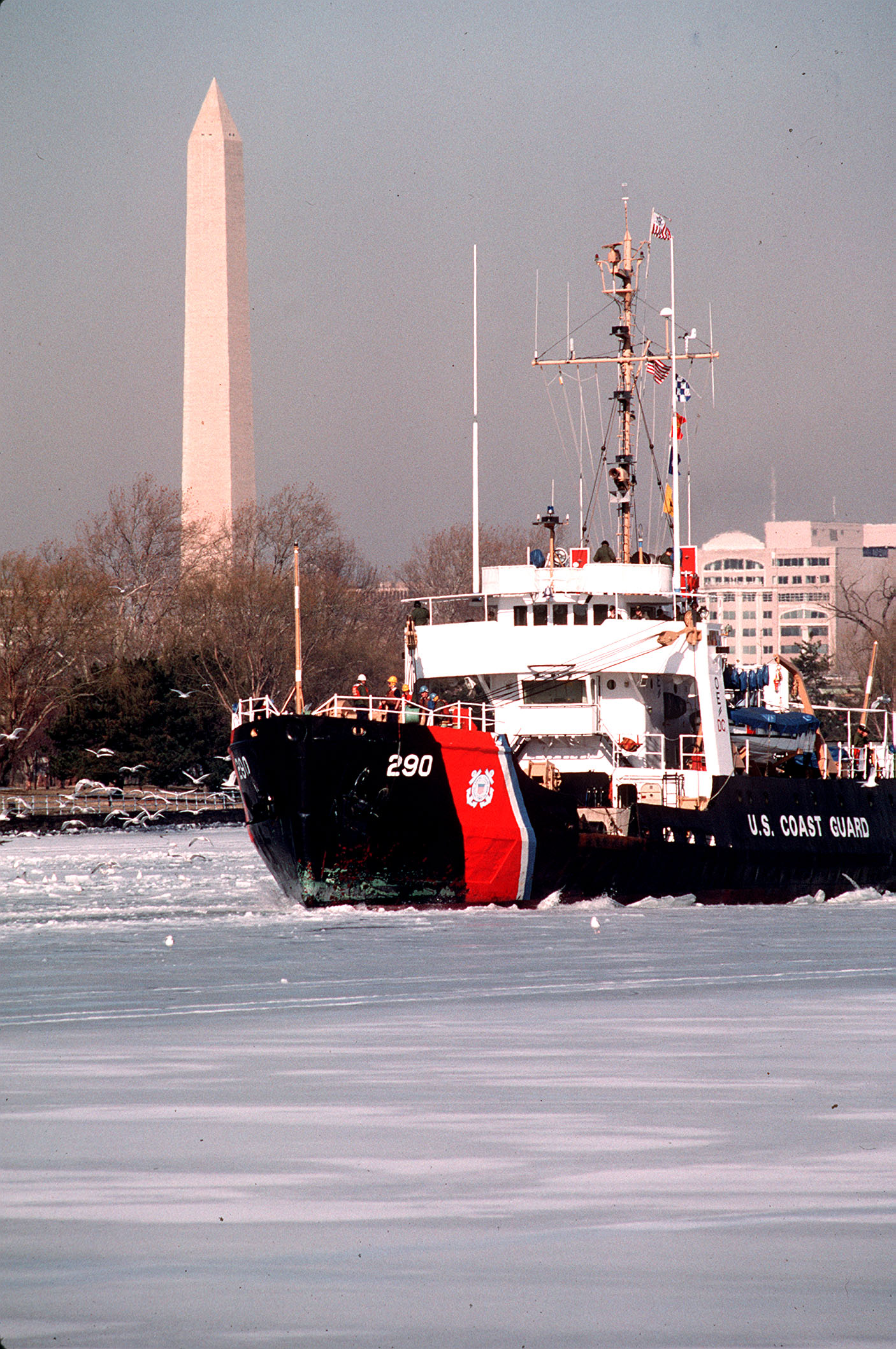
- Gentian breaks ice on the Potomac River.

History

United States
- Name: USCGC Gentian (WLB-290)
- Owner: United States Coast Guard
- Builder: Zenith Dredge Company
- Cost: $911,968
- Laid down: 3 October 1941
- Launched: 23 May 1942
- Commissioned: 3 November 1942 – 2 September 1976; 1983 – May 1998; September 1999 – 23 June 2006
- Reclassified: WIX-290 September 1999
- Fate: Transferred to the Colombian Navy on 15 October 2007

Colombia
- Name: ARC San Andrés (PO-45)
- Owner: Colombian Coast Guard
- Acquired: 15 October 2007
- Status: Active

General characteristics
- Class & type: 180-A
- Displacement: 935 fl (1945); 1,026 fl (1966); 700 light (1966)
- Length: 180 ft (55 m) LOA; 170 ft (52 m) between perpendiculars
- Beam: 37 ft 1 in (11.30 m)
- Draft: 12 ft (3.7 m); 14 ft 7 in (4.45 m) max
- Installed power: 2 × Westinghouse generators; 2 × Cooper-Bessemer-type GND-8, 4-cycle diesel engines
- Propulsion: 1 × electric motor; single screw; 1,000 shp (750 kW)
- Speed: 13 knots (24 km/h; 15 mph) sustained; 11 knots (20 km/h; 13 mph) economic
- Range: 12,000 mi (19,000 km) at 8.3 knots (15.4 km/h; 9.6 mph); 17,000 miles (27,000 km) at 12 knots (22 km/h; 14 mph)
- Complement: 6 officers, 74 enlisted (1945); 3 officers, 2 warrants, 42 enlisted (1962)
- Sensors & processing systems: Radar: BK (1943) SL (1945); SPS-23 (1966); Sonar: WEA-2 (1945); UNQ-1 (1966)
- Armament: 1945: 1 × 3 in (76 mm)/50 (single); 2 × 20 mm Oerlikon/80 (single); 2 × depth charge tracks; 2 × Mousetraps; 4 × Y-guns (1945); 1966: None

USCGC Gentian (WLB-290), a Cactus- or A-class buoy tender was built by Zenith Dredge of Duluth, Minnesota. Her keel was laid 3 October 1941, launched 23 May 1942, and commissioned 3 November 1942.

== Career ==
From December 1942 to January 1944 Gentian was stationed in New York. On 3 February 1944 Gentian was reassigned to Cape May, New Jersey and was used for maintaining navigational aids, search and rescue operations, annual ice breaking on the Hudson River, numerous tows of Coast Guard vessels to the Coast Guard Yard at Curtis Bay, Maryland and law enforcement. On 3 July 1948 she evacuated 42 persons from the disabled Swedish motor vessel Dagmar Salen, 20 miles (32 km) from the Overfalls lightship and extinguished an out-of-control engine room fire on the ship.

On 19 January 1949 Gentian assisted USCGC Eastwind (WAGB-279) when Eastwind struck by M.V. Gulfstream off Cape May, New Jersey.

On 26–28 May 1952 assisted following a collision between tanker Michael and motor barge A.C. Dodge in the Delaware River, on 18–21 December 1954 assisted following a collision between tanker Atlantic Capetown and the motor vessel Maya, and on 29 June 1953 assisted following a collision between motor vessels Gulftrader and Sol de Panama 4 miles (6.4 km) south of Barnegat Lightship.

On 1 October 1956 Gentian was transferred to Miami, Florida. On 29–30 September 1959 she assisted in the Hurricane Gracie evacuation of the coastal areas of Charleston, South Carolina and Savannah, Georgia and on 12–20 March 1960 participated in Operation Big Slam for drug interdiction.

On 15 July 1960 Gentian was transferred to Galveston, Texas. On 9 November 1961 while pursuing the FV Islander thought to be a drug smuggler, Islander turned and rammed Gentian trying to sink her. Islander sank while Gentian only sustained superficial damage and arrested Islander's crew. On 2 September 1976 Gentian was decommissioned and stored at the Coast Guard Yard, Curtis Bay, Md.

In the early 1980s Gentian had major renovations to machinery, living spaces and superstructure under the Service Life Extension Program (SLEP). New main General Motors diesels were installed, new generators, propulsion systems, central fluid power system, new vang supported boom system (eliminating the distinctive Cactus-class A-frame boom support), marine sanitation system, navigational electronics, and more. On 27 July 1983 the mostly brand new Gentian was assigned to Coast Guard Group Fort Macon, Atlantic Beach, North Carolina, and soon after served off the coast of Grenada during the US intervention. On 27 November 1984 she seized vessel Princess and 17.5 tons of marijuana, and in September 1989 assisted in the Hurricane Hugo evacuation of the coastal areas of Charleston, South Carolina.In 1994 served in Operation Able Manner and Uphold Democracy off the coast of Haiti.

In May 1998 Gentian's service as a black-hull buoy tender ended. She was temporarily decommissioned, repainted white and refurbished to facilitate longer periods of time at sea. Then in September 1999 she was recommissioned as WIX-290, and assigned to Miami, Florida where she trained sailors from all over the world. She was known as a Caribbean Support Tender and spent a great deal of time in the Caribbean. Gentian's final decommissioning came on 23 June 2006.

In March 2004, the Gentian was commanded by Cmdr. Joseph M. Vojvodich who would become the first Asian American flag officer in the USCG.

On 15 October 2007, she was transferred to Colombia and serves as ARC San Andrés (PO-45).
