= USCGC Eastwind =

1944 Wind-class icebreaker

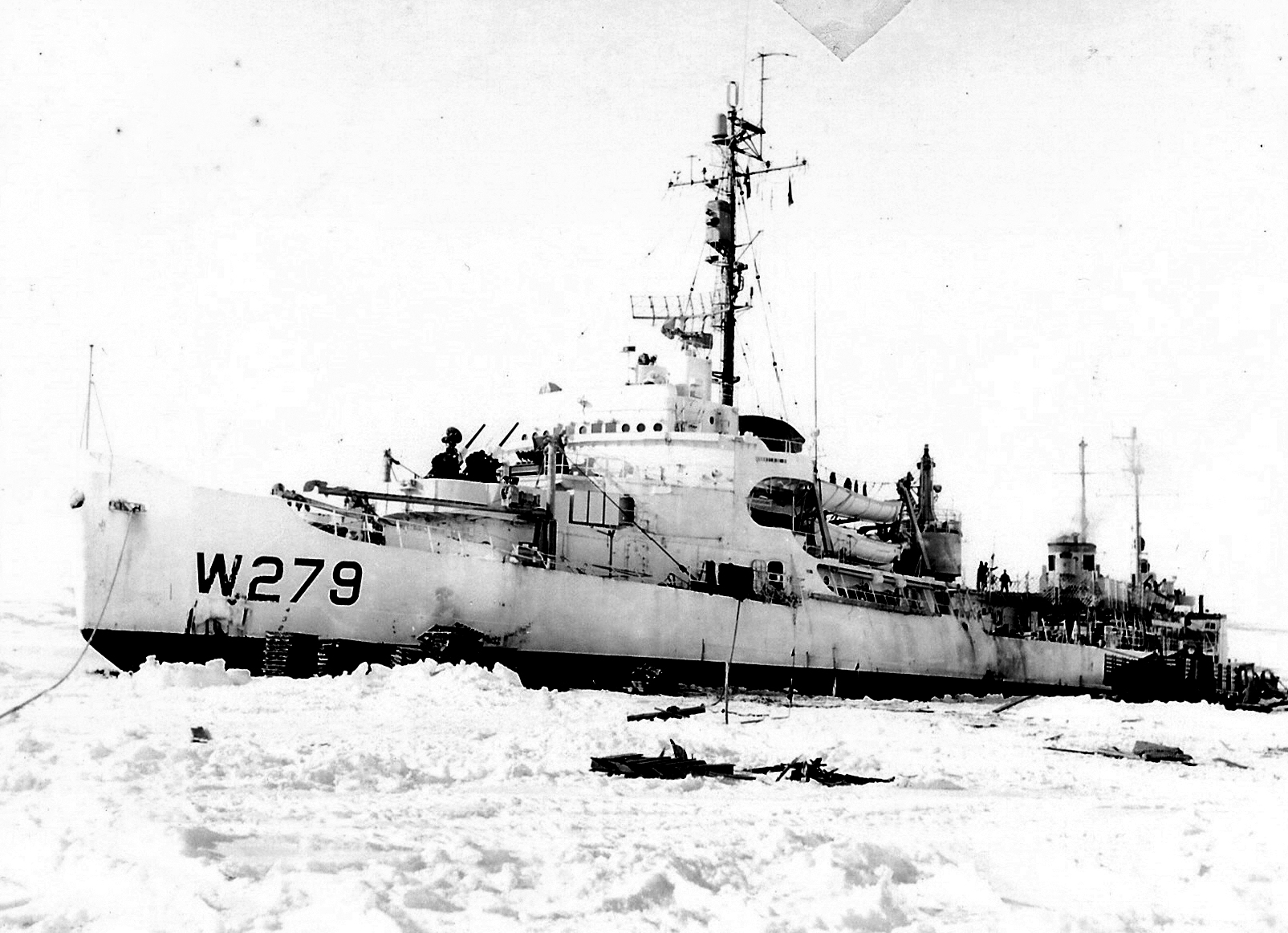

History

United States
- Operator: U.S. Coast Guard.
- Builder: Western Pipe and Steel Company, San Pedro, California
- Laid down: 23 June 1942.
- Launched: 3 June 1944.
- Commissioned: 1944.
- Decommissioned: 1968.
- Identification: WAG-279. WAGB-279.
- Nickname(s): Republic of Nantucket Cutter (RONC) Ice Brother.
- Fate: Sold for scrap, 1972
- Notes: USCG callsign: NRFB.

General characteristics
- Class & type: Coast Guard, Auxiliary, General, (WAG). Coast Guard, Auxiliary, General, (Ice) Breaker, (WAGB).
- Displacement: approx 6,515 tons full load.
- Length: 269 ft (82 m).
- Beam: 63.5 ft (19.4 m).
- Draft: 25.7 ft (7.8 m).
- Ice class: Wind class heavy icebreaker.
- Installed power: Diesel-electric: 6 × Fairbanks-Morse model 8-1/8OP, 10-cylinder opposed piston engines at 2,000 shp (1,500 kW), each driving a Westinghouse DC electric generator.
- Propulsion: 2 × Westinghouse Electric DC electric motors driving the 2 aft propellers, 1 × 3,000 shp (2,200 kW) Westinghouse DC electric motor driving the detachable and seldom used bow propeller.
- Speed: 16.8 knots.

USCGC Eastwind (WAGB-279) was a Wind-class icebreaker that was built for the United States Coast Guard. Completed in time to see action in World War II, she continued in USCG service under the same name until decommissioned in 1968.

== Construction ==
Eastwind was the second of five Wind-class of icebreakers built for the United States Coast Guard. Her keel was laid down on 23 June 1942 at Western Pipe and Steel Company shipyards in San Pedro. She was launched on 6 February 1943 and commissioned on 3 June 1944.

Wind-class icebreakers had hulls of unprecedented strength and structural integrity, with a relatively short length in proportion to the great power developed, a cut away forefoot, rounded bottom, and fore, aft and side heeling tanks. Diesel electric machinery was chosen for its controllability and resistance to damage.

Eastwind, along with the other Wind-class icebreakers, was heavily armed for an icebreaker because her design was crafted during World War II. Her main battery consisted of two twin-mount 5 in (130 mm) deck guns. Her anti-aircraft weaponry consisted of three quad-mounted Bofors 40 mm anti-aircraft autocannons and six Oerlikon 20 mm autocannons. She also carried six K-gun depth charge projectors and a Hedgehog as anti-submarine weapons. After the war her aft 5” mount was replaced by a helicopter deck, and by 1951 her forward mount had also been removed.

== History ==
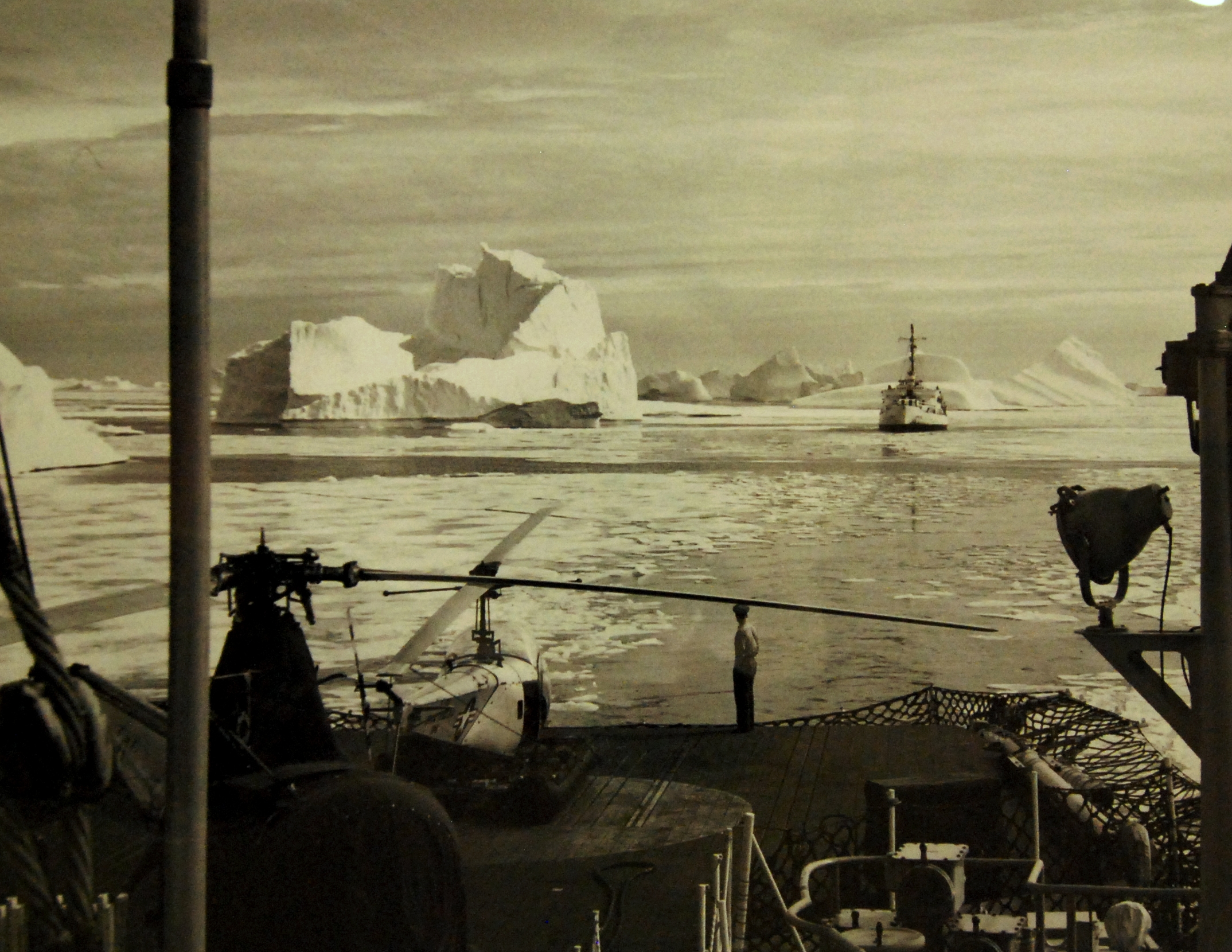
USCGC Eastwind in foreground during operations in Greenland fjord during 1952 with USCGC Northwind in distance

Eastwind ferried 200 US army troops which captured the last German weather station in Greenland, Edelweiss II, on 4 October 1944. She also seized the German trawler Externsteine, which was resupplying the base. Externsteine was later commissioned in the US Coast Guard as USCGC Eastbreeze and later commissioned as the US Navy ship USS Callao.

On 19 January 1949 Eastwind, underway from Boston, Massachusetts to Baltimore, Maryland was struck starboard amidships by the tanker SS Gulfstream sailing to the Persian Gulf from Philadelphia, Pennsylvania off of Cape May, New Jersey and severely damaged. The collision and resultant fire killed 13 crewmen. USCGC Gentian and USCGC Sassafras assisted Eastwind in firefighting and rescue operations.

In 1952, during an Arctic Cruise, for the first time were launched stratospheric balloons from the deck of the ship. The balloon carried scientific instruments to perform cosmic ray studies and rockoons, rockets to be launched once the balloon was in the stratosphere. Captain Oliver A. Peterson, Commanding.

In the Antarctic summer of 1955-1956 she participated in Antarctic exploration activities as part of Task Force 43 of Operation Deep Freeze. Crossing the Antarctic Circle on December 25, 1955, Captain Oliver A. Peterson, Commanding.

In October 1960, as part of Operation Deep Freeze, she departed Boston, passed through the Panama Canal, crossed the Pacific, visited New Zealand and McMurdo Sound. Leaving Antarctica, she traveled the Indian Ocean, came through the Suez Canal, crossed the Mediterranean Sea and the Atlantic Ocean to return home in May 1961. This tour made the Eastwind the first cutter ever to circumnavigate the globe. Two mountains in Antarctica, Mount Schmidtman and Mount Naab, were named after her captains during this period: Captain R.D. Schmidtman, USCG commanded the vessel in 1960, and Captain Joseph Naab, Jr., USCG commanded her during 1961 and 1962. In 1966 she left Boston MA in September for Operation Deep Freeze '67' returned April 1967. Captain William Benkert, Commanding.

In March and April 1968, CAPT C. William Bailey, Commanding, Eastwind entered the Great Lakes to aid with icebreaking duties, during a particularly severe ice winter. Her deep polar draft became problematic in the shallow Great Lakes, which required carrying minimal fuel (to lessen draft) and frequent refueling. Eastwind returned to Boston Spring 1968, and replenished for Arctic East Summer deployment.

In early June 1968, Eastwind departed Boston and participated in Arctic East Summer 1968, CAPT C. William Bailey, Commanding. After opening the shipping route to Thule AFB on July 4, 1968, Eastwind continued oceanographic studies in the Greenland Sea and Disko Island regions. Eastwind sailed into Sondestrom Fjord to measure calving glacier outfalls. Later in Disko Bay (Bugt) a propeller shaft bearing started to separate. The shaft was clamped and the ship limped back to Boston mid-Summer 1968, on one propeller shaft, for drydock repairs in East Boston. This negated a planned liberty port call in Edinburgh, Scotland. Eastwind departed Boston 3 weeks later and returned to salvage the remaining Arctic-East summer navigation season in the Greenland Sea. Returning to Boston in early November, Eastwind departed Boston mid-November 1968 and traveled to the USCG Yard at Curtis Bay, Baltimore. She was Decommissioned early Dec 1968, and remained mothballed at Curtis Bay with a caretaker crew, until being sold for scrap.

In 1972 she was sold for scrap and last seen at the breaking yards in New Jersey in 1976 or 1977.
