= USCGC Sassafras =

C-class buoy tender, 1943-2003 (now NNS Obula)

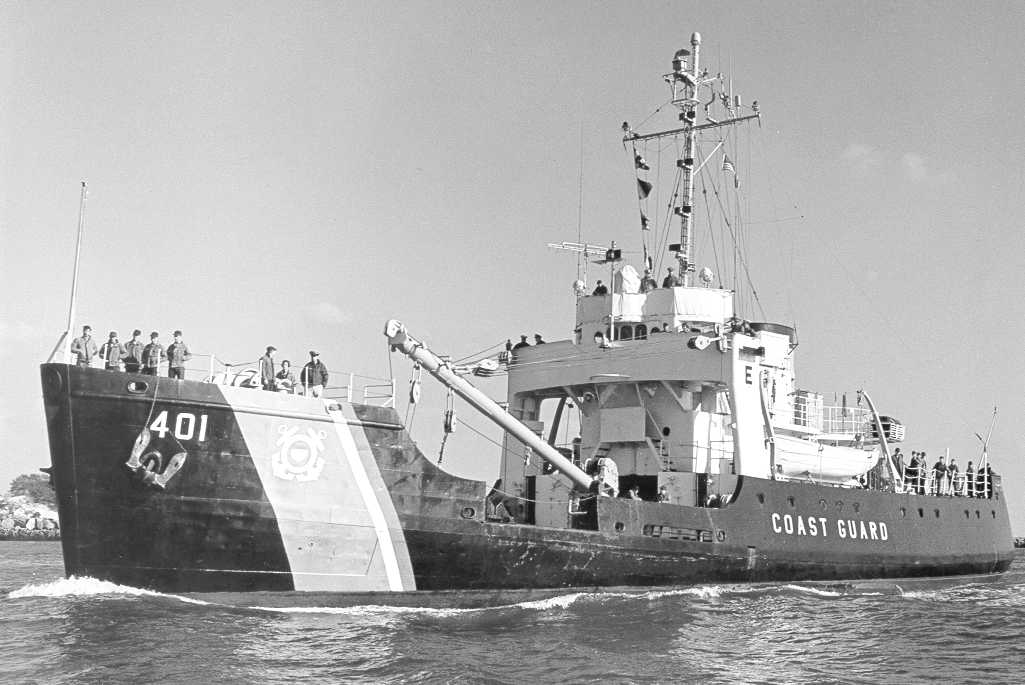
- USCGC Sassafras, 1967.

History

United States
- Laid down: 16 August 1943
- Launched: 5 October 1943
- Commissioned: 23 May 1944
- Decommissioned: 31 October 2003
- Motto: Mare Laboramus
- Nickname(s): Sass
- Fate: Transferred to the Federal Republic of Nigeria

Nigeria
- Name: NNS Obula (A 504)
- Commissioned: 2003
- Identification: MMSI number: 657711000
- Status: In service

General characteristics
- Class & type: Iris (C)
- Displacement: 1,025 long tons (1,041 t)
- Length: 180 ft (55 m)
- Beam: 37 ft (11 m)
- Draft: 12 ft (3.7 m)
- Propulsion: 2 × Westinghouse generators driven by 2 Cooper-Bessemer GND8 diesel engines
- Speed: 13.5 kn (25.0 km/h; 15.5 mph) maximum
- Range: 12,000 nmi (22,000 km; 14,000 mi)
- Complement: 48
- Armament: 2 × .50 cal

Sassafras is a C-Class, 180-foot (55 m), seagoing buoy tender constructed for the United States Coast Guard by Marine Iron & Shipbuilding Corp. of Duluth, Minnesota. Sassafras was one of 39 tenders commissioned for duties that would include aids-to-navigation, ice breaking, search-and-rescue, firefighting, law enforcement, providing fuel and potable water, and assistance to the National Oceanographic and Seismographic Survey.

== History ==
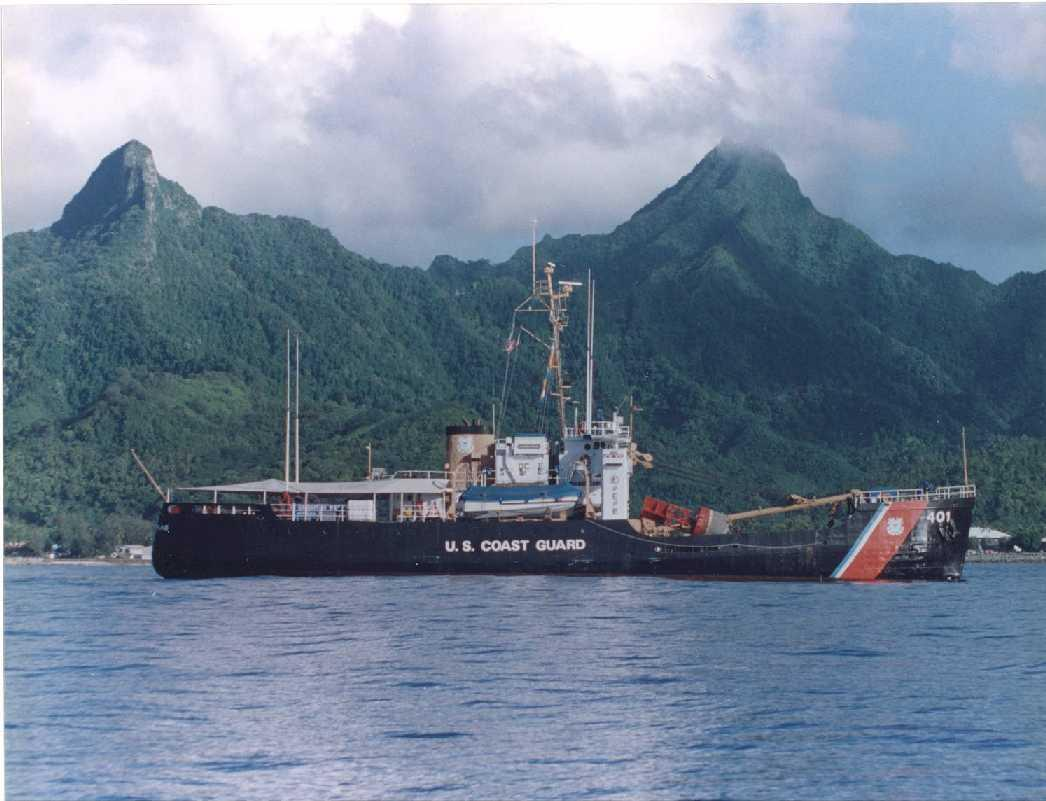
USCGC Sassafras off Manua Islands, American Samoa

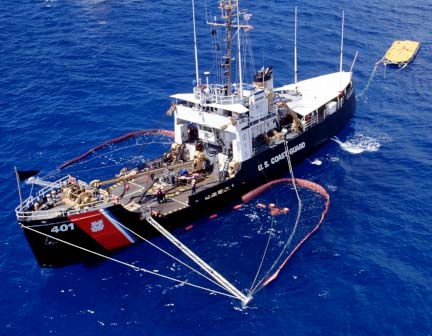
USCGC SASSAFRAS VOSS

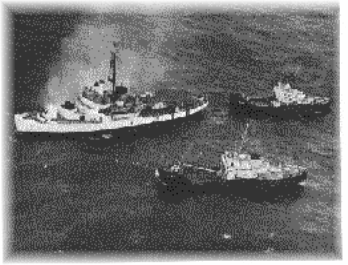
USCGC Eastwind

1943 - 16 August. Keel laid at Duluth, Minnesota.

1943 - 5 October. Launched Superior Bay.

1944 - 23 May. Commissioned as USCGC Sassafras (WAGL-401).

1945 - 15 April. Homeported San Francisco, California.

1946 - 23 August. Left San Francisco for new homeport of Honolulu, Hawaii.

1946-47 - Assisted the Seventh Fleet involved in wartime operations in the Philippines.

1947 - 22 August. Left Honolulu for new homeport of Cape May, New Jersey.

1949 - Assisted USCGC Eastwind after she was severely damaged in a collision with MV Gulfstream on 19 January 1949 off Cape May, New Jersey.

1957 - 4 September. Assisted after a mid-air collision between two USAF F-89 aircraft in Delaware Bay.

1965 - Hull Classification Symbol changed to WLB.

1967 - On 30 April 1967, Sassafras rescued five from FV Mockingbird, which sank 130 miles (210 km) SE of New York City.

1969 - 12 January. Grounded on a pinnacle in the Hudson River, north of Bear Mountain Bridge; she was re-floated four days later.

1977-78 - Underwent a "major renovation" at the Coast Guard Yard. The "major renovation" program was conducted on the following 180-foot tenders between 1974 and 1979: Sedge, Bramble, Ironwood, Mariposa, Acacia, Sweetbrier, Hornbeam, Spar, Sassafras, Sundew, Firebush, and Woodrush. This renovation involved the complete removal and overhaul of all mechanical systems including the main engines and the propulsion switchboard. A bow thruster was also added. The tenders were then recabled, repiped, and all habitability spaces were renovated, and the forward hold was redesigned to increase berthing space.

1978 - Moved homeport to Governors Island, New York.

1981 - Returned to Honolulu, Hawaii.

1986 - 5 December. Rescued two people from the sailboat Joie de Mar, which was disabled 550 miles (890 km) southwest of Honolulu, Hawaii.

1989 - February. Assisted after United Airlines Flight 811 accident off Hawaii.

1989-90 - MCI Ship Yard in Bellingham, Washington. Major renovations and replacement of Main Diesel Engine's and major auxiliary systems during a 7-month yard period. Removing the Cooper-Bessemer Engines and replacing with General Motors Diesel plant.

1990 - Rescued 28 crewmen from sinking Greek freighter (Vulca) 800 miles (1,300 km) northeast of Hawaii.

1998 - Moved homeport to Apra Harbor, Guam, to replace the USCGC Basswood (WLB-388).

2003 - Decommissioned after 59 years of service. Transferred to the Federal Republic of Nigeria, to continue service as the Nigerian Naval Ship Obula.

The Sassafras was named after a type of tree, most famous for flavoring root beer. All of the 180s were named after trees, shrubs, or flowers. This was a continuation of the longstanding Lighthouse Service practice of naming tenders after foliage found in the tender’s intended area of operations. For the 180s, however, there was no particular area of operations envisioned for individual vessels.

== References and links ==
- "USCG Historian Factsheet - CGC Sassafras" (PDF). United States Coast Guard. Archived from the original (PDF) on 18 October 2012.
- "Historical Context and Statement of Significance Cactus, Mesquite, and Basswood Classes United States Coast Guard 180-foot Buoy Tenders". United States Coast Guard.
- Photo history of USCG buoy tenders by the Coast Guard Historian's Office
- "WWII Construction Records U.S. Coast Guard Cutters (WAG, WPG, WAGL, WYT)". Archived from the original on 21 September 2006.
- Wess Wessling's U.S. Coast Guard Patch Archive
- A story of the Eastwind
- Scheina, Robert L. (1990). U.S. Coast Guard Cutter and Craft 1946-1990. United States Coast Guard. Annapolis, Maryland: Naval Institute Press.
