= William Harrison =

William Harrison may refer to:

- William Henry Harrison (1773–1841), ninth president of the United States in 1841

== Politicians ==
- William Harrison (Canadian politician) (1834–1922), saddlemaker, historian and reeve of Richmond Hill, Ontario
- William Harrison (MP) (baptised 1619 –1643), English Member of Parliament and Royalist soldier
- William Harrison Jr. (c. 1750–1789), delegate for Maryland in the U.S. Continental Congress of 1786 and 1787
- William A. Harrison (1795–1870), Virginia politician, West Virginia founder and Supreme Court Justice
- William Alistair Harrison (born 1954), governor of Anguilla
- William B. Harrison (1889–1948), mayor of Louisville, Kentucky
- William C. Harrison, chairman of North Carolina board of education
- William H. Harrison (Wyoming politician) (1894–1991), Wyoming politician in the state house of representatives
- William Henry Harrison III (1896–1990), American politician who served as a Republican U.S. representative from Wyoming
- William Henry Harrison (Canadian politician) (1880–1955), Canadian politician in the Legislative Assembly of New Brunswick
- William Henry Harrison (Georgia politician) (fl. 1843–1871), state legislator from Hancock County, Georgia
- William Henry Harrison (New Zealand politician) (1831–1879), New Zealand politician
- Bill Harrison (politician), mayor of Fremont, California

== Sportsmen ==
=== Association football (soccer) ===
- William Harrison (footballer, born 1858) (1858–1890), English footballer
- William Harrison (Welsh footballer) (1872–1920), Wrexham F.C. and Wales international footballer
- Billy Harrison (footballer, born 1886) (William Ewart Harrison, 1886–1948), English football player
- Billy Harrison (footballer, born 1901) (William Harrison, 1901–1984), English football player

=== Cricket ===
- William Harrison (cricketer, born 1838) (1838–1912), English cricketer and British Army officer
- William Harrison (cricketer, born 1866) (William Henry Harrison, 1866–1936), English cricketer
- William Hendy Harrison (1863–1939), English cricketer
- William Harrison (cricketer, born 1875) (1875–1937), English cricketer and High Sheriff of Staffordshire

=== Other sports ===
- Bill Harrison (ice hockey), American ice hockey coach
- Billy Harrison (Australian footballer) (1884–1964), Australian rules footballer
- Billy Harrison (rugby league) (William Rapihana Harrison, 1938–2021), rugby league footballer of the 1960s for New Zealand, and Wellington
- Will Harrison (rugby union) (born 1999), Australian fly-half

== Clergymen ==
- William Harrison (Archpriest of England) (c. 1553–1621), English Roman Catholic priest
- William Harrison (bishop) (1837–1920), Anglican bishop
- William Harrison (priest) (1534–1593), English clergyman and author
- William P. Harrison (1830–1895), Methodist minister and theologian, Chaplain of the United States House of Representatives

== Servicemen ==
- William Harrison (sea captain) (1812–1860), British merchant navy officer
- William H. Harrison (USMC) (1896–1955), United States Marine Corps general
- William Hardin Harrison (1933–2024), U.S. Army lieutenant general
- William Kelly Harrison (1870–1928), U.S. Navy officer and Medal of Honor recipient
- William Kelly Harrison Jr. (1895–1987), U.S. Army officer
- William Leeming Harrison (1897–1960), Canadian fighter ace in World War I

== Businessmen ==
- William B. Harrison Jr. (born 1943), former chairman and CEO of JP Morgan Chase
- William Henry Harrison (businessman) (1892–1956), American general and businessman
- William Welsh Harrison (1850–1927), American businessman
- William Harrison (businessman) (born 1986), Texas businessman

== Writers ==
- William Harrison (antiquary) (1802–1884), English antiquarian writer on the history of the Isle of Man
- William Harrison (author) (1933–2013), author of "Roller Ball Murder" and the screenplay for Rollerball
- William Harrison (poet) (1685–1713), English poet and diplomat

== Other ==
- William Harrison (instrument maker) (1728–1815), son of John Harrison, inventor of the chronometer
- William Harrison (physician) (1935–2010), American obstetrician
- William Harrison (singer) (1813–1868), English tenor and opera impresario
- William B. Harrison (Alamo defender) (1811–1836), Texas soldier
- William Harrison (vegetarian) (1836–1914), English industrialist, activist, and writer
- William Greer Harrison (1836–1916), member of the Committee of Fifty after the 1906 San Francisco earthquake
- William Jerome Harrison (1845–1908), British geologist, science writer, and amateur photographer
- William Henry Harrison (architect) (1897–1988), American architect in California
- "Victim" of a 1660 murder found alive two years later; see The Campden Wonder
- Grancer Harrison (1789–1860), plantation owner whose alleged ghost has been the subject of several stories
- Will Harrison (actor) (born 1996), American actor
- William Tyler Harrison (glassblower) (born 1998)

== See also ==
- William Henry Harrison (disambiguation)
