= William Henry Harrison (disambiguation) =

William Henry Harrison (1773–1841) was the ninth president of the United States in 1841.

William Henry Harrison may also refer to:

- William Henry Harrison (New Zealand politician) (1831–1879)
- William Henry Harrison (Georgia politician) (fl. 1843–1871), African-American representative in the Georgia Legislature during the Reconstruction Era
- William Henry Harrison (cricketer) (1866–1936), English cricketer
- William Henry Harrison (Canadian politician) (1880–1955)
- William Henry Harrison (businessman) (1892–1956), American general
- William Henry Harrison III (1896–1990), American representative and Indiana and Wyoming state legislator
- William Henry Harrison (architect) (1897–1988), American architect in California
- William H. Harrison (Wyoming politician) (1894–1991), Wyoming state representative

== See also ==
- William Harrison (disambiguation)
- William Henry Harrison Seeley (1840–1914), first American recipient of the Victoria Cross
- William Hendy Harrison (1863–1939), cricketer
