= Rocky Hill Castle =

Former plantation near Town Creek, Alabama

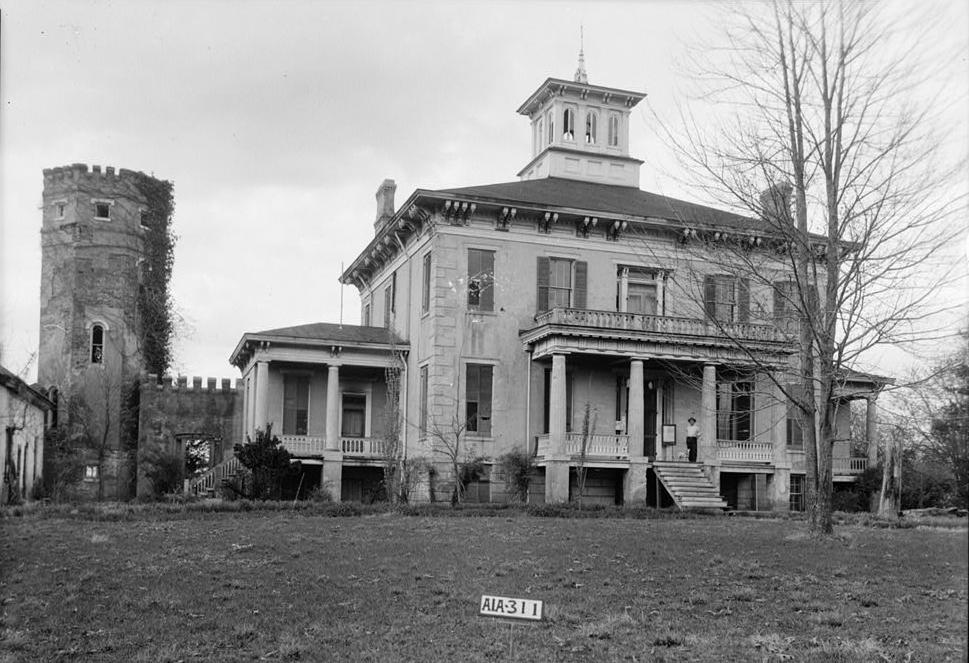
- Rocky Hill Castle in 1935. It was demolished in 1961 and a new house built on the site.

- Location within Alabama
- 34.6834905°N 87.3643593°W
- Location: Courtland, Alabama

History
- Founded: mid-1820s
- Built: 1858–1861
- Built for: James Edmonds Saunders
- Demolished: 1961

Site notes
- Architectural styles: Greek Revival, Italianate and Gothic Revival
- Governing body: Private

Rocky Hill Castle, also known simply as Rocky Hill, was a historic plantation and plantation house between Town Creek and Courtland, Alabama, United States. Once famed in Alabama for its architecture, it was an unusual mixing of neoclassical and picturesque aesthetics in one plantation complex. The house and tower suffered from neglect during much of the 20th century and were subsequently demolished in the 1960s. Much folklore surrounds the site, with Rocky Hill Castle being the subject of numerous ghost stories. The most notable story, "The Ghost of the Angry Architect", was published in Kathryn Tucker Windham and Margaret Gillis Figh's 1969 work 13 Alabama Ghosts and Jeffrey.

== History ==
The plantation at Rocky Hill Castle was founded by James Edmonds Saunders in the mid-1820s, shortly after he and his wife came to Alabama from their native Georgia. Saunders, born on May 7, 1806, was a planters and attorney.

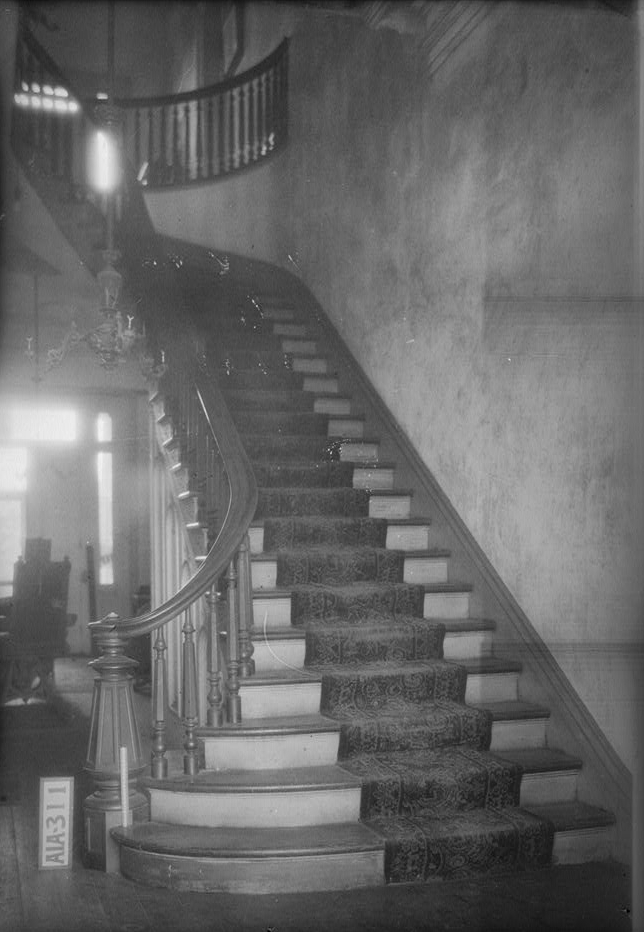
The main staircase in the entrance hall

He established his plantation 4 miles (6.4 km) from that of his father, Turner Saunders, and his Saunders Hall plantation. In the years after coming to Lawrence County Saunders practiced law in nearby Courtland. He eventually amassed 640 acres (260 ha), centered on the hill that his house sat upon.

Desiring a grander dwelling, Saunders demolished this earlier house and began building Rocky Hill Castle in 1858. The American Civil War put an end to construction in 1861, although the estate was largely complete by that time. The house served as a Confederate hospital during the war, with several soldiers buried nearby in the Saunders' family cemetery.

The plantation passed through many owners following the death of James Saunders in 1896. The last Saunders to own it was James Saunder's grandson, Dudley Saunders. Saunders and his family are alleged to have abruptly abandoned Rocky Hill Castle in the 1920s, purportedly after ghostly activity.

Regardless of the accuracy of those events, the plantation was purchased from Saunders in the 1920s by H. D. Bynum and R. E. Tweedy, who used the farmland but did not reside in the house. This started a long period of decline for the house, which eventually became ruinous. It was finally demolished by a new owner, Gordon McBride, in 1961, after he and his wife had salvaged what they could for their new house in Decatur. A modern home was later built on the site by the Cross family.

== Architecture ==
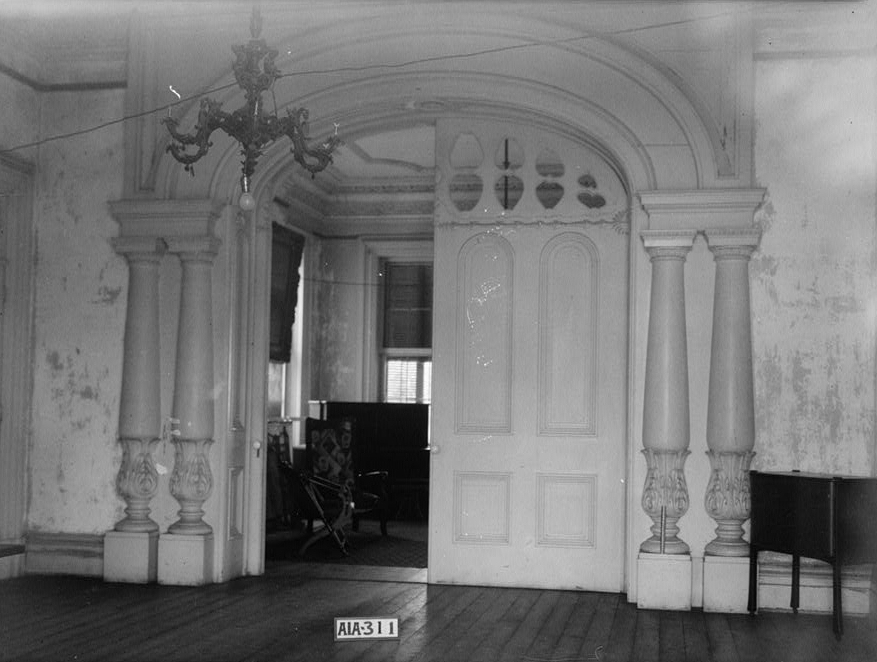
Doors between the double parlors

Rocky Hill Castle was built from 1858 to 1861, utilizing a combination of the Greek Revival and Italianate architectural styles. The architect of the main house is unknown, although at least one of the ghost stories alleges that it was a gentleman of French extraction. The two-story house was a rectangular stuccoed brick structure over a raised basement. It featured one-story side wings, one-story Doric porticoes centered on the front and rear, and was topped by a large cupola.

Connected to the house complex on the western side by a high brick wall was a five-story brick Gothic Revival tower crowned with crenelation. The connecting wall was pierced by a Tudor arch. The wall and octagonal tower have been traditionally linked to an itinerant craftsman from Wales, Hugh Jones. The tower, as well as the adjoining brick kitchen building, contained rooms used to house the Saunders' slaves.

The interior of the house featured some of the most elaborate woodwork and plasterwork in the state. Other features of the house were an impressive walnut staircase, double parlors and Italian marble mantles.

== Folklore ==
Purported paranormal activity at Rocky Hill Castle included knocking and banging of unknown origin, a ghostly "lady in blue", ghosts of Civil War soldiers and the ghosts of tortured slaves.

== See also ==
- List of plantations in the United States
- Reportedly haunted locations in Alabama
