= Kinston, Alabama =

- Town
- Location of Kinston in Coffee County, Alabama.
- Coordinates: 31°13′12″N 86°10′14″W
- Country: United States
- State: Alabama
- County: Coffee
- Established: 1878
- Incorporated: 1920

Area
  - Total: 4.916 sq mi (12.732 km^{2})
  - Land: 4.892 sq mi (12.671 km^{2})
  - Water: 0.024 sq mi (0.062 km^{2})
- Elevation: 276 ft (84 m)

Population (2020)
  - Total: 580
  - Estimate (2023): 595
  - Density: 121.6/sq mi (46.96/km^{2})
- Time zone: UTC−6 (Central)
  - Summer (DST): UTC−5 (CDT)
- ZIP Code: 36453
- Area code: 334
- FIPS code: 01-40096
- GNIS feature ID: 2405954
- Sales tax: 9.0%
- Website: townofkinstonal.gov

Kinston is a town in Coffee County, Alabama, United States. The population was 580 at the 2020 census. It is part of the Enterprise Micropolitan Statistical Area.

== History ==
On March 10, 2009, a disgruntled worker, identified as Michael McLendon murdered ten people in Kinston, Samson and nearby community, Geneva; the event sparked a controversy when soldiers from nearby Fort Rucker were deployed to patrol the local streets.

== Geography ==
Kinston is located in the southwest corner of Coffee County at 31°12′58″N 86°10′16″W (31.2160045, -86.1710579).

According to the United States Census Bureau, the city has a total area of 4.916 square miles (12.73 km^{2}), of which 4.892 square miles (12.67 km^{2}) is land and 0.024 square miles (0.06 km^{2}) is water.

== Demographics ==
Historical population
Census	Pop.	Note	%±
1930	388		—
1940	343		−11.6%
1950	312		−9.0%
1960	470		50.6%
1970	540		14.9%
1980	604		11.9%
1990	595		−1.5%
2000	602		1.2%
2010	540		−10.3%
2020	580		7.4%
2023 (est.)	595	▲	2.6%
U.S. Decennial Census; 2020 Census

=== Racial and ethnic composition ===
Kinston town, Alabama – Racial and ethnic composition Note: the US Census treats Hispanic/Latino as an ethnic category. This table excludes Latinos from the racial categories and assigns them to a separate category. Hispanics/Latinos may be of any race.
Race / Ethnicity (NH = Non-Hispanic)	Pop 2000	Pop 2010	Pop 2020	% 2000	% 2010	% 2020
White alone (NH)	561	511	536	93.19%	94.63%	92.41%
Black or African American alone (NH)	1	1	1	0.17%	0.19%	0.17%
Native American or Alaska Native alone (NH)	7	11	6	1.16%	2.04%	1.03%
Asian alone (NH)	1	3	3	0.17%	0.56%	0.52%
Native Hawaiian or Pacific Islander alone (NH)	0	0	0	0.00%	0.00%	0.00%
Other race alone (NH)	0	0	2	0.00%	0.00%	0.34%
Mixed race or Multiracial (NH)	30	9	23	4.98%	1.67%	3.97%
Hispanic or Latino (any race)	2	5	9	0.33%	0.93%	1.55%
Total	602	540	580	100.00%	100.00%	100.00%

=== 2020 census ===
As of the 2020 census, there were 580 people, 249 households, 177 families residing in the town.

=== 2010 census ===
As of the 2010 census, there were 540 people, 227 households, _ families residing in the town.

=== 2000 census ===
As of the 2000 census, there were 602 people, 257 households, and 168 families residing in the town. The population density was 123.4 inhabitants per square mile (47.6/km^{2}). There were 309 housing units at an average density of 63.4 inhabitants per square mile (24.5/km^{2}). The racial makeup of the town was 93.52% White, 0.17% African American, 1.16% Native American, 0.17% Asian, 0.0% Pacific Islander, and 4.98% from two or more races. 0.33% of the population were Hispanic or Latino of any race.

There were 257 households, out of which 30.0% had children under the age of 18 living with them, 49.8% were married couples living together, 12.5% had a female householder with no husband present, and 34.6% were non-families. 33.1% of all households were made up of individuals, and 19.8% had someone living alone who was 65 years of age or older. The average household size was 2.34 and the average family size was 2.99.

In the town, the population was spread out, with 24.8% under the age of 18, 7.6% from 18 to 24, 26.6% from 25 to 44, 23.4% from 45 to 64, and 17.6% who were 65 years of age or older. The median age was 39 years. For every 100 females, there were 87.0 males. For every 100 females age 18 and over, there were 79.8 males.

The median income for a household in the town was $30,875, and the median income for a family was $36,250. Males had a median income of $24,750 versus $16,838 for females. The per capita income for the town was $14,738. About 10.1% of families and 17.6% of the population were below the poverty line, including 21.5% of those under age 18 and 22.9% of those age 65 or over.

== Education ==
Kinston is home to Kinston High School, whose mascot is the Bulldogs. In 1966 and 1968 the Bulldogs won the Alabama High School Athletic Association Class A state basketball tournament. They won the state title again in 1981.

== Notable people ==
- Dean Daughtry, keyboard player
- Annette Shelby, academic

== Legend ==
- The Dancing Ghost of Grancer Harrison, legendary spirit featured in the book 13 Alabama Ghosts and Jeffrey
