= Eastleigh to Salisbury line =

The Eastleigh to Salisbury line is the railway line from Eastleigh (Hampshire) through Romsey to Salisbury (Wiltshire) in England. It was constructed by the London and South Western Railway in 1857 from Bishopstoke; the station's name was changed to Eastleigh in 1889. At Salisbury the line ran to Milford station on the south-eastern margin of the city, but in 1859 an extension to the present-day Salisbury station was built, and the lines from Andover through Salisbury to Yeovil were connected.

In 1865 the Andover and Redbridge Railway was opened, giving a direct connection from Southampton to Romsey, and in 1889 the missing link from Netley to Romsey was ready. In time this became the dominant route to Southampton, and the Eastleigh to Romsey section was greatly reduced in importance.

The route to Salisbury carried through trains from Bristol and South Wales, and became an important artery from South Wales for bunker coal for coal-fuelled shipping at Southampton and Portsmouth. Except for the Milford station, the entire route continues in use at the present.

== Before the LSWR ==
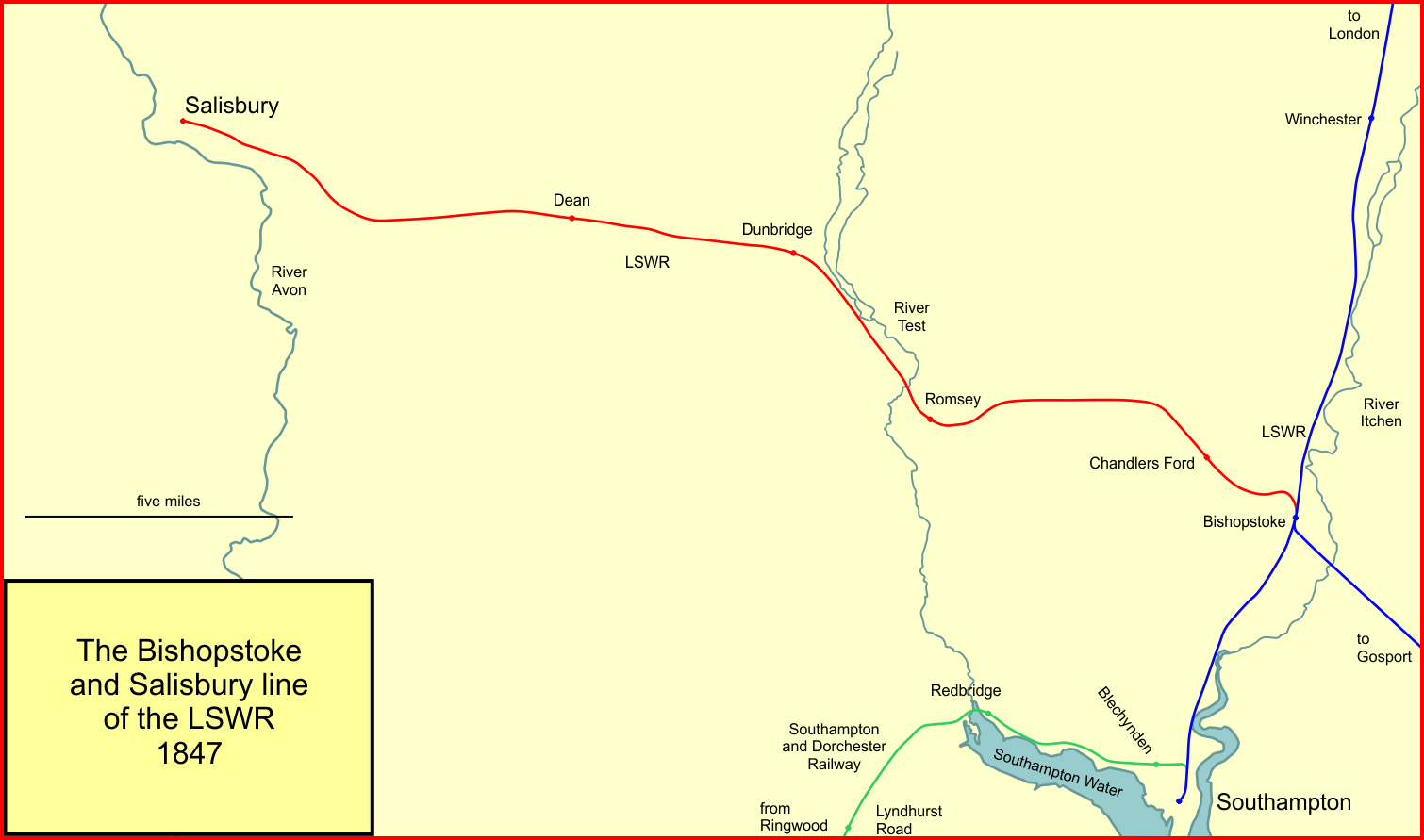
The Bishopstoke to Salisbury line in 1847

In the eighteenth century, the city of Salisbury recognised the need for transport for heavy commodities to and from the port of Southampton, and construction of a canal was attempted. A flood destroyed much of the works and bankrupted the contractor, and the scheme was at an end. In 1803 a wooden railway was partly built, but this too was unsuccessful. Yet already in the 1830s a railway connection was seen as essential to the commercial success and prosperity of a town or city, and the idea of a railway line was always in mind.

The London and Southampton Railway opened its line throughout in 1840. The following year it changed its name to the London and South Western Railway in response to sensitivities in Portsmouth, which was to be denied a proper branch at first. Portsmouth had to make do with a line to Gosport, and crossing Portsmouth Harbour by ferry. The Gosport branch opened in 1841.

=== LSWR to Salisbury ===
The LSWR promoted a Bishopstoke and Salisbury branch, which was authorised by Act of Parliament on 4 July 1844. Bishopstoke is now known as Eastleigh. The topography of Salisbury is difficult, and the branch line was planned to terminate at Milford, in the south-eastern margin of the city. The LSWR was not alone in looking at Salisbury as a worthwhile destination, for the Wilts, Somerset and Weymouth Railway was authorised in the following year, on 30 June 1845. Its main line was to be from near Chippenham, on the London to Bristol main line of the Great Western Railway, to Weymouth. There would be a branch line from Westbury to Salisbury. The WS&WR was an affiliate of the GWR, and was to be built on the broad gauge.

Soon, the GWR and its allies, as well as the LSWR, started to plan extensions involving Salisbury, some involving very long transits east and west. At this period a huge number of railway schemes were being promoted, in a frenzy referred to as the Railway Mania. Many of the schemes were impracticable or incapable of economic success, and the Government appointed a committee under Lord Dalhousie to sift them. However, the committee's recommendations carried little traction, and the LSWR soon promoted a line referred to as the Basingstoke and Salisbury Extension, which was authorised on 13 August 1846. The line would run to the Milford station of the (unbuilt) Bishopstoke to Salisbury branch.

Meanwhile, construction of the Bishopstoke to Salisbury line proceeded, although the demands of agricultural harvesting presented a competing employment opportunity for local labourers. On 23 February 1847, Captain J Coddington made an official inspection for the Board of Trade. His only reservation was that two bridges had not had their centres removed, so making it impossible for him to investigate their stability. He noted that although the line was being built as a double track, a mile or so of the line remained single about three miles short of Salisbury, because a deep cutting had not yet been widened to accommodate a second track. He proposed a safety measure: "The precaution to be adopted over this portion is a symbol (such as a particularly painted board), which is to be kept on the spot and without which no engine can enter the single line – this will ensure safety from collision."

The line opened to passengers on 1 March 1847, having opened to goods and mineral trains on 27 January 1847. There were five trains each way every weekday, with two on Sundays. Stations were at Chandlers Ford, Romsey, Dean, Dunbridge and Salisbury. The South Western's Salisbury terminus, at Milford, was a single platform 350-foot (110 m) long with an engine shed and substantial goods yard.

=== Salisbury ===
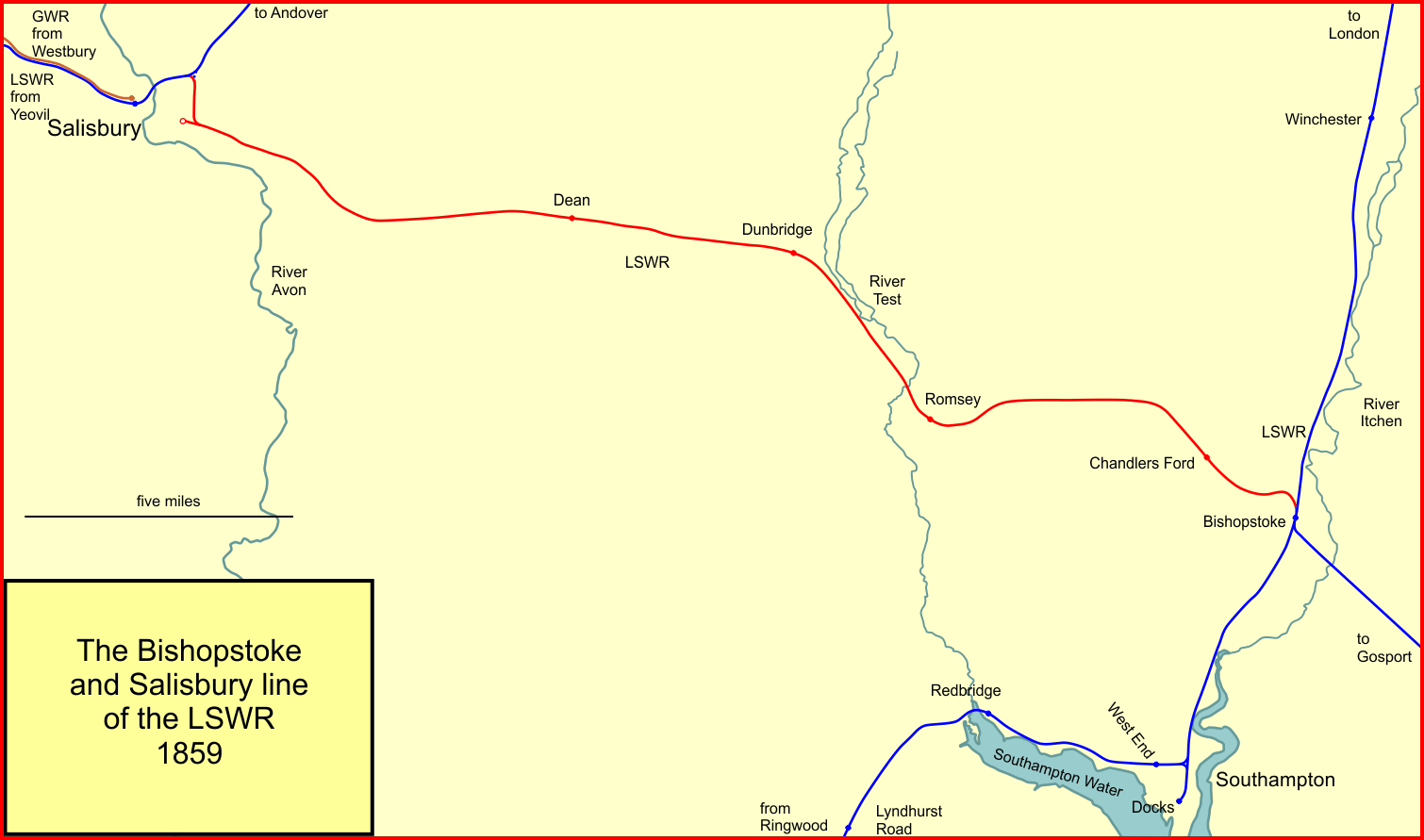
The Bishopstoke to Salisbury line in 1859

The LSWR Basingstoke & Salisbury Extension (BSE), reached Salisbury on 1 May 1857. Approaching Salisbury, the BSE line turned sharply south and joined the Bishopstoke & Salisbury branch at a junction south of Milford, facing Romsey. Trains from the Andover and Basingstoke direction therefore ran past Milford to the junction, and then reversed in to the Milford terminus.

The awkward operation of trains between Milford and the Andover direction lasted for two years, and was simplified on opening of the new Fisherton Street station on 2 May 1859. The company was planning to build a through station more conveniently located in Fisherton Street. This had been allowed for in the 1844 Act, and enabled a connection into the Salisbury and Yeovil Railway, which had been authorised on 7 August 1854. It involved constructing a 443-yard tunnel through the high ground east of Salisbury, and was now being built. In the event, the new line from the approach curve at Milford from the Andover line, into the new Fisherton Street station, was authorised to the Salisbury and Yeovil Railway.

On Saturday 27 March 1858, the Milford passenger station buildings were destroyed by a fire. It was discovered in a waiting room by station staff shortly after 22:00. It spread rapidly to the whole building, and despite urgent efforts, it proved impossible to save the building, which was completely destroyed. As the new station was under construction, a basic temporary station was built at Milford after the fire.

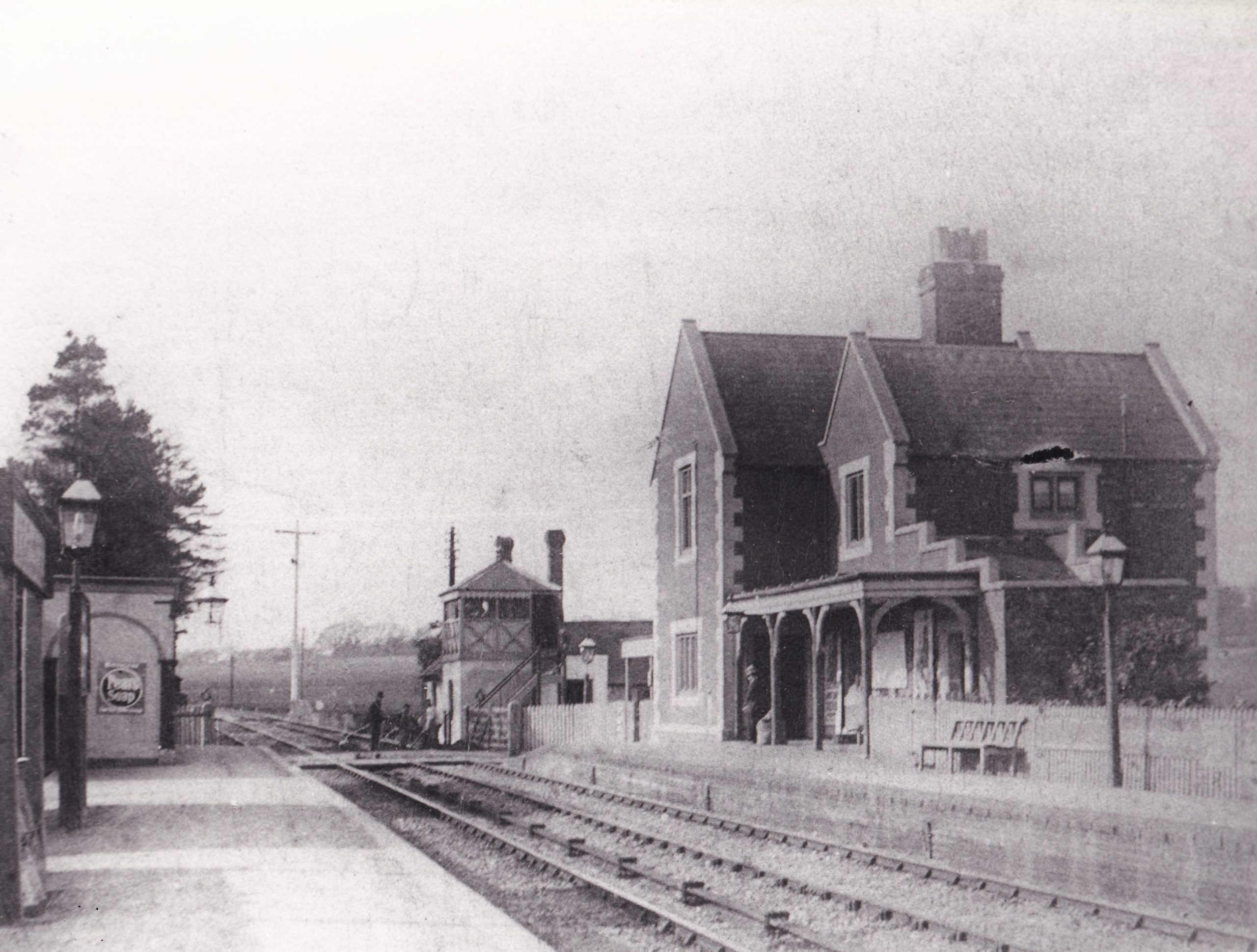
Dunbridge station 1895

The new Salisbury station, at Fisherton Street, opened on 2 May 1859; the line from Andover was opened on the same day, as was the Salisbury and Yeovil line. The curve taking Andover trains sharply south to Milford was closed at the same time, (Note: Sands says that there was never a junction at the Andover apex.) and Bishopstoke trains used the new station from that day; the Andover and Bishopstoke lines converged at Tunnel Junction.

The Great Western Railway had opened its Wilts, Somerset and Weymouth station at Fisherton Street on 30 June 1856, but for the time being the two networks did not connect; the GWR line was broad gauge.

=== Romsey ===
Romsey was simply a wayside station when the Salisbury line was constructed. When the Andover and Redbridge Railway opened, (Note: Informally known as the Sprat and Winkle Line.) on 6 March 1865, it became a railway hub. The northern part of the line from Andover joined the Salisbury line at Kimbridge Junction, a short distance north of Romsey. South of Romsey station the A&RR swung away to the south to run direct to Redbridge via Nursling, connecting to Southampton directly. Southampton was a much more important commercial centre than Bishopstoke, and the maritime activity was also key. Although the A&RR gave Romsey a shorter route to Southampton by way of Nursling than the original one via Bishopstoke, the LSWR did not provide a frequent passenger service on the Nursling route for many years, emphasising the Bishopstoke line.

=== The Salisbury and Dorset Junction Railway ===
In 1866 Salisbury gained an additional route, when on 17 December 1866 the Salisbury and Dorset Junction Railway opened. It struck south from Alderbury Junction, about five miles from Salisbury, and ran through Fordingbridge to a junction at West Moors, on the way to Wimborne.

The line never developed as a trunk route as the constructing company had hoped. Some summer-Saturday through trains operated in later years, but the line remained essentially rural.

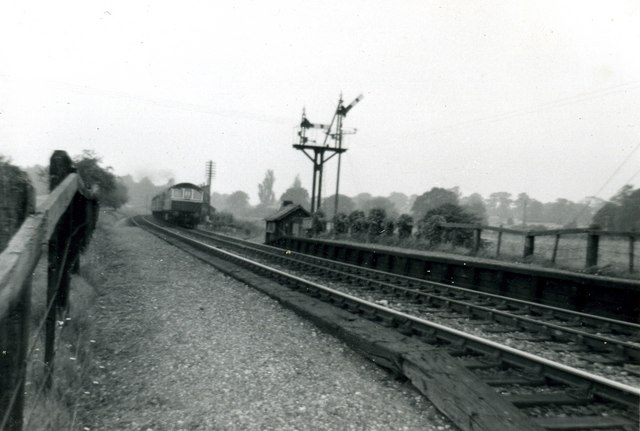
The platforms at Alderbury Halt shortly before closure; the train is approaching from Salisbury and the road is set for Romsey

A basic exchange platform was erected at Alderbury Junction to enable the transfer of passengers off the Fordingbridge line into an early Romsey train; the platform was later used for railway staff and their families. It was in use by February 1872 when the service timetable specified that the 05:40 Dorchester-Salisbury would stop at the "staff platforms" to set down passengers for the Bishopstoke line on notice to the Guard, connecting into the 07:55 from Salisbury, which would be stopped specially by the Alderbury Junction signalman.

=== Collaboration with the GWR at Salisbury ===
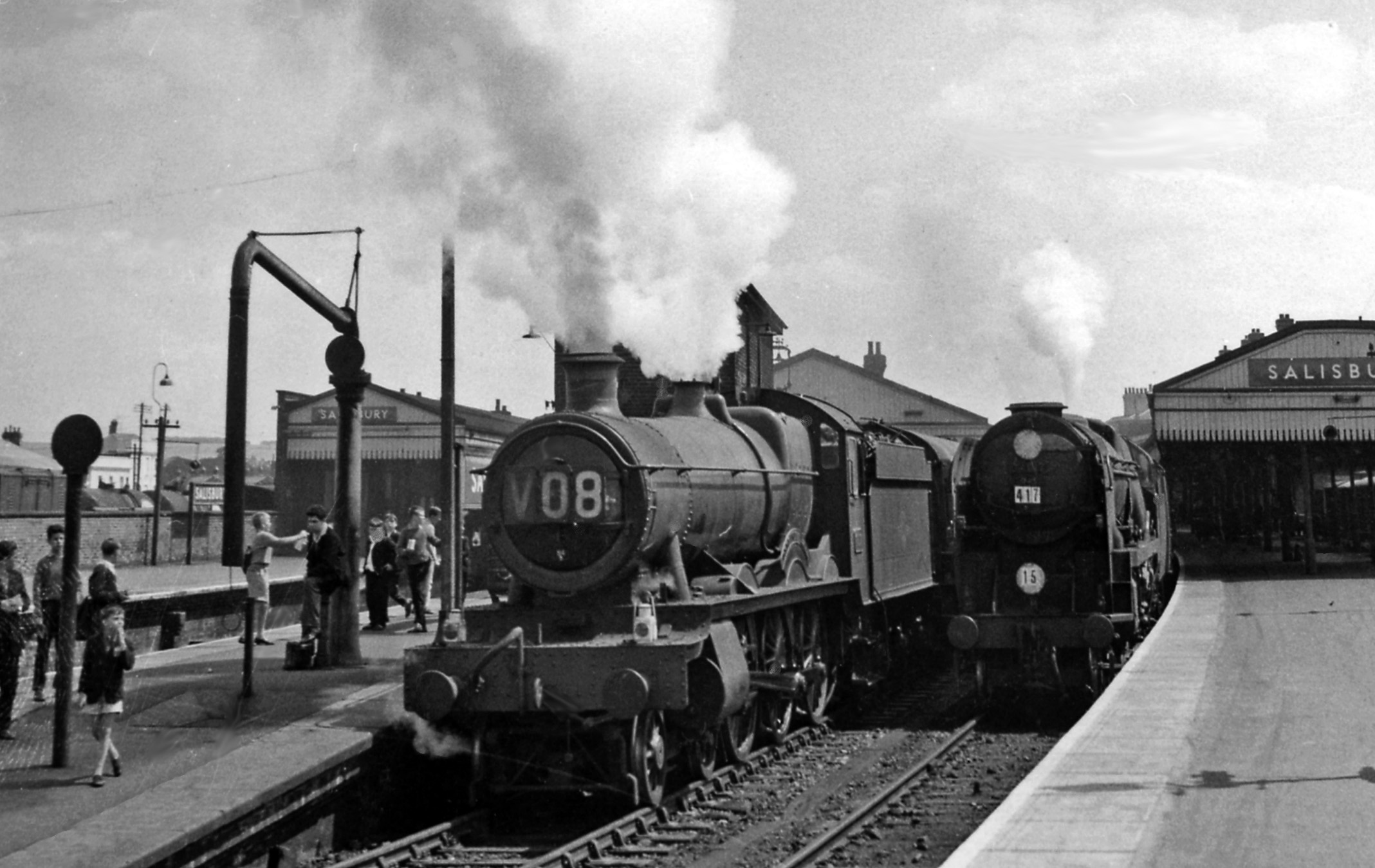
A Western Region train (left) on a Portsmouth to Cardiff train at Salisbury

The Great Western Railway converted its Salisbury branch to standard gauge in 1874, and through running between Bristol and Southampton was possible after a direct connection between the LSWR and GWR lines at Salisbury was opened in 1878. For some years this was referred to as a "direct siding" and used for wagon exchange purposes only. Completion of the Severn Tunnel in 1886 had made direct services from South Wales a realistic aspiration. Construction of the line between Netley and Fareham in 1889, gave Southampton a shorter route to Portsmouth than via Eastleigh. However the route was single track for several years, and its winding course made it slow and limited its capacity. As a result, the Eastleigh route remained dominant until the end of the nineteenth century, with most passenger trains running to Southampton Docks station. (Note: Southampton Docks station was renamed Southampton Town in September 1896.)

Furthermore, as ocean-going sailing ships gave way to coal-powered vessels, there was generated an increasing demand for Welsh coal at Southampton and Portsmouth. A heavy mineral traffic developed on the line.

The first Cardiff-Portsmouth passenger services commenced on 1 July 1896, using the 1878 connection at Salisbury; locomotives were normally changed there. At first there was one train each way, weekdays only, increased to two in the summer by May 1897, when there were trains from Portsmouth Town to Cardiff at 08:15 and 17:00.

== The twentieth century ==
=== Train services ===
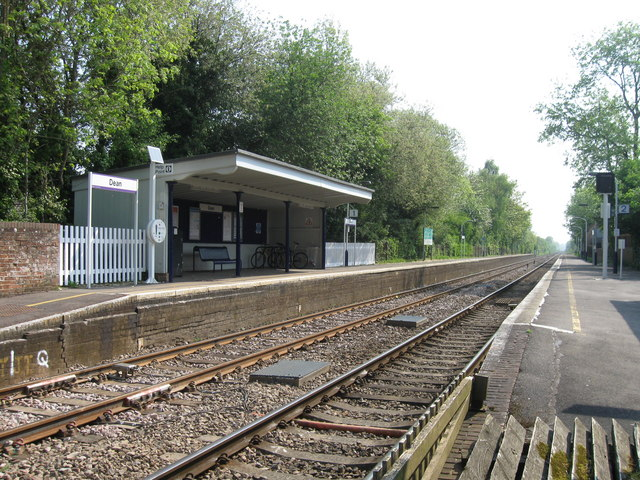
Dean station in modern times

Doubling of the Netley line between St Denys and Fareham was completed by 1911, allowing more trains to run between Cardiff or Bristol and Portsmouth. In the October 1912 timetable there were four through trains in each direction on weekdays, two from Cardiff to Portsmouth Town, and two from Bristol and back. All the up trains ran via Redbridge, but the two trains from Bristol went via Eastleigh.

Diesel-electric multiple units replaced steam trains on the Salisbury to Eastleigh local services in 1957.

=== Chandlers Ford ===
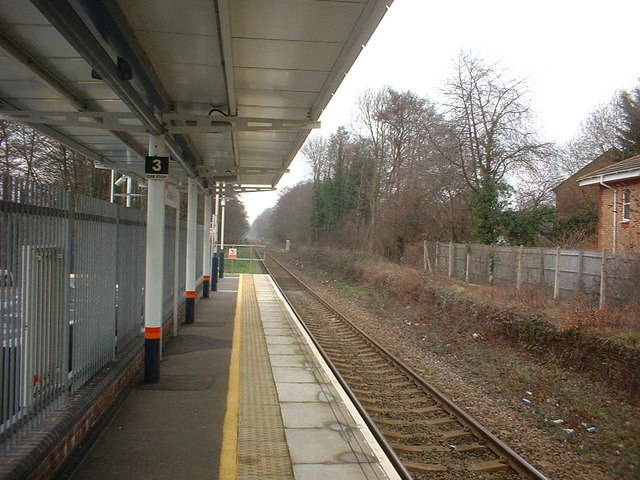
Chandlers Ford Station in modern times

In the 1960s the passenger train service between Eastleigh and Romsey was reduced significantly, and on 5 May 1969 Chandlers Ford station was closed. Reflecting the diminished usage of the Eastleigh – Romsey line, it was reduced to single track on 1 May 1972. With the revival of the attitude of Government to railways, and the increase in housing locally, Chandlers Ford station was reopened on 18 May 2003.

=== Laverstock curve ===
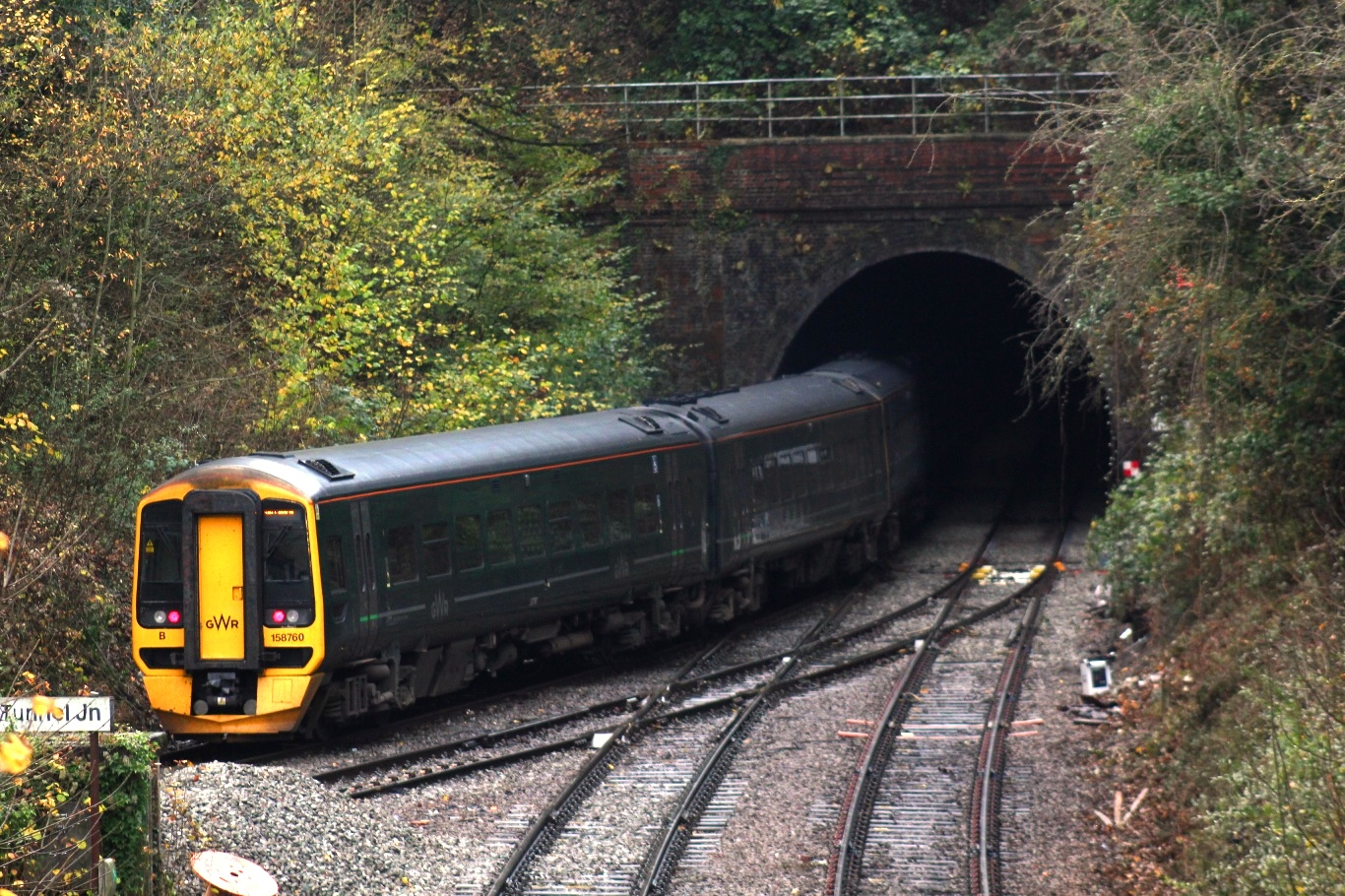
A modern train working from Portsmouth to Cardiff at Salisbury Tunnel Junction

The Laverstock curve was reopened in the autumn of 1981. It had been the main line between Andover and Milford station, Salisbury between 1857 and 1859, but was closed when the through Salisbury station at Fisherton Street was commissioned. A siding remained on the formation for some years, accessible only from the Romsey end. It was known as Drummond's Siding.

When modern signalling was installed in the area, it became feasible to reopen it (Note: In the days of mechanical signalling, a signalbox at each end of the spur would have been needed to operate it, imposing a difficult staff demand.) for diverted services when the direct line between Basingstoke and Eastleigh was blocked for engineering works. This includes container trains from Southampton Freightliner terminal. The route from Basingstoke is not electrified.

== Locations ==
- Bishopstoke; opened 29 November 1841; renamed Eastleigh and Bishopstoke 1889; renamed Eastleigh for Bishopstoke 9 July 1923; renamed Eastleigh 1955; still open;
- Chandlers Ford; opened February 1848; closed 5 May 1969; reopened 18 May 2003; still open;
- Romsey; opened 1 March 1847; still open;
- Kimbridge Junction;
- Dunbridge; opened 1 March 1847; renamed Mottisfont Dunbridge 16 May 1988; renamed Dunbridge 29 May 1994; renamed Mottisfont & Dunbridge 10 December 2006; still open;
- Dean; opened 1 March 1847; still open;
- Alderbury Junction; opened February 1872 as exchange platform; used later by staff families; market; closed 4 May 1964;
- Salisbury (Milford); opened 1 March 1847; closed 2 May 1859.

== Passenger services ==
Passenger services are operated by South Western Railway. Typically there is an hourly service running Romsey – Eastleigh – Southampton – Romsey – Salisbury. This is supplemented by a Great Western Railway service running hourly from Portsmouth to Southampton – Romsey – Salisbury – Cardiff.
