= Goode–Hall House =

Historic house in Alabama, United States

- U.S. National Register of Historic Places
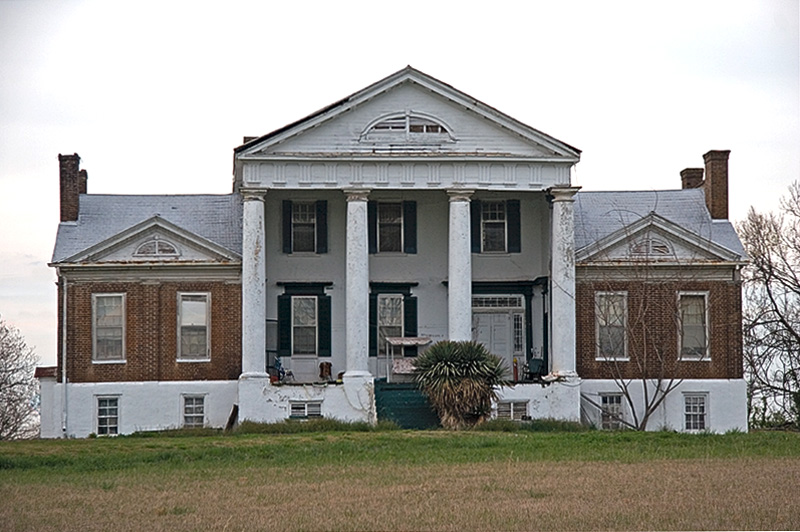
- The house in 2006

- Location within Alabama Location within the United States
- Nearest city: Town Creek, Alabama
- Coordinates: 34°43′31″N 87°23′24″W
- Built: 1824
- Architect: Saunders, Rev. Turner
- Architectural style: Jeffersonian
- NRHP reference No.: 74000418
- Added to NRHP: October 01, 1974

The Goode–Hall House, also commonly known as Saunders Hall, is a historic plantation house in the Tennessee River Valley near Town Creek, Alabama. It was added to the National Register of Historic Places on October 1, 1974, due to its architectural significance.

== History ==
The house was built in 1824 by Turner Saunders, a Methodist minister and planter originally from Brunswick County, Virginia. After living in the house for a little more than a decade, Saunders sold it in 1844 to Freeman Goode. The house was later acquired by the Hall family and then, in the 1940s, it passed into the care of the Leonard Preuit family when they purchased the 1,000-acre (400 ha) farm property that the house sits on. It remains in the family today, although they have never resided there because of its remote nature.

== Architecture ==
The house is built in a provincial interpretation of a Palladian three-part plan, possibly influenced by the Jeffersonian architecture of Saunders' native Virginia. The cramped proximity of the three front triangular pediments betray the vernacular nature of the composition, although the remainder is well-proportioned.

The entire house is constructed in brick above a raised basement. The two-story main block features a Tuscan portico with an arched lunette in the pediment, a common Jeffersonian architectural device. The main block is flanked by one-story wings with front and side gables. Their front pediments also feature lunettes. The wings' front walls feature brick pilasters with simple capitals. The front door is noteworthy in that it features two engaged Tuscan columns supporting a molded cornice.

The Goode–Hall House was not the only large plantation house built in the area by the Saunders family. Turner Saunder's son, James, built a large Italianate house at Rocky Hill Castle.

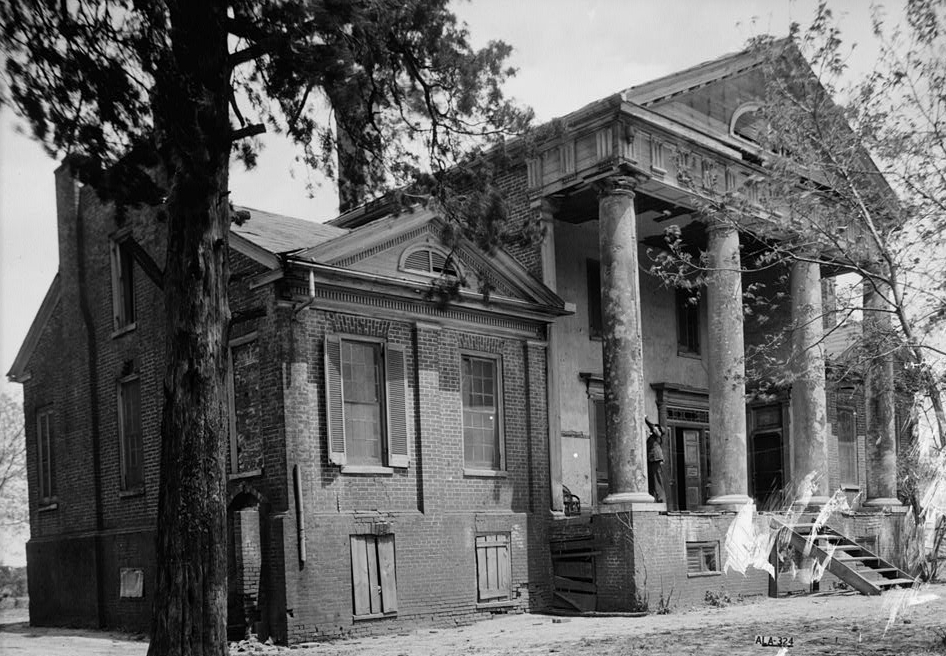
Front (south) and west elevation in 1937.

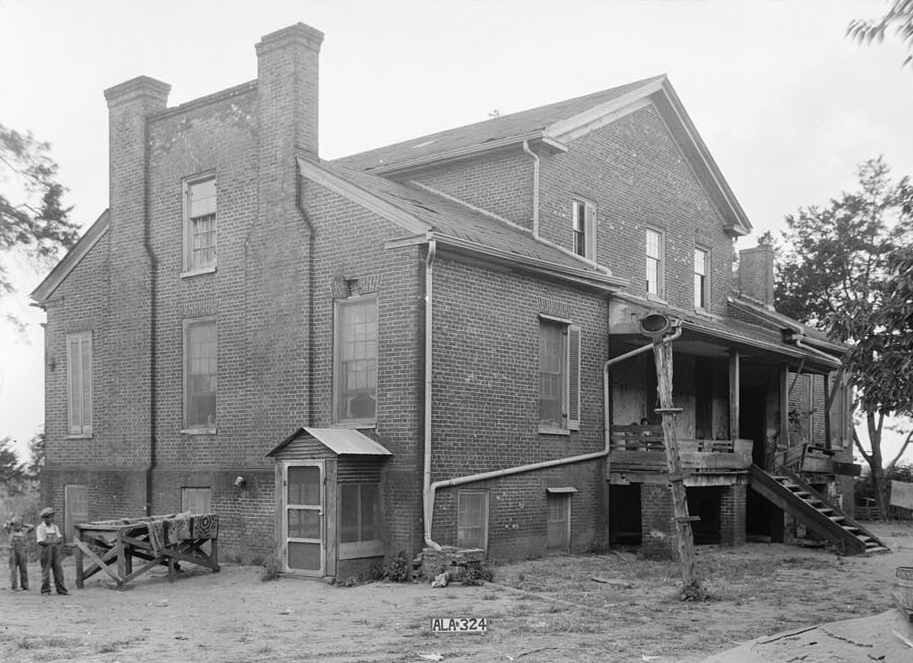
Rear (north) and east elevation in 1935.

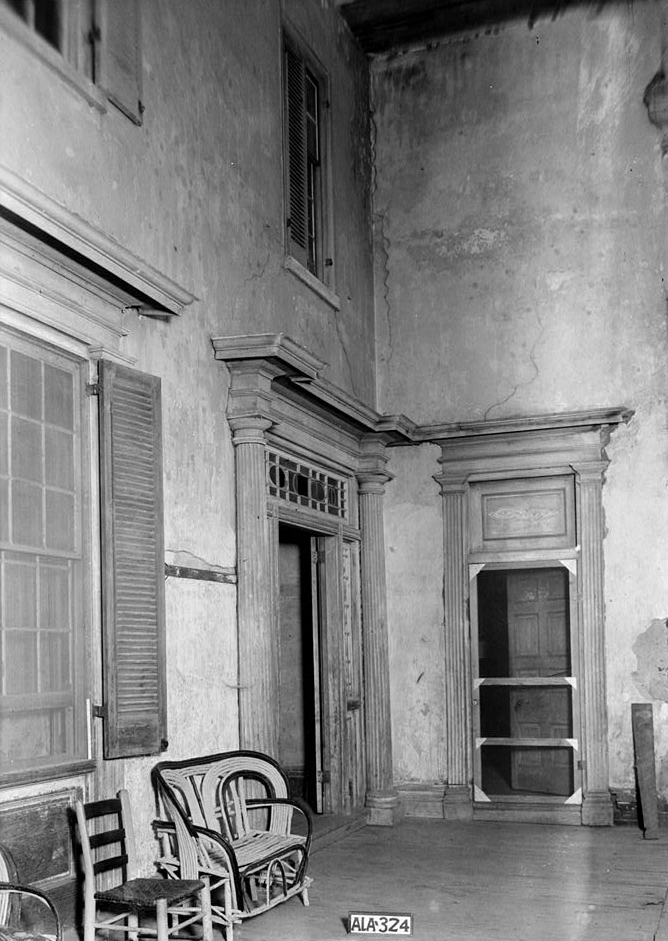
Front porch, detail of front entrance.

== See also ==
- National Register of Historic Places listings in Lawrence County, Alabama
