= Dr. John R. Drish House =

Historic house in Alabama, United States

- Jemison School-Drish House (Dr. John R. Drish House)
- U.S. National Register of Historic Places
- Alabama Register of Landmarks and Heritage
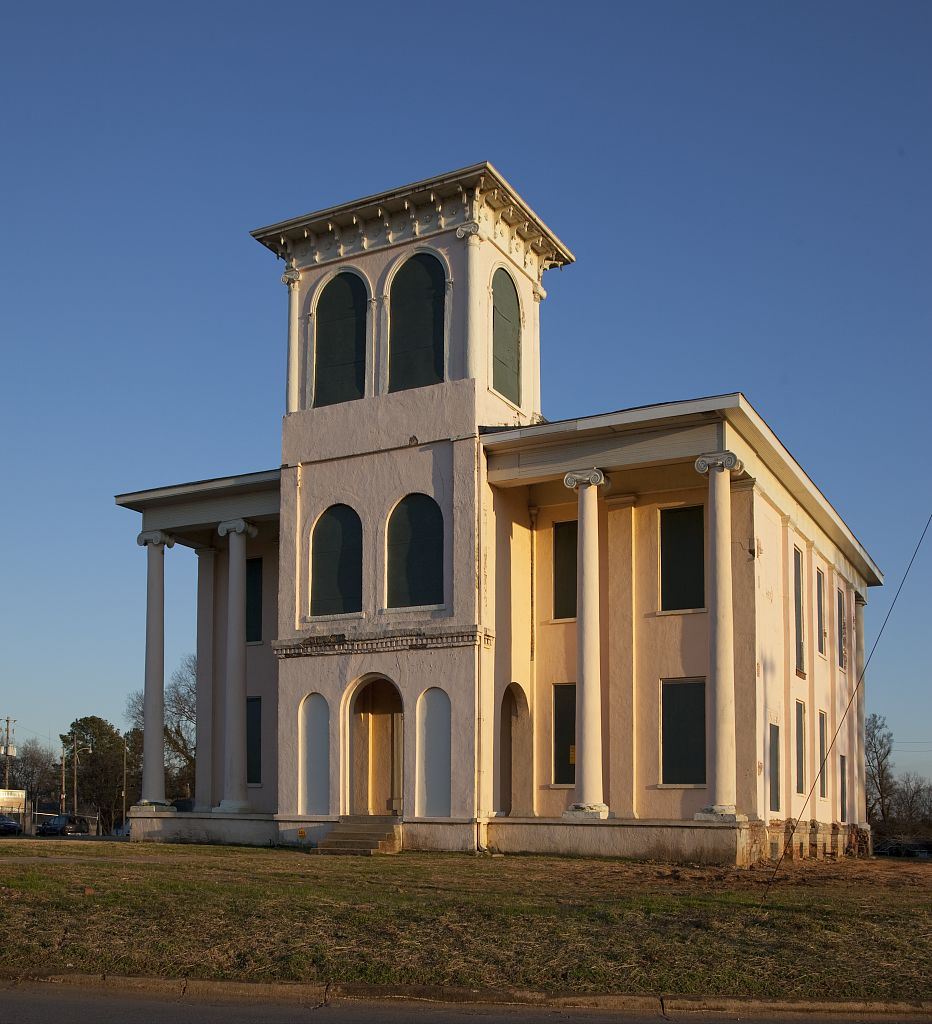
- Drish House in 2010, with stabilization measures underway

- Location within Alabama Location within the United States
- Location: 2300 17th Street, Tuscaloosa, Alabama
- Coordinates: 33.19755°N 87.56185°W
- Built: 1837–1861; 165 years ago
- Architectural style: Greek Revival, Italianate
- NRHP reference No.: 14000357

Significant dates
- Added to NRHP: March 17, 2015
- Designated ARLH: July 31, 1975

The Dr. John R. Drish House, also known simply as the Drish House, is a historic plantation house in Tuscaloosa, Alabama, United States. It is considered by state preservationists to be one of the most distinctive mixes of the Greek Revival and Italianate styles in Alabama. First recorded by the Historic American Buildings Survey in 1934, it was added to the Alabama Register of Landmarks and Heritage on July 31, 1975, and subsequently to the state's "Places in Peril" listing in 2006. It was listed as Jemison School-Drish House on the National Register of Historic Places in 2015.

== Construction ==
The large stuccoed brick mansion was built at the center of a 450-acre (1.8 km^{2}) plantation on the edge of town for Dr. John R. Drish in 1837. Drish, a native of Virginia, was among the earliest settlers of Tuscaloosa, settling there in 1822. A widower himself, he married a wealthy widow, Sarah Owen McKinney, in 1835. By that time he had a successful physician's practice and worked as a building contractor, with many skilled slave artisans. These slaves executed much of the early plasterwork in Tuscaloosa.

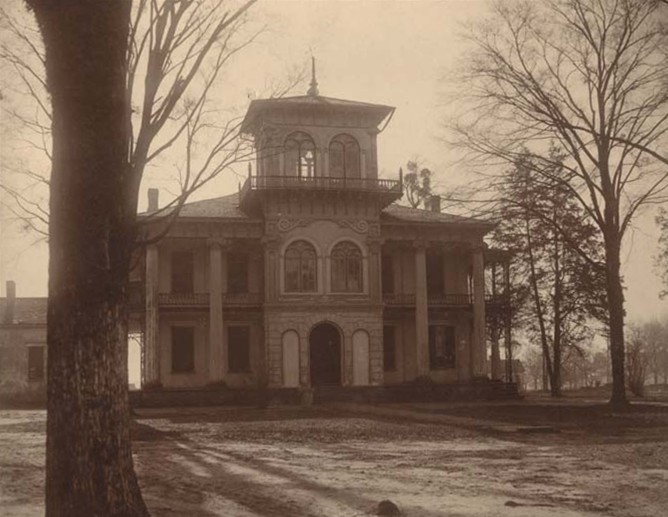
The Drish House in 1911, while still intact.

Built for Drish by his slave artisans, the first early incarnation of the house is usually credited to the influence of state architect William Nichols. The exterior of the house, as completed in 1837, featured full-width, monumental Doric porticoes to the front and rear, with two-story pilasters dividing each bay on all four sides.

The house was extensively remodeled in the Italianate-style before the American Civil War, with a three-story brick tower being added, the front columns changed to the Ionic order, brackets being added to the eaves and overhangs, and two-story cast iron side porches to each side. John Drish died in 1867, reportedly from a fall down a stairway, and Sarah Drish died in 1884.

== Subsequent history ==
The mansion changed hands several times after the death of Sarah Drish; while it was still a residence the surrounding property was sold and subdivided to create Tuscaloosa's first major expansion. The structure eventually came to be owned by the Tuscaloosa Board of Education, who opened the Jemison School in the house in 1906. The house continued to be used as a school until 1925, after which it was purchased for use as a parts warehouse for Charles Turner's Tuscaloosa Wrecking Company. It was during its use as a parts warehouse that Walker Evans took his famous photograph of it in 1935 or 1936, displayed at the Metropolitan Museum of Art.

In 1940, it was purchased by the Southside Baptist Church, which added a sanctuary abutting the house on one side and a detached Sunday school building on the other. The church retained it for the rest of the 20th century. It was eventually threatened by proposed demolition in 1994, but was leased to the Heritage Commission of Tuscaloosa County instead by former church members when the church became defunct in 1995. The house was in a state of disrepair by 2006, when it was added to the "Places in Peril" listing by the Alabama Historical Commission and Alabama Trust For Historic Preservation. It was deeded to the Tuscaloosa County Preservation Society in July 2007, which stabilized the structure. They had the church additions demolished in 2009. In 2012 the Drish House was purchased by Nika McCool of Past Horizons LLC. Renovations continued on the exterior and interior of the house through May 2016, when it opened as an event venue.

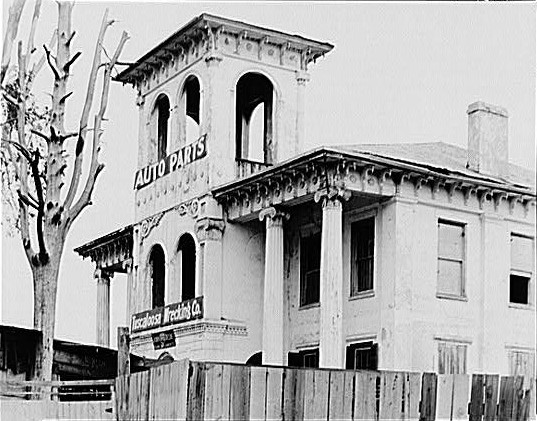
The Drish House in 1936, by Walker Evans.

== Folklore ==
The house has been the site of purported hauntings since the early 20th century. It was featured in Kathryn Tucker Windham and Margaret Gillis Figh's book 13 Alabama Ghosts and Jeffrey, in the short story "Death Lights in the Tower." Alleged supernatural events over the years have included people reportedly seeing the third-story tower on fire, when no fire is present, and ghostly lights coming out of the house.

== See also ==
- Reportedly haunted locations in Alabama
- National Register of Historic Places listings in Tuscaloosa County, Alabama
