= Grove Place =

Building in Nursling, Hampshire, England

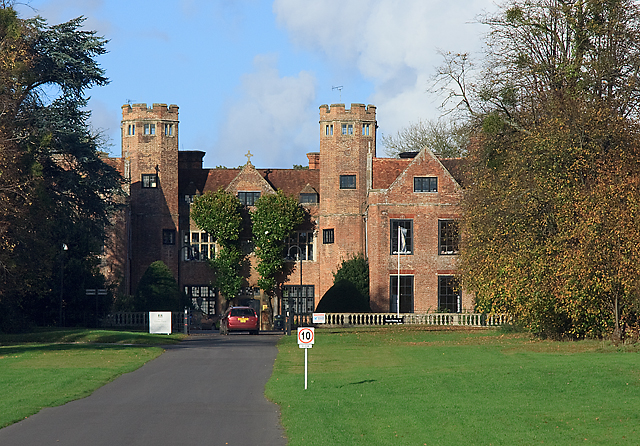

- Location within Hampshire
- 50.9491°N 1.47922°W
- Type: Country house
- Location: Upton Lane, Nursling
- OS grid reference: SU3668516758

History
- Built: Mid 16th century

Site notes
- Area: Hampshire
- Architectural style: Elizabethan
- Owner: LifeCare Residences

Listed Building – Grade I
- Official name: Grove Place House, Northcliffe School
- Designated: 29 May 1957
- Reference no.: 1339157

Grove Place is a Grade I listed building in Nursling, Hampshire. The building was originally a country house and was converted into a lunatic asylum in the 19th century, subsequently used as a farmhouse, and then converted back into a private house before becoming a school in the 1990s, then redeveloped as retirement accommodation in the early 21st century.

== History ==
The current house at Grove Place replaced an older one which was located to the south west of the building that stands today. The older house dated from medieval times.

In the 15th century the manor of Southwells, into which Grove Place was incorporated, came to be possessed by the Dean and Canons of St George's Chapel in Windsor Castle. Several estates in the area were purchased by a merchant from Southampton named John Mill in the 1520s, and his son Thomas leased the house and six acres of garden at Grove Place from Romsey Abbey.

Thomas Mill died in 1560 and the house and garden passed to his son, Richard. John Mill's son-in-law, James Paget, leased Southwells from the Dean and Canons of St George's Chapel in 1561 for 81 years and it was Paget who commissioned the building of the new house at Grove Place, about 100 metres away from the medieval building which continued to be occupied into the next century.

The house, an Elizabethan mansion, was built in the mid to late 16th century, probably between 1565 and 1576, with some alterations and restoration taking place towards the end of the 18th century and again in 1895.

James Paget's son-in-law William Paulet transferred the remainder of the Southwells lease to Richard Mill in 1590. The manor was purchased by King Charles I in 1630 and he granted it to Henry Knollys. The Knollys family dwelt at Grove Place until Robert Knollys died without a male heir in 1751 and ownership reverted to the Mill family, who kept most of the farmland on the estate but leased 88 acres, including the house.

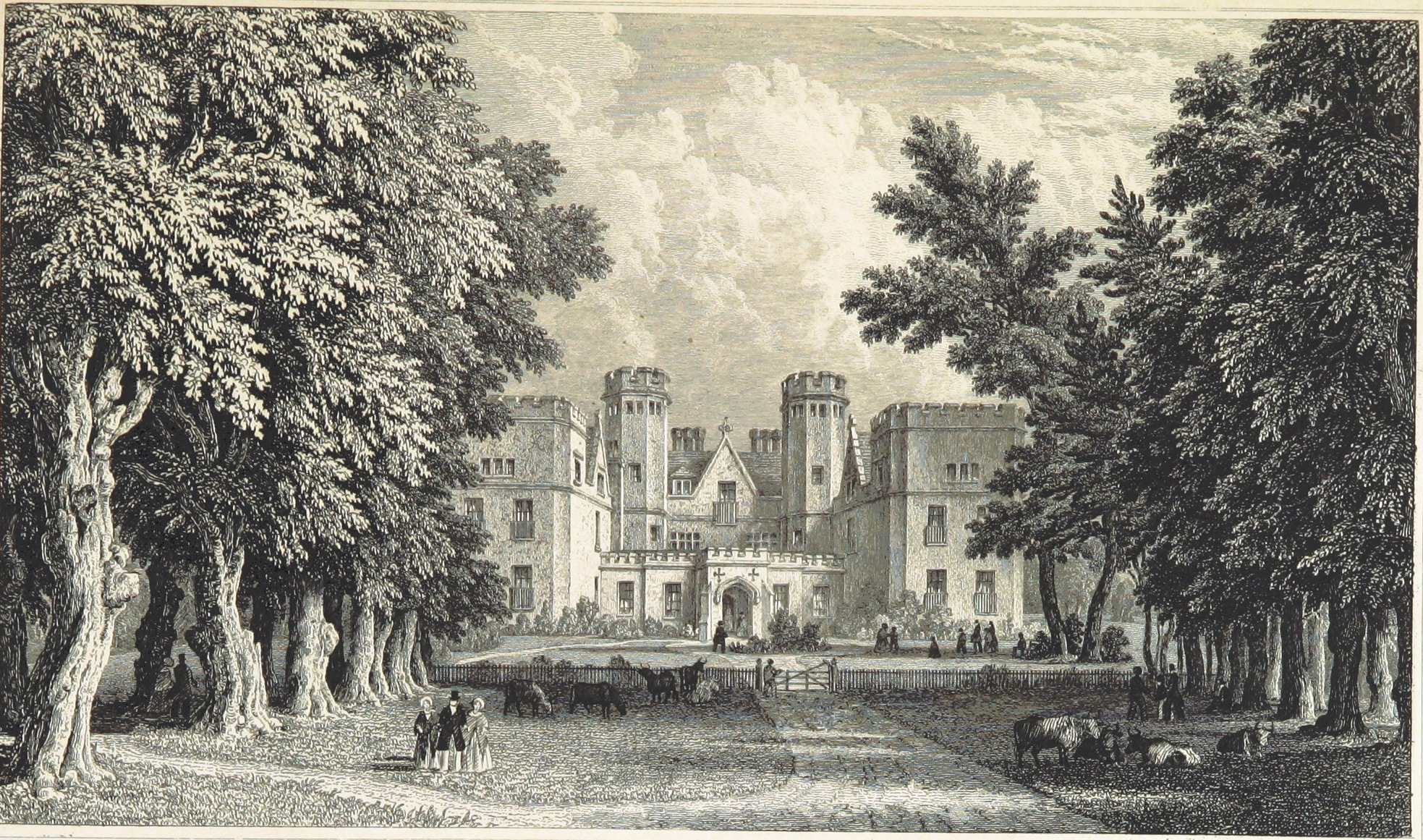
Grove Place as a lunatic asylum in the 19th century

Dr Edward Middleton purchased the property in 1831 and converted it into a private lunatic asylum. By 1844 the asylum was owned and run by Mrs Harriette Middleton and her family. Following her death, her son Henry was given the opportunity to buy the property but he declined, with the building being sold to Isaac Pothecary and William Symes of Bishop's Waltham for £5,000, with a mortgage from Harriette Middleton's friends Thomas Burdon of London and Alexander Frederick Patterson of Southampton.

The first patients to be admitted to the Hampshire County Lunatic Asylum were twelve patients selected from Grove Place by two justices of the peace; the first six were transferred on 13 December 1852.

As well as private patients, the asylum at Grove Park accepted paupers from poor law unions in the area, but the two groups were treated very differently. In 1844 the 19 private patients were housed in the main house but the 53 resident paupers were located in outbuildings. They were separated into "clean" and "dirty" patients but otherwise little attention was paid to their comfort or rehabilitation.

Magistrates visited Grove Place in 1853 and, finding evidence that a patient there had been treated cruelly and severely, they recommended that the owner's licence to run the asylum be discontinued. The following year the asylum was sold to Dr James Baillie. Baillie paid a considerable sum to take over the asylum and the Lunacy Commissioners reported in 1854 that they were concerned he would attempt to seek a return on his investment by cutting back further on the quality of the patients' accommodation. Subsequently, the asylum's licence was not renewed.

The house remained empty from 1855 to 1861 when it was purchased by Viscount Palmerston who leased it as a farmhouse but it was purchased by Colonel de Sales la Terriere in 1895, who restored the interior of the house and extended the gardens. The colonel sold the estate in 1906 and by 1908 it was owned by Mr. Clarence Wilson. Soon after, it was sold at auction to an unknown buyer who sold it to Lord Henry Grosvenor, who died in 1914. The estate was then bought by Major Oswald Magniac who lived there until his death in 1939. His widow, Florence, continued to live there with her daughter Joan.

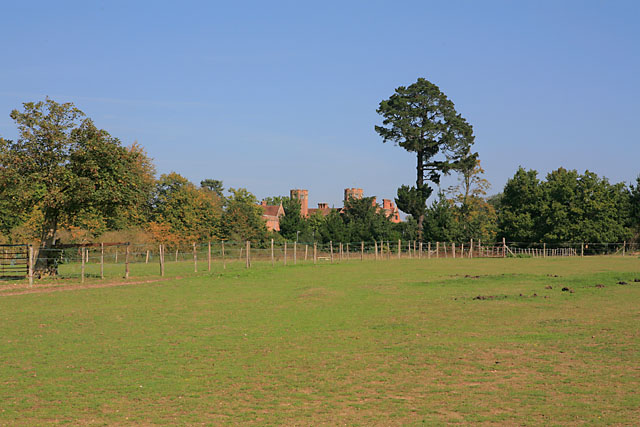
Grove Place from nearby fields in 2006

The estate was divided into lots in 1949 and they were all sold, and the house was given its Grade I designation on 29 May 1957. The house and gardens were sold to Northcliffe School in 1961, and the school demolished parts of the gardens to make way for several new buildings. The remains of the gardens were not well cultivated during the school's tenure. The Atherley School took over Northcliffe School in 1995 and built further buildings on top of the gardens. The school closed in 2006.

The estate is now owned by LifeCare Residences Ltd, who have converted the house into retirement flats and built several modern buildings in the grounds, including a two-storey, 54-bedroom care home and associated car park; a workshop complex with garage, mess and mobile home park; an extension to the school building and several bungalows; and a gymnasium and swimming pool complex.

== In literature ==
Grove Place and the nearby New Forest are the setting of Hide and Seek, the debut novel of E. E. Cowper (credited as "Mrs Frank Cooper"). The novel is set in 1647, during the English Civil War, and was published by SPCK in 1881.
