= Red Lady of Huntingdon College =

American ghost

Coordinates: 32.350°N 86.285°W

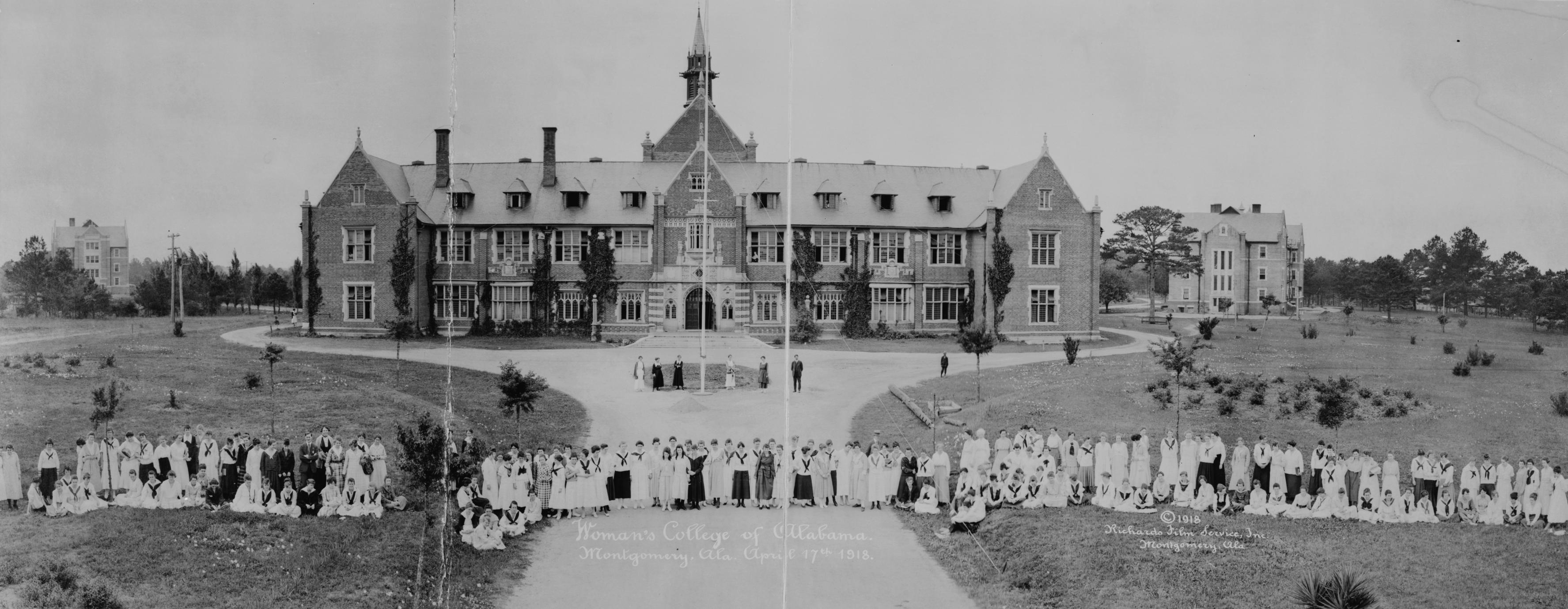
Alabama Women's College in 1918, which would later become Huntingdon College

The Red Lady of Huntingdon College is a ghost said to haunt the former Pratt Hall dormitory at Huntingdon College in Montgomery, Alabama. Her story is told in Huntingdon alumnus Kathryn Tucker Windham's book 13 Alabama Ghosts and Jeffrey.

== The first "Red Lady" ==
According to Windham and historian Daniel Barefoot, there have actually been two ghosts alleged to have haunted Huntingdon College. They first appeared in the late nineteenth century, while the college was still located in the town of Tuskegee, Alabama. She was described as a young woman wearing a scarlet dress and carrying a scarlet parasol who walked wordlessly up and down the halls of a women's dormitory late one night, bathed in a red glow. This apparition, according to Windham, ultimately left the residence hall and disappeared from view as she passed through a gateway outside. The alleged identity or origin of this wraith has never been determined, and she was apparently never seen again.

== The second "Red Lady" ==
=== Martha arrives at Huntingdon ===
The second Red Lady, according to Windham, was a former student named Martha (according to Windham) or Margaret (according to another source; no last name for this alleged person has ever been offered) who had reluctantly come to Huntingdon from New York, because her father's mother had attended Huntingdon when it was in Tuskegee, and his will specified that she must attend his mother's alma mater. Martha did not especially want to come to Alabama, but her father's fortune was large and she knew his deep love for his home state. Martha, according to the legend, was dressed in red when she arrived, and she brought with her red draperies for her windows and a red spread for her bed together with other accessories of the same color. Although many of her fellow students asked her to explain her apparent obsession with the color red, Martha always demurred.

=== Coping problems ===
Being a stranger and shy, as well as unhappy in her unfamiliar surroundings, Martha could not make friends among the students. They sensed that she was different from them, and having heard she was wealthy, they mistook her shyness for disdain. Martha sat alone and apart from them in the dining hall, and seldom spoke to her roommate. When other girls (Huntingdon was an all-female institution at this time) dropped in to visit, she seemed so cold and unfriendly that they eventually stopped coming. Truthfully, many of them had only come out of curiosity to see the red prayer rug Martha had bought in Turkey and the odd little red figurines on her bookshelves.

Martha's roommate, according to Windham's story, ultimately found the situation unbearable and asked the housemother if she could move out. The housemother granted this request and put someone else in the room with Martha, who became increasingly aloof and irritable. This second girl also left her after only a week. This procedure happened again and again as one roommate after another found it impossible to live with the surly girl. At last the president of the dormitory, who was known for her ability to get along with everybody, moved in with Martha and did everything she could to make friends with her, but all efforts were futile. Martha had become embittered as well as withdrawn, and she seemed to resent the presence of this kindhearted girl.

After all her efforts at friendship had failed and after she found herself growing depressed and despondent, the dormitory president packed her belongings and prepared to leave. Just as she was about to go, Martha, who had not known of her imminent departure, returned to the room. With a look of defiance she said (according to Windham's story), "So you couldn't stand me either - like all the rest of your stuck up friends. I was beginning to think you really wanted me to be your friend but you hate me just like the rest. Well, I'm glad to be rid of you! Take your things and go! But I'll tell you one thing, my dear: for the rest of your life you'll regret leaving this room." The house president was disturbed by this bitter outburst but in the midst of her many activities she soon forgot about Martha's prophetic words.

=== Odd behavior ===
The sad girl, abandoned by the one person she had believed to be her only friend, allegedly formed the habit of wandering into rooms where the other girls were congregating, but her presence cast a chill upon the groups and they would soon find flimsy excuses for leaving her alone. Then, with a feeling of alienation from all humankind, she would return to her solitary sleeping quarters, where she would wrap herself in her red bedspread and retreat from the whole world.

Later, Martha's behavior allegedly became even more strange: She would wait until the lights were out, and then she would visit one dormitory after another, never saying a word but staring into space as if she were in a trance. As time passed, she took to walking up and down the halls during the darkest hours of the night. Often she would alarm the girls by opening and closing their doors, then hurrying away to resume her pitiful promenade.

=== Suicide and alleged ghostly activities ===
One evening after Martha had not appeared for classes or meals all day, her former roommate, the dormitory president, had a guilty feeling and decided to go see her, thinking that this time she might be able to help Martha in some way. As she neared Martha's room at an isolated corridor at the top floor of the building, she is said to have noticed flashes of red shooting out into the corridor from the room's transom. Opening the door, she screamed and fainted. Girls from all over the fourth floor of Pratt rushed from their rooms to see what was wrong. Martha, or so the story goes, was found on the floor of her room, dressed in her red robe and draped in her red bedspread, having committed suicide by slashing her wrists.

This happened "a long time ago", according to Windham, but students at Huntingdon have alleged that on the date of Martha's suicide each year rays of crimson light flash down from the transom of her room, and the Red Lady returns to haunt the corridors of Pratt Hall. Students have allegedly reported seeing Martha's ghost on Pratt Hall's fourth floor, claiming to have seen it pass through walls or closed doors.

=== Commemoration ===
Today, Pratt Hall has been converted from a dormitory to the college's Department of Education and Psychology.

In October every year, the Chi Omega, Phi Mu, and Alpha Omicron Pi sororities at Huntingdon take part in "The Red Lady Run," painting their faces, wearing all black, and running around the campus.

== Other alleged ghosts ==
In addition to the Red Lady, Huntingdon College is allegedly haunted by the restless spirit of a young male student who supposedly shot himself on the college green sometime during the 1970s after being jilted by a former girlfriend. Students have allegedly reported feeling unseen forces tugging on their clothes as they walk across the green at night, or mussing their hair, or blowing in their ears. Other spirits alleged to haunt portions of the Huntingdon campus include those of a murdered co-ed, a young boy who allegedly drowned in the college pond, a female student clad only in a towel, and a poltergeist known as "Frank the Library Ghost".

== See also ==
- Reportedly haunted locations in Alabama
- Miss Koi Koi
- List of ghosts
