= Milford railway station (Wiltshire) =

Closed railway station in Wiltshire, England

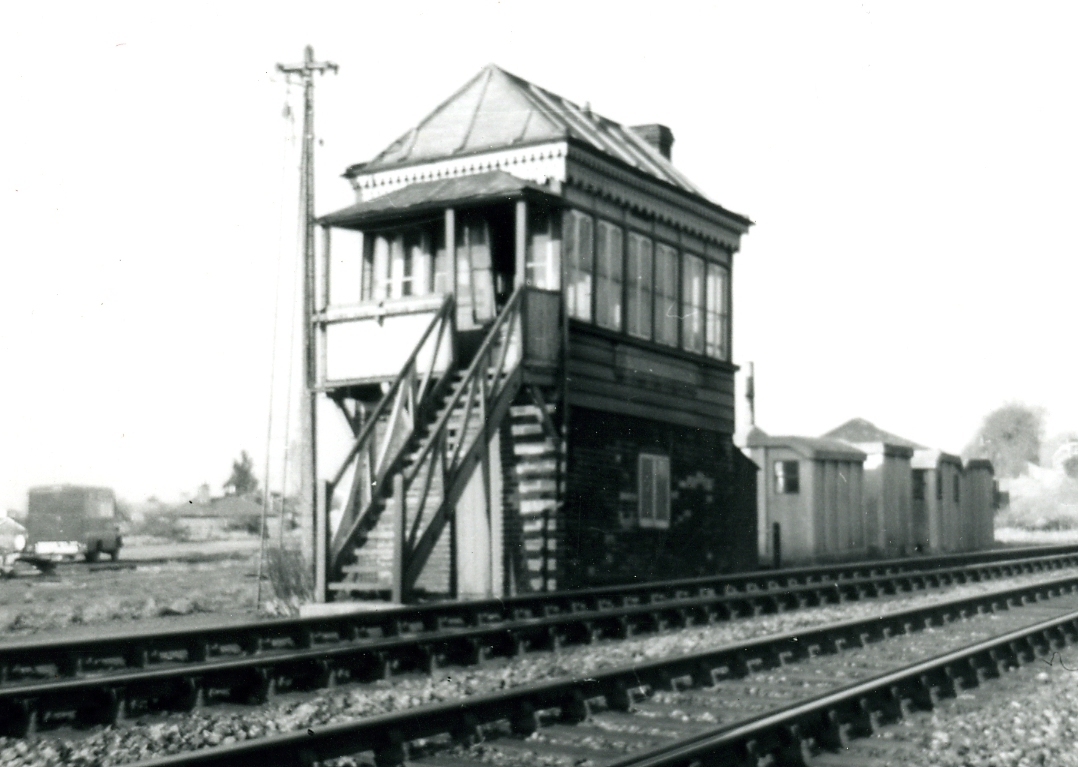
- Salisbury Milford signal box. The old station throat was where the van is in the background

General information
- Location: Salisbury, Wiltshire; England
- Coordinates: 51.066°N 1.784°W
- Grid reference: SU151296
- Operator: LSWR
- Platforms: 1

Other information
- Status: Closed (demolished)

History
- Original company: LSWR
- Post-grouping: Southern Railway

Key dates
- 27 January 1847: Opened to goods
- 1 March 1847: Opened to passengers
- 2 May 1859: Closed to passengers
- 21 August 1967: Closed completely
Location

Milford railway station was the first railway station to be built in the city of Salisbury, Wiltshire, England, in 1847. The Bishopstoke to Salisbury line approached from the south-east, and terminated in the Milford area of the city by the Church of St Martin. In 1859, passenger services were transferred away to the newer station located at Fisherton (now the main station in Salisbury), with Milford retained as a goods depot until the 1960s.

== History ==
The station opened to traffic in 1847, when the London and South Western Railway's branch from Southampton and Bishopstoke was built into the east side of Salisbury. Goods traffic started between Bishopstoke (Eastleigh) and Salisbury in January 1847, with passenger trains starting in March of the same year. The railway's arrival resulted in terraced housing being built in the area around St Martin's Church for the railway workers.

A journey to London took at least four hours with a change at Bishopstoke, until the direct line to London was opened through Andover and Basingstoke in May 1857. This, too, terminated at the Milford station site, which had only one platform. The site at Milford was at the foot of a 1-in-150 gradient, which proved reasonably easy for shunting purposes, but expansion westwards to meet up with other projected railways in the city was complicated as the line would need to cross water meadows near the cathedral. Similarly, the eastwards expansion of the railway across the city from the intended other railways approaching Salisbury from the west or north also proved difficult to achieve. Many who lived in Salisbury thought the newer station was in a less convenient position than Milford station, and that the downhill approach to the Milford terminus offered the best view of the cathedral and the city. Additionally, direct traffic from London via Andover had to draw past Milford Junction facing towards Bishopstoke (Eastleigh), and reverse into the station.

The buildings and wooden platform at Milford station were destroyed by fire on 27 March 1858. The combined length of the passenger shed, the bookstalls and refreshment rooms (350 feet (110 m)) were burnt out within one hour. As the building of the new station had already started, the LSWR threw up a temporary station for the few months that Milford would continue in use as a passenger station.

Upon the opening of Salisbury Tunnel, all passenger traffic was diverted to the newer station in the Fisherton area of the city from 2 May 1859, with the Milford site being retained as a goods depot. The length of the line from Milford Junction was 25 chains (1,600 ft; 500 m) and the diversion northwards and westwards towards the new station was 2 miles 12 chains (3.5 km).

Platform extensions and other buildings being sited at the Salisbury Fisherton station meant that the LSWR concentrated all its goods traffic at Milford. The Railway Clearing House handbook of stations from 1904 states that the station could accept goods, livestock, furniture vans and horse boxes, and was equipped with a 10-tonne (11-ton) crane. By the 1940s, the goods station at Milford was still busy with livestock traffic, especially on Tuesdays, the market day. It had sixteen sidings, a headshunt parallel to Milford Junction, a weighbridge and a goods shed. The longest siding (known as "Cross on the Straight"), was 1,100 feet (340 m) long.

After nationalization, the site was allocated to the Western Region, but the boundaries were re-drawn in 1950, and the Salisbury area including Milford goods was transferred to the Southern Region of British Railways. The site was used until August 1967, then was demolished and cleared in 1968.
