= Turner Saunders =

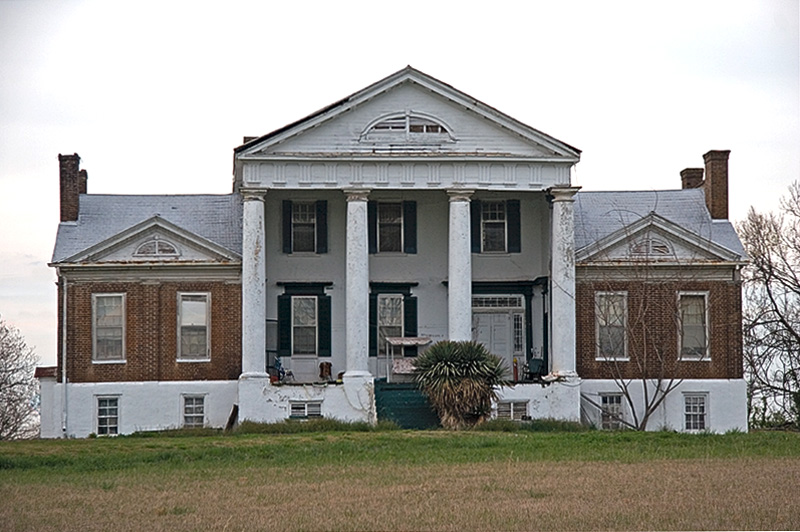
The Saunders Mansion, Town Creek, Alabama, built 1830-35

The Rev. Turner Saunders (January 3, 1782 – March 9, 1854), a noted Methodist preacher, was born in Brunswick County, Virginia.

In 1830 he was elected President of the Board of Trustees of LaGrange College, near Leighton, Alabama, which was burned during the Civil War. He served in that position until moving to Aberdeen, Mississippi, in 1844. Saunders lived in the mansion currently known as the Goode-Hall House, also known as Saunders' Hall, in Lawrence County, Alabama. It is an example of the kind of vernacular classicism that a talented amateur with access to some architectural books could produce for a local builder to follow. The house was sold to Freeman Goode on February 12, 1844.

== Family ==
Turner Saunders was the son of Revolutionary War veteran Thomas Saunders. His mother was Ann Turner. Turner married Frances Dunn and moved to Franklin, Tennessee in 1808; then in 1822 he and his wife moved to Courtland, Alabama. His wife died in 1824 and he married widow Henrietta Millwater on July 1, 1826. She had two young daughters when she married Saunders. Saunders and his wife moved to Aberdeen, Mississippi, where he died on March 9, 1854. Ten children survived him.

One of Turner's sons, James E. Saunders wrote the first major history of Lawrence County, Alabama. The book is titled Early Settlers of Alabama. According to the book his children from his first wife Frances Dunn were Thomas Saunders, Franklin Saunders, Sophie Dunn Saunders, Louisa Turner Saunders, Narcissa Hubbard Saunders, Frances Anne Saunders, Eliza Jane Saunders, Martha Maria Saunders and William H. Saunders. His children from his second wife were Turner Saunders, Franklin Saunders, Thomas Saunders and Hubbard Saunders. The first Thomas and Franklin died around the same time as their mother in Courtland. His daughter Martha Maria Saunders married Benjamin McFarland Bradford who, according to the book, was the Register of Land office at Courtland, Alabama. They had a large family.

In the book, a clip of Turner Saunder's obituary is shared (page 327). It was written by a Bishop Paine. Part of it reads, "Reverend Turner Saunders, or deceased friend was in the proper sense of the word, a gentleman-a Christian gentleman. Without claiming for him remarkably brilliant intellectual parts, he certainly possessed, in a rare degree clear, sound, and well balanced intellect, a judgement singularly correct, a mind so practical and logical as to seldom be misled by speculations, or puzzled by sophisms, and what is of still higher moment, he had a heart alive to all the interests of humanity. Few men were more extensively or favorably known in our community. His capabilities and business habits were a guarantee of success. Industry, method, neatness but the great aim of his life was higher and nobler than the acquisition of wealth and his consistent and pious life is the richest legacy he has left behind him. For about 40 years he was a local preacher and was devoted to the doctrines, institutions and usages of the church."
