= Kalvin Pearson =

American football player (born 1978)

Lane Dragons
- Title: Special teams coordinator & defensive backs coach

Personal information
- Born: October 22, 1978 (age 48); Town Creek, Alabama, U.S.
- Listed height: 5 ft 10 in (1.78 m)
- Listed weight: 200 lb (91 kg)

Career information
- High school: Hazlewood (Town Creek, Alabama)
- College: Morehouse; Grambling
- NFL draft: 2002: undrafted

Career history

Playing
- Cleveland Browns (2002); New York Giants (2003)*; Tampa Bay Buccaneers (2004–2007); Detroit Lions (2008–2009)
- * Offseason or practice squad member only

Coaching
- Grambling State (2011–2013) Assistant coach; Dallas Cowboys (2014) Assistant special teams coordinator; A. H. Parker HS (AL) (2015) Secondary coach & special teams coordinator; A. H. Parker HS (AL) (2017–2022) Cornerbacks coach; Lane (2023–present) Special teams coordinator & defensive backs coach

Career NFL statistics
- Total tackles: 199
- Sacks: 1
- Forced fumbles: 5
- Fumble recoveries: 3
- Pass deflections: 7
- Stats at Pro Football Reference

Kalvin Pearson (born October 22, 1978) is an American football coach and former safety. He is the special teams coordinator and defensive backs coach for Lane College in Jackson, Tennessee, a position he has held since 2023. He was signed by the Cleveland Browns as an undrafted free agent in 2002. He played college football at Grambling.

== Early life ==
Pearson attended Hazlewood High School in Town Creek, Alabama and was a letterman in football.

== College career ==
Pearson attended Grambling State University after transferring from Morehouse College, lettering in football at Grambling.

== Professional career ==
Pearson has also played for the Tampa Bay Buccaneers and Detroit Lions.
