= Rilous Carter =

- Occupations: Vice President, Epcot

Rilous Carter is the Vice President of Disney's Epcot. He had been the VP of Disney's Hollywood Studios before switching positions with Dan Cockerell.

== Early life ==
Carter was born in Town Creek, Alabama where he was also raised.

== Education ==
Carter had an athletic scholarship and worked his way into academic scholarships to go to any college he wanted to go to in the US. He ended up going to the University of Alabama.

== Career ==
Carter is the first African American to hold this position. In 2008, he was appointed as the Vice President of Disney's Hollywood Studios. Carter's non-traditional style of leading has separated himself from the rest. In his position as vice president of Disney's Epcot, he led the teams responsible for driving catering sales, services and banquet operations, and for theme park event operations at the 40-square-mile park and resort.
