= William Harrison (cricketer, born 1875) =

English cricketer

Personal information
- Full name: William Edward Harrison
- Born: 14 August 1875; Warwick, Warwickshire, England
- Died: 23 March 1937 (aged 61); Ruthin Castle, Denbighshire, Wales
- Relatives: William Harrison, Sr. (father); Charles Andreae (son-in-law)

Domestic team information
- Years: Team
- 1895–1900: Staffordshire

Career statistics
Competition	First-class
Matches	2
Runs scored	37
Batting average	9.25
100s/50s	0/0
Top score	15
Catches/stumpings	1/–
- Source: Cricinfo, 18 March 2015

Lt Col William Edward Harrison OBE (14 August 1875 – 23 March 1937) was an English cricketer active from the mid-1890s to the early–1900s. Born at Warwick, Warwickshire, he made two appearances in first-class cricket, but was mostly associated with minor counties cricket.

The son of William Harrison (who also played first-class cricket), Harrison made his debut in minor counties cricket for Staffordshire against Worcestershire in the 1895 Minor Counties Championship at Stoke-on-Trent. He made eight further minor counties appearances for Staffordshire, the last coming in 1900 against Northamptonshire. He made his two appearances in first-class cricket in 1901 for BJT Bosanquet's XI during their tour to North America, playing both matches against the Gentlemen of Philadelphia at Merion and Germantown. He scored a total of 37 runs in his two matches, with a high score of 15.

He was elected to Staffordshire County Council in 1913, made a County Alderman in 1924, and served as the chairman of the county council from 1927–1937.

Harrison was appointed an Officer of the Order of the British Empire (OBE) in the 1918 Birthday Honours, and appointed High Sheriff of Staffordshire in 1927. He died at Ruthin Castle in Wales on 23 March 1937. His son-in-law Charles Andreae also played first-class cricket.
