= Charles Andreae =

English cricketer

Personal information
- Full name: Charles Andreae
- Born: 16 December 1906; Marylebone, London
- Died: 22 June 1970 (aged 63); Broomhall, Sunningdale, Berkshire
- Batting: Right-handed
- Bowling: Right-arm slow

Domestic team information
- Years: Team
- 1929: Cambridge University

Career statistics
Competition	First-class
Matches	2
Runs scored	44
Batting average	14.66
100s/50s	0/0
Top score	18
Balls bowled	216
Wickets	2
Bowling average	59
5 wickets in innings	0
10 wickets in match	0
Best bowling	2/60
Catches/stumpings	1/-
- Source: CricketArchive, 12 August 2008

Charles Andreae (16 December 1906 – 22 June 1970) was an English first-class cricketer who played all his games for Cambridge University Cricket Club. His highest score of 18 came when playing for Cambridge University in the match against Glamorgan County Cricket Club. His best bowling of 2/60 came in the same match.

He also played in a match for the Public Schools against the Australians in a pre season tour of England by Australia.
