= Grancer Harrison =

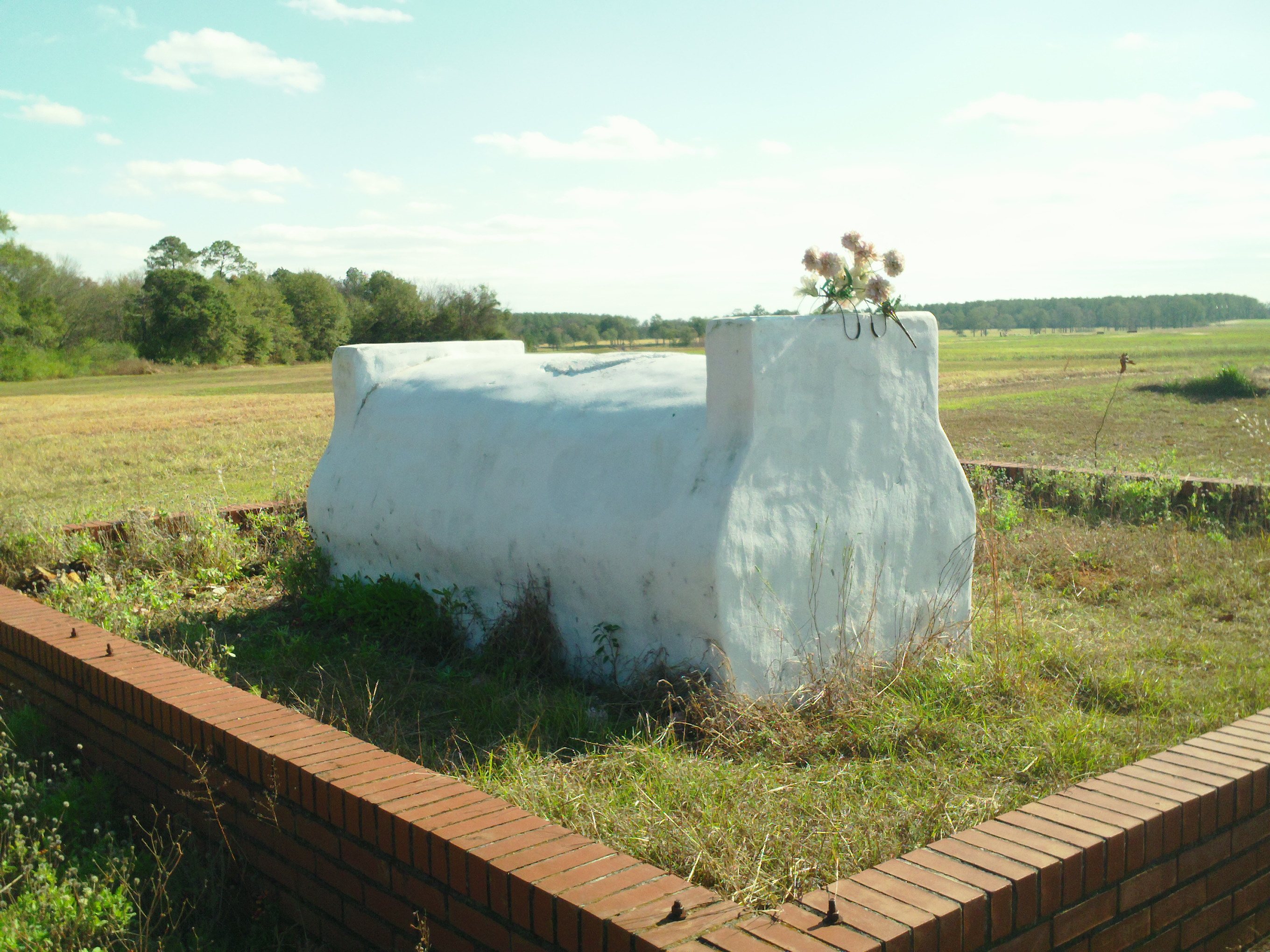
The Grave of Grancer Harrison; November 2011.

William "Grancer" Harrison (circa 1789–1860), or The Dancing Ghost of Grancer Harrison, is the subject of several ghost stories about his alleged spirit seen dancing at his gravesite near Kinston, Alabama. The story was featured in the book 13 Alabama Ghosts and Jeffrey and is the subject of a song by country band Granville Automatic. Originally covered by a large wood-frame grave shelter, the tomb has been vandalized and rebuilt several times in the last 50 years, with the most recent vandalism at the cemetery in 2010. The tomb itself was last reconstructed in 2005.

== Background ==
Harrison was born in the old Ninety-Six District, Edgefield County, South Carolina, around 1789. He came to Coffee County, Alabama, sometime in the 1830s, and established a large plantation near the junction of Cripple Creek and Pea River in an area just out outside of what is now Kinston, Alabama. The Harrisons' plantation was built on a high bank overlooking Pea River. Grancer and wife Nancy had several children. They included Elizabeth, Mary, Charlotte, James M., Frances, Sarah, John A., William A., Moses M., and Martha Jane.

== The Ghost Story ==
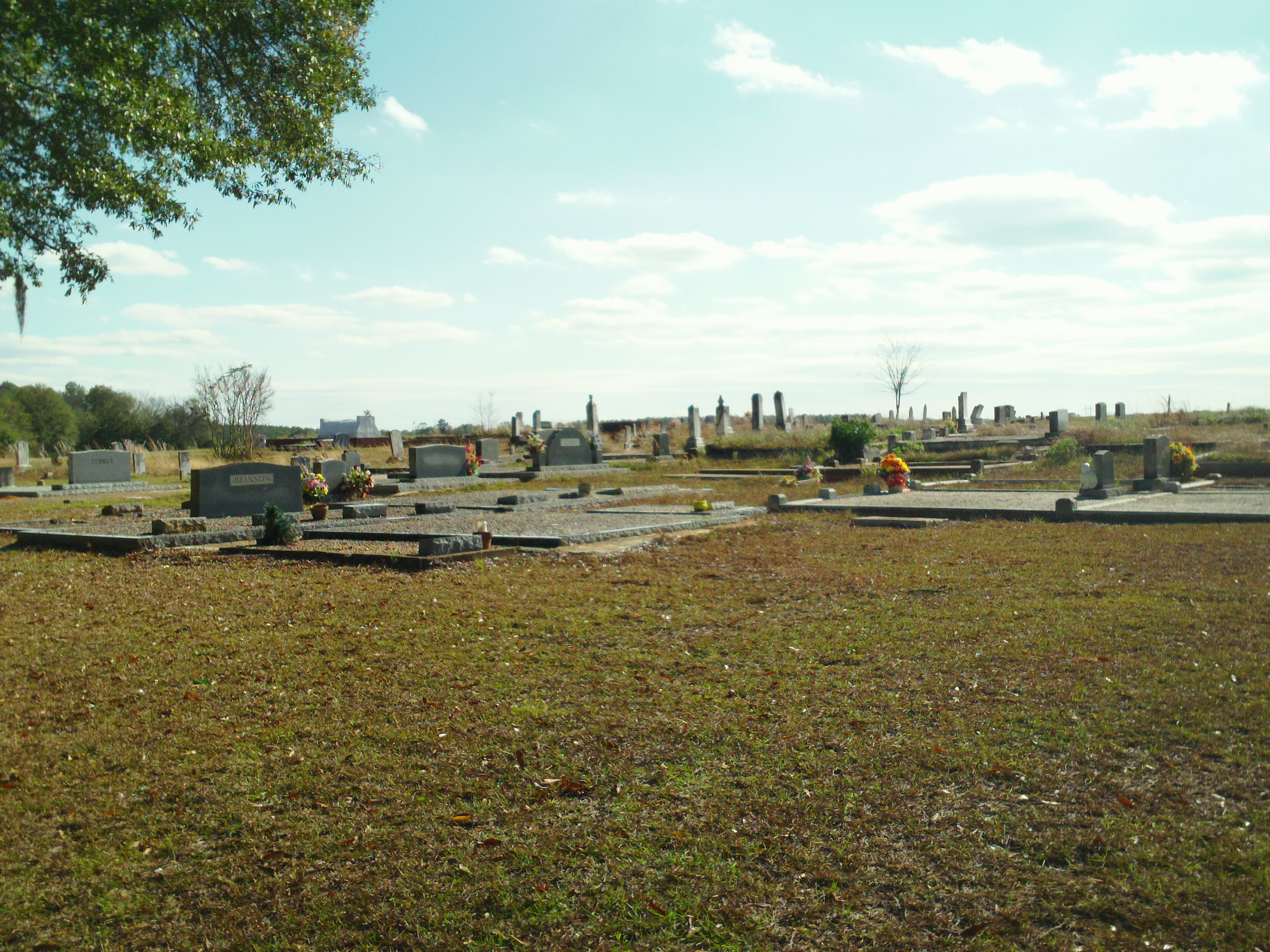
Harrison Cemetery, November 2011

Grancer was a successful cotton planter, and is said to have owned the largest number of slaves in the county. He hosted barbecues, dances, and horse races every Thursday possible. He loved these things so much that he had his slaves build a large dance hall just for the parties he sponsored. Grancer had a pair of clogs, or dancing shoes, that he wore just for the parties he loved so well.

The years passed and Harrison was faced with the fact that he would not live forever, so he began to prepare for his final arrangements. Slaves were forced to travel to the brick kiln in Milton, Florida, and return with loads of brick. Work began on the large above-ground tomb in which he intended to be buried. In a last act of excess, Harrison was to be buried in the tomb with his dancing clothes and his clogs on, lying on his feather bed. The burial site was within earshot of his beloved dance hall so he could still be a part of it in some way. The end for Harrison finally came in 1860 and his burial orders were followed exactly. The Thursday night dances continued for a while, but without Harrison, the mood just was not the same, and the dance hall soon fell into ruin. Then, people began to tell tales of passing the Harrison Cemetery late on a Thursday night and hearing the eerie sounds of fiddling and dancing coming from the cemetery. Other stories had passers-by reporting of hearing the deep, booming voice of a man calling out square dances and being accompanied by a fiddle.

== Grancer Name Origin ==
Grancer Harrison would have been given the name "Grancer" by his many children and grandchildren. The nickname "Grancer" was actually very commonly given to a grandfather in the region of South Carolina from which hailed Grancer Harrison. Grancer was an affectionate term, in common use at the time by immigrants from Western Britain to the Carolinas. The term refers to a grand sire—which means grand father.

== Vandalism ==
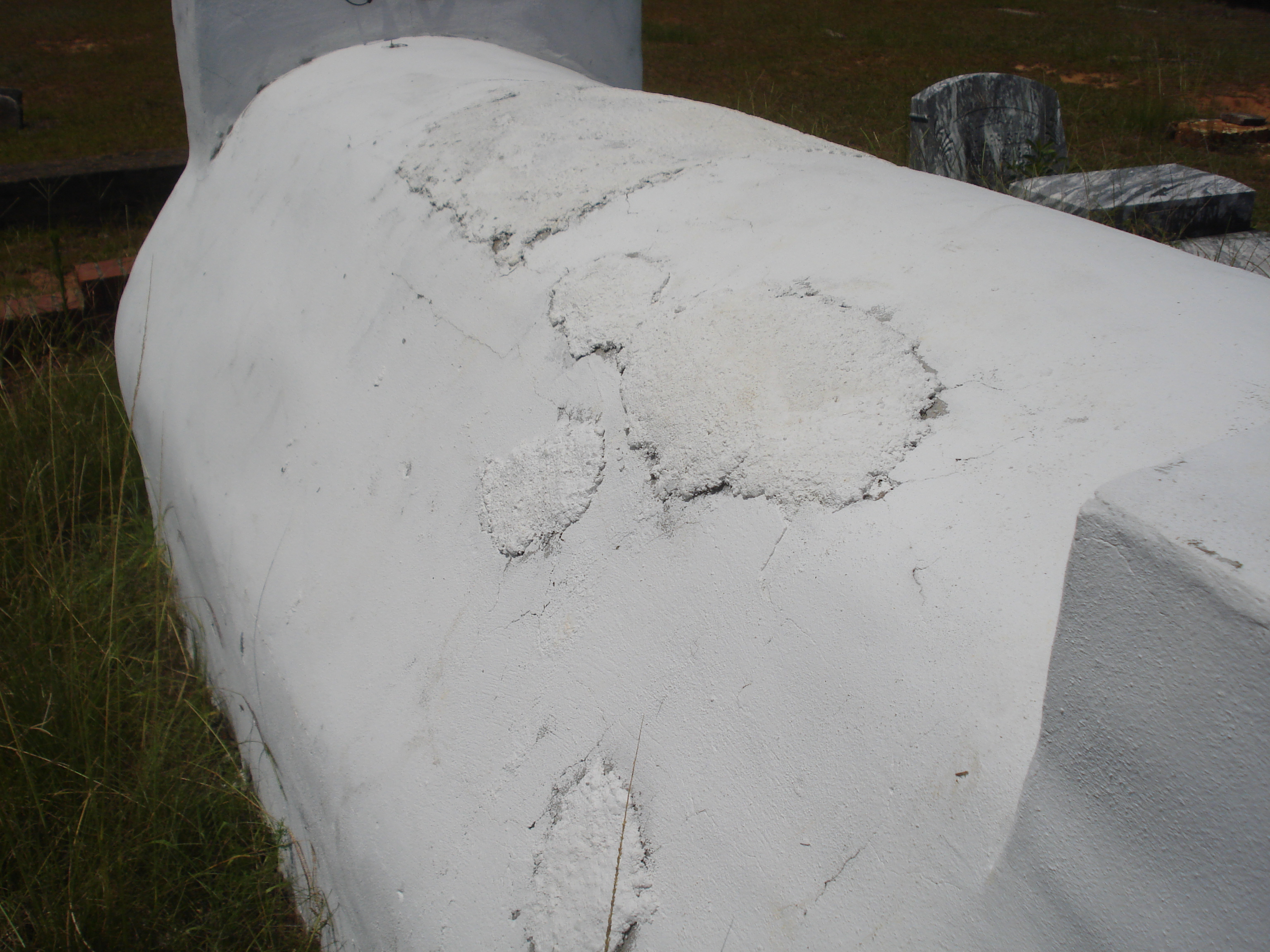
Patched Vandalism in 2011.

Another tale concerning Harrison's grave claimed that Grancer had a large sum of gold buried with him, and still others claimed that he buried gold near the old dance hall. Vandals solved the mystery of the gold in his tomb in 1964 when they blew it open with dynamite. No gold was found and they succeeded only in destroying the tomb and scattering Harrison's skeletal remains.

The Harrison Cemetery along with Harrison's Grave was again vandalized on July 30, 2010. About 50 headstones were overturned.

== See also ==
- Reportedly haunted locations in Alabama
