= William Harrison (cricketer, born 1838) =

English cricketer, coal industrialist, and British Army officer

Personal information
- Full name: William Bealey Harrison
- Born: 16 January 1838; Norton Hall, Staffordshire, England
- Died: 23 March 1912 (aged 74); Wall, Staffordshire, England
- Relatives: William Harrison (son)

Career statistics
Competition	First-class
Matches	2
Runs scored	6
Batting average	1.50
100s/50s	0/0
Top score	5
Balls bowled	72
Wickets	1
Bowling average	60.00
5 wickets in innings	0
10 wickets in match	0
Best bowling	1/31
Catches/stumpings	2/–
- Source: Cricinfo, 24 October 2019

William Bealey Harrison DL JP (16 January 1838 – 23 March 1912) was an English first-class cricketer, coal industrialist and British Army officer.

The son of William Harrison, he was born at Norton Hall in Staffordshire in January 1838. He was educated at Rugby School. Harrison was commissioned in the Staffordshire Rifle Volunteer Corps as a lieutenant in February 1860. Shortly after he made two appearances in first-class cricket for the Gentlemen of the North against the Gentlemen of the South in 1861 at The Oval and 1862 at Nottingham. He was promoted to the rank of captain in April 1863, later resigning his commission in December 1873. He was in business in the coal mining industry in Walsall, in addition to being a member of the Mining Association of Great Britain for many years. Harrison served as the High Sheriff of Staffordshire in 1897. He died in March 1912 at Wall, Staffordshire. His son, William junior, was also a first-class cricketer.
