= 13 Alabama Ghosts and Jeffrey =

1969 book of ghost stories

- First edition image
- Author: Kathryn Tucker Windham; Margaret Gillis Figh
- Language: English
- Series: Jeffrey
- Genre: Folklore
- Publisher: Strode Publishers
- Publication date: 1969
- Publication place: United States
- Media type: Print (hardcover)
- Pages: 120 pp (1st edition)
- ISBN: 0-8173-0376-6
- OCLC: 16834379
- Followed by: Jeffrey Introduces 13 More Southern Ghosts

13 Alabama Ghosts and Jeffrey is a book first published in 1969 by folklorist Kathryn Tucker Windham and Margaret Gillis Figh. The book contains 13 ghost stories from the U.S. state of Alabama. The book was the first in a series of seven Jeffrey books, most featuring ghost stories from a Southern state. Jeffrey in the book's title refers to a ghost that allegedly haunts Windham's home.

== Origins of the book and Jeffrey ==
The foreword of the book describes how Windham came to be interested in ghost stories. It began with ghostly incidents in the Windham family home in Selma that Windham attributed to a spirit she dubbed "Jeffrey". At first, the family heard footsteps in rooms that would later be found empty. A supposed photograph of Jeffrey, included in the book, was taken inside the home. On the night the picture was made, some young people visiting the house decided to play with a ouija board, trying to contact Jeffrey. When they developed the photos taken that night, a shadowy, vaguely human-like shape was seen beside a girl in the photograph. Soon after it was taken, Windham contacted Figh, who was a noted collector of ghost stories, to ask about Jeffrey. Out of that meeting, the idea of 13 Alabama Ghosts and Jeffrey was born.

In the preface to the book, Windham says that although many ghost stories are told in Alabama, she wanted to choose stories for her book that had "entertained many generations" and were "a treasured part of Southern folklore". Windham sought stories from which she could describe not only the ghost, but also the community and lifestyles of the people who first reported the haunting. Windham spends as much time describing the people and places around the ghost stories as she does the ghost itself.

== Stories included ==
- The Ghost of the Angry Architect
- Death Lights in the Tower
- The Faithful Vigil at Carlisle Hall
- The Specter in the Maze at Cahaba
- The Phantom Steamboat of the Tombigbee
- The Unquiet Ghost at Gaineswood
- The Face in the Courthouse Window
- Mobile's Pipe-smoking Captain
- The Return of the Ruined Banker
- The Hole That Will Not Stay Filled
- Huntingdon College's Red Lady
- The Crying Spirit at the Well
- The Dancing Ghost of Grancer Harrison

== Reception ==
Despite being very popular in Alabama, the book attracted some controversy from certain Christians in the state who said that the book promoted beliefs incompatible with Christianity. In fact, Windham said that she had received letters from people telling her she is doomed to hell for writing the Jeffrey books. In an interview with The Birmingham News, Windham responded to these claims, saying, "If I'm going to hell — and I can't deny that, because it's not for me to judge — it won't be for telling ghost stories; I have far greater shortcomings than that."

== Adaptations ==
13 Alabama Ghosts and Jeffrey has been adapted into a stage musical by Don Everett Garrett and Kevin Francis Finn. Kathryn Tucker Windham gave her blessing for the adaptation and saw the premiere at Red Mountain Theatre Company's Cabaret Theatre in October 2010, prior to her death. The musical is now available to schools and arts organizations from the authors.
