= Nursling =

Village in Hampshire, England

Coordinates: 50°56′42″N 1°28′22″W

- Village
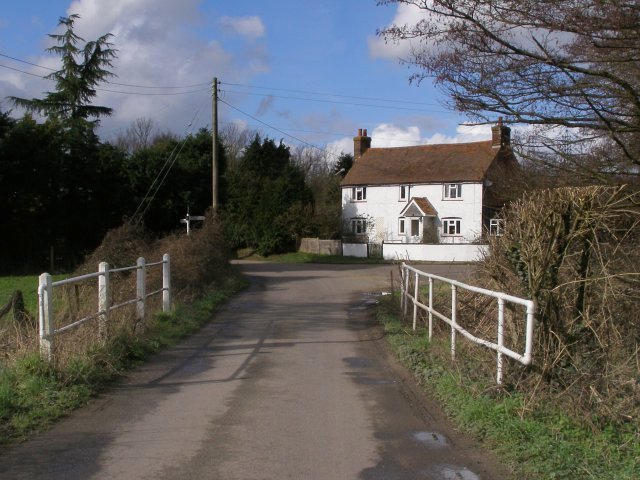
- Junction of Mill Lane and Station Road, Nursling

- Location within Hampshire
- Population: 5,137 (2011 Census)
- OS grid reference: SU371163
- Civil parish: Nursling and Rownhams
- District: Test Valley
- Shire county: Hampshire
- Region: South East
- Country: England
- Sovereign state: United Kingdom
- Post town: Southampton
- Postcode district: SO16
- Dialling code: 023
- Police: Hampshire and Isle of Wight
- Fire: Hampshire and Isle of Wight
- Ambulance: South Central
- UK Parliament: Romsey and Southampton North

Nursling is a village in the civil parish of Nursling and Rownhams, in the Test Valley district, in Hampshire, England, about 6 kilometres (3.7 miles) north-west of the city of Southampton. Formerly called Nhutscelle (in an 8th-century life of Saint Boniface), then Nutsall, Nutshalling or Nutshullyng until the mid-19th century, it has now been absorbed into the suburbs of Southampton, although it is not part of the district of Southampton (remaining part of the Test Valley borough).

== History ==
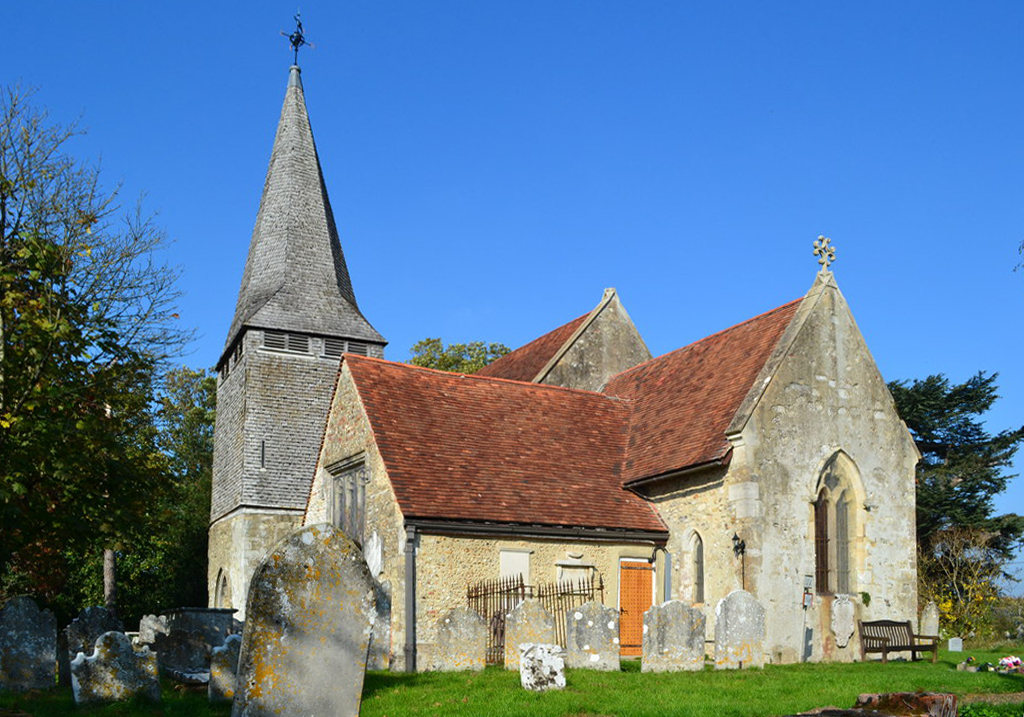
Church of St Boniface, Nursling, Hampshire

At (Nursling) Romans erected a bridge (probably a wooden one as no trace of stone abutments remains) across the River Test, below which it widens into its estuary, and there are traces of the Roman road from Nursling to Stoney Cross. At Nhutscelle a Benedictine monastery was established in 686, the earliest Benedictine establishment in Wessex according to Bede. It became a major seat of learning, and at the end of the 7th century, Winfrith (subsequently Saint Boniface) studied here under the abbot Winberht, producing the first Latin grammar to be written in England. He left in 710 for Canterbury, returning briefly around 716 before going to Germany as a missionary. The Danes destroyed the monastery in 878 and it was never rebuilt; its exact site has not been identified, though the parish church is dedicated to St. Boniface.

Thirty households lived in Hnutscilling, according to the Domesday Survey, belonging to the Bishop of Winchester.

The church of St. Boniface largely dates from the 14th century with some 13th century possibly Saxon material. It was restored over two years from 1881 and again in 1890.

A rectory was across the road from the church in 1778. It survives as Nursling House.

O. G. S. Crawford, the archeologist, lived in Nursling during World War II, and kept much rare material from the Ordnance Survey office in Southampton in his garage. This foresight saved much important historical material from destruction when the offices were burnt out in an air raid. The cricketer William Henry Harrison was born in Nursling.

In 1931 the civil parish had a population of 727. On 1 April 1932 the parish was abolished to form "Nursling and Rownhams".

== Present day ==
Nursling Industrial Estate, adjacent to the M271, houses several major businesses, such as Tesco, Norbert Dentressangle and Meachers, and is ably served by transport links, the motorway giving easy access to the Southampton container terminal, as well as the motorway links to London and the Midlands.

Nursling is also home to one of the two South Central Ambulance Service stations that serve the Southampton area.

Grove Place is a Grade I listed building in Nursling. Now converted into retirement apartments, the building was originally a country house and was converted into a lunatic asylum, Later it became a private school, the Northcliffe School for boys, then, later, the Atherley girls' school, before being developed for its present purpose.
