= Town Creek, Alabama =

- Town
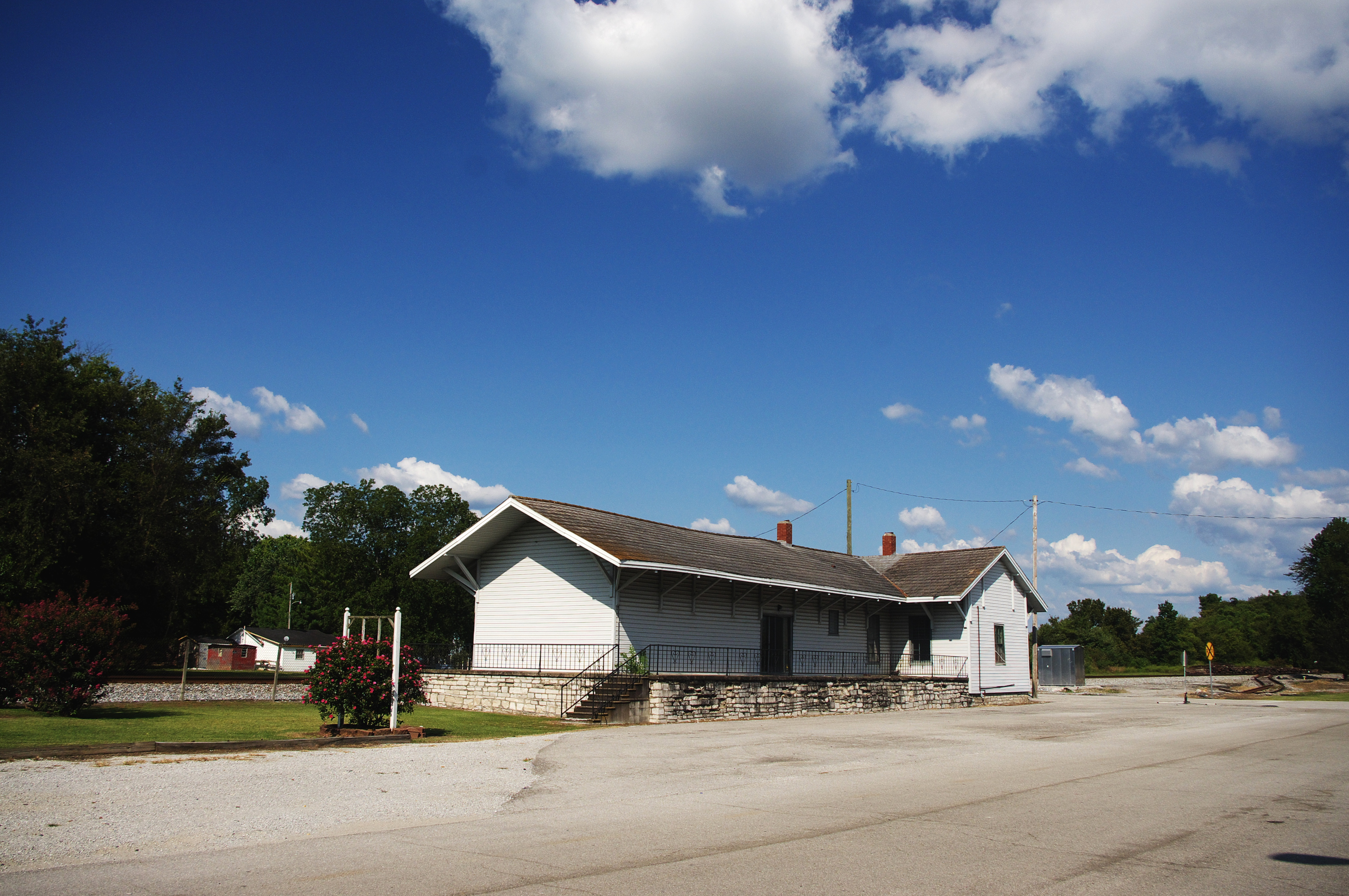
- Former train station in Town Creek

- Location of Town Creek in Lawrence County, Alabama.
- Coordinates: 34°40′19″N 87°24′23″W
- Country: United States
- State: Alabama
- County: Lawrence

Area
  - Total: 2.68 sq mi (6.95 km^{2})
  - Land: 2.68 sq mi (6.94 km^{2})
  - Water: 0.0039 sq mi (0.01 km^{2})
- Elevation: 571 ft (174 m)

Population (2020)
  - Total: 1,052
  - Density: 392.4/sq mi (151.51/km^{2})
- Time zone: UTC-6 (Central (CST))
  - Summer (DST): UTC-5 (CDT)
- ZIP code: 35672
- Area code: 256
- FIPS code: 01-76584
- GNIS feature ID: 2406744

Town Creek is a town in Lawrence County, Alabama, United States, and is included in the Decatur Metropolitan Area, as well as the Huntsville-Decatur Combined Statistical Area. It incorporated in March 1875. As of the 2020 census, the population of the town is 1,052, down from 1,100 in 2010. Since 1920, it has been the second largest town in Lawrence County after Moulton.

== History ==
Town Creek was established in the first half of the 19th century, and was originally known as "Jonesboro" after an early settler, William Jones. It incorporated in 1875.

Town Creek has one site listed on the National Register of Historic Places, the Goode-Hall House, to the north of town.

== Geography ==
Town Creek is concentrated around the intersection of U.S. Route 72 and State Route 101, southeast of Muscle Shoals and northwest of Decatur. The town of Courtland lies just to the east. State Route 101 connects Town Creek with Wheeler Dam, which spans the Tennessee River several miles to the north.

According to the U.S. Census Bureau, the town has a total area of 2.7 square miles (7.0 km^{2}), all land.

== Demographics ==
Historical population
Census	Pop.	Note	%±
1880	150		—
1890	201		34.0%
1900	280		39.3%
1910	344		22.9%
1920	405		17.7%
1930	427		5.4%
1940	637		49.2%
1950	763		19.8%
1960	810		6.2%
1970	1,203		48.5%
1980	1,201		−0.2%
1990	1,379		14.8%
2000	1,216		−11.8%
2010	1,100		−9.5%
2020	1,052		−4.4%
U.S. Decennial Census; 2013 Estimate

=== 2020 census ===
As of the 2020 census, Town Creek had a population of 1,052. The median age was 37.8 years. 24.4% of residents were under the age of 18 and 14.7% of residents were 65 years of age or older. For every 100 females there were 87.2 males, and for every 100 females age 18 and over there were 83.2 males age 18 and over.

0.0% of residents lived in urban areas, while 100.0% lived in rural areas.

There were 449 households and 265 families in Town Creek, of which 35.9% had children under the age of 18 living in them. Of all households, 33.6% were married-couple households, 17.8% were households with a male householder and no spouse or partner present, and 41.4% were households with a female householder and no spouse or partner present. About 28.8% of all households were made up of individuals and 12.3% had someone living alone who was 65 years of age or older.

There were 499 housing units, of which 10.0% were vacant. The homeowner vacancy rate was 1.1% and the rental vacancy rate was 4.8%.

Town Creek racial composition
Race	Num.	Perc.
White (non-Hispanic)	583	55.42%
Black or African American (non-Hispanic)	344	32.69%
Native American	13	1.24%
Asian	9	0.86%
Pacific Islander	1	0.09%
Other/Mixed	101	9.60%
Hispanic or Latino	37	3.52%

=== 2010 census ===
At the 2010 census there were 1100 people, 449 households, and 304 families in the town. The population density was 407.4 inhabitants per square mile (157.3/km^{2}). There were 512 housing units at an average density of 189.6 per square mile (73.2/km^{2}). The racial makeup of the town was 52.4% White, 36.0% Black or African American, 2.1% Native American, 0.1% Asian, 4.4% from other races, and 5.1% from two or more races. 6.5% of the population were Hispanic or Latino of any race. Of the 449 households 30.3% had children under the age of 18 living with them, 39.6% were married couples living together, 23.2% had a female householder with no husband present, and 32.3% were non-families. 29.4% of households were one person and 10.6% were one person aged 65 or older. The average household size was 2.45 and the average family size was 3.02.

The age distribution was 27.6% under the age of 18, 9.8% from 18 to 24, 22.8% from 25 to 44, 26.5% from 45 to 64, and 13.2% 65 or older. The median age was 37.1 years. For every 100 females, there were 84.3 males. For every 100 females age 18 and over, there were 87.1 males.

The median household income was $19120, and the median family income was $26667. Males had a median income of $35875 versus $26667 for females. The per capita income for the town was $12661. About 32.5% of families and 35.5% of the population were below the poverty line, including 44.4% of those under age 18 and 36.7% of those age 65 or over.

=== 2000 census ===
At the 2000 census there were 1216 people, 514 households, and 355 families in the town. The population density was 451.6 inhabitants per square mile (174.4/km^{2}). There were 563 housing units at an average density of 209.1 per square mile (80.7/km^{2}). The racial makeup of the town was 60.86% White, 34.21% Black or African American, 1.89% Native American, 0.16% Asian, 1.97% from other races, and 0.90% from two or more races. 3.62% of the population were Hispanic or Latino of any race. Of the 514 households 35.8% had children under the age of 18 living with them, 44.4% were married couples living together, 21.4% had a female householder with no husband present, and 30.9% were non-families. 30.2% of households were one person and 13.4% were one person aged 65 or older. The average household size was 2.37 and the average family size was 2.93.

The age distribution was 28.5% under the age of 18, 9.1% from 18 to 24, 27.1% from 25 to 44, 21.2% from 45 to 64, and 14.0% 65 or older. The median age was 34 years. For every 100 females, there were 84.0 males. For every 100 females age 18 and over, there were 73.8 males.

The median household income was $24583, and the median family income was $29018. Males had a median income of $30000 versus $20500 for females. The per capita income for the town was $14204. About 20.1% of families and 23.3% of the population were below the poverty line, including 33.4% of those under age 18 and 18.5% of those age 65 or over.

== Notable people ==
- Rilous Carter, vice president of Disney's Epcot
- John Douglas, former NBA player
- Chris Goode, former NFL player
- Kerry Goode, former NFL running back
- Don Jones, NFL player
- Antonio Langham, former NFL player
- Kalvin Pearson, NFL Free Agent
- Bob Penchion, former NFL player
- Mack Vickery, Nashville songwriter, singer, musician, and Alabama Music Hall of Fame Inductee 2003.
- Ali-Ollie Woodson, former Temptation (born in Detroit, but grew up in Town Creek)
