= William Harrison (cricketer, born 1866) =

English cricketer

Personal information
- Full name: William Henry Harrison
- Born: 1866; Nursling, Hampshire, England
- Died: 23 December 1936 (aged 69–70); Salisbury, Wiltshire, England
- Batting: Unknown

Domestic team information
- Years: Team
- 1902: Hampshire

Career statistics
Competition	First-class
Matches	1
Runs scored	12
Batting average	12.00
100s/50s	–/–
Top score	12*
Catches/stumpings	–/–
- Source: Cricinfo, 11 January 2010

William Henry Harrison (1866 — 23 December 1936) was an English first-class cricketer.

Harrison was born in at Nursling near Southampton in 1866. He made a single appearance in first-class cricket for Hampshire against Warwickshire at Bournemouth in the 1902 County Championship. Batting twice in the match, he was dismissed in Hampshire's first innings for 0 by Sam Hargreave, while in their second innings he was unbeaten on 12, as Hampshire narrowly lost by 8 runs. Harrison died at Salisbury in December 1936.
