= William Henry Harrison (businessman) =

United States Army general

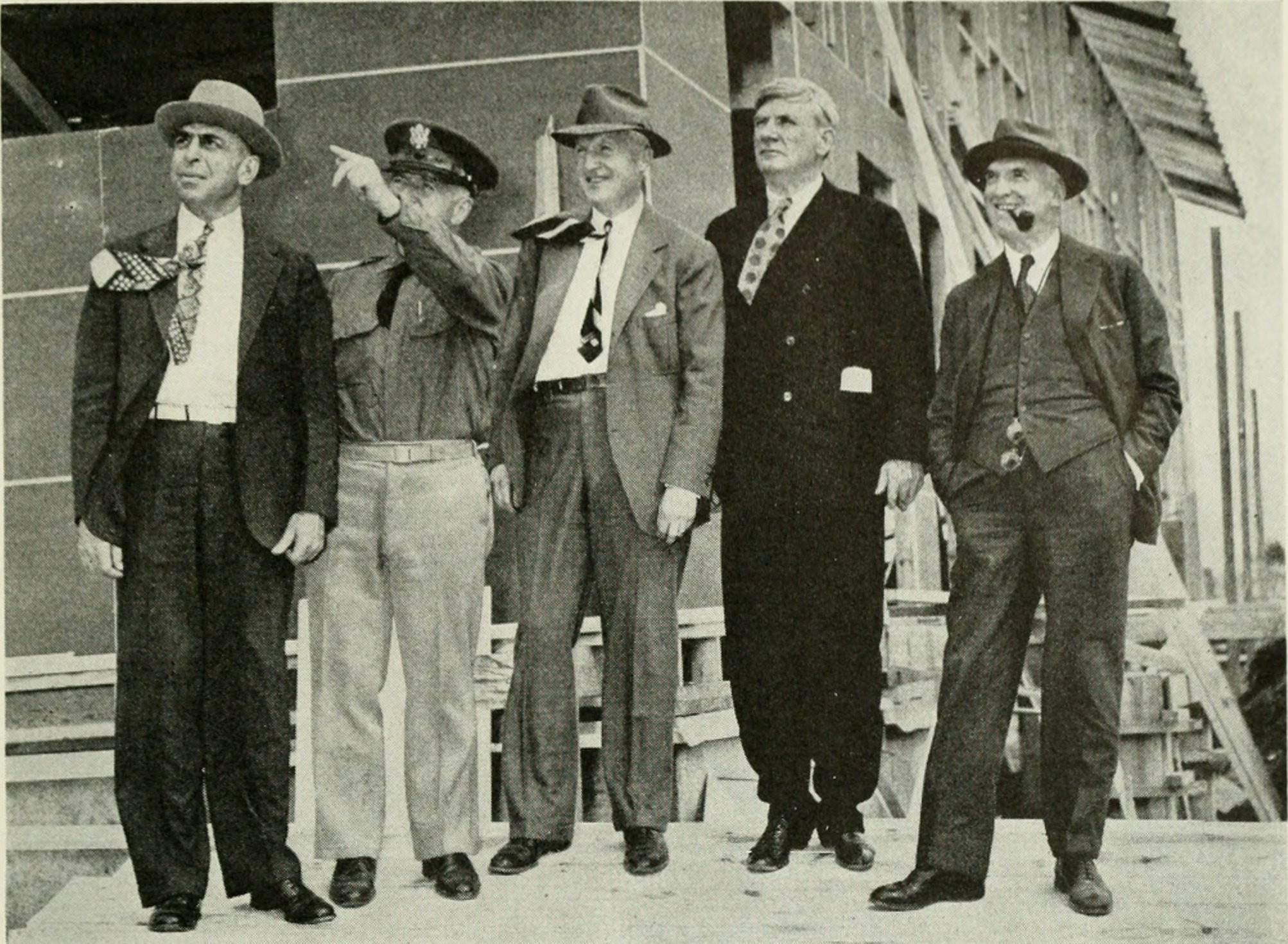
William H. Harrison (center) observing construction progress at a U.S. Army Camp in 1941

William Henry Harrison (1892 – April 23, 1956) was an American general (Major General of the United States Army) and businessperson.

Born in Brooklyn, William H. Harrison began his career in 1909, working with the New York Telephone Company, Western Electric and AT&T. In July 1940 he took a leave of absence from his position as vice president and chief engineer of AT&T when he was appointed to lead the construction division of the National Defense Advisory Commission. He was named chief of shipbuilding, construction and supplies in the Production Division of the newly created Office of Production Management in January 1941, and later that year he became the OPM's director of construction.

In July 1942 Harrison was commissioned a colonel in the U.S. Army, and he was soon promoted to brigadier general. He served as Director of Procurement for the United States Army Services of Supply. He was promoted to major general in July 1943, and given command of the Signal Corps Procurement and Distribution Service, responsible for all communications materiel of the U.S. Army and Army Air Forces. For his wartime service, Harrison received the U.S. Army Distinguished Service Medal, the Order of the British Empire (Honorary Commander), the French Legion of Honour (Officer) and the Hoover Medal.

After World War II Harrison returned to his position at AT&T. He was president of IT&T from 1948 until his death in 1956.
