= William Hendy Harrison =

English cricketer

William Hendy Harrison (27 May 1863 – 15 July 1939) was an English first-class cricketer, who played three matches for Yorkshire County Cricket Club, against Middlesex, Cambridge University and Sussex in 1888. His fourth and last first-class match was for the Players of United States of America, against the Gentlemen of Philadelphia, at the Germantown Cricket Club Ground, Manheim Street, Philadelphia in 1892.

Harrison was born in Shipley, West Riding of Yorkshire, and he scored 45 runs at 6.42 in his career, with a top score of 24 in his American match. His runs were in vain, as the Players of United States lost by an innings and 281, runs after Arthur Wood (182) and George Patterson (132) scored heavily for Philadelphia. Harrison conceded 18 runs with the ball, without taking a wicket.

He died in July 1939, in Lister Hills, Bradford, Yorkshire.
