= William Henry Harrison (architect) =

American architect

William H. Harrison (January 2, 1897 – May 15, 1988) was an American architect known for his work in Whittier, California.

Harrison was born in Richmond, Indiana. He married in 1922 and had two children. Harrison moved to California around 1927. He worked out of Whittier, California. He became a fellow at the American Institute of Architects in 1957.

He graduated with an architectural degree form Cornell University, worked as a draftsman with Starrett and Van Vleck, Architects in New York City in 1921 and as a designer with Bass Knowlton in Indianapolis, Indiana from 1922 until 1925. He also worked with Robert Frost Daggett in Indianapolis before moving to Los Angeles and working with Allison & Allison in Los Angeles, and with Roland Coate in 1929 and 1930 before establishing his own firm.

== Work ==
- A.H. Brannon House in La Habra, California
- Lou Henry Hoover Elementary School in Whittier (1938)
- Whittier High School (various buildings, including Vic Lopez Auditorium (1940))
- Whittier City Hall #2 (1955)
- National Trust and Savings Building, Whittier
- H.J. Schott House in Los Angeles
- El Rancho High School in Pico Rivera, California (1955)
- Whittier Public Library, Main Branch (1959)
