= Bill Harris =

Bill or Billy Harris may refer to:

== Music ==
- Bill Harris (trombonist) (1916–1973), American jazz trombonist
- Bill Harris (guitarist) (1925–1988), American guitarist with the vocal group The Clovers

== Politics ==
- Bill Harris (Ohio politician) (1934–2017), American state senator
- Bill Harris (Montana politician), member of the Montana State House of Representatives
- Bill Harris (Nebraska politician) (1939–2011), member of the Nebraska Legislature and mayor of Lincoln, Nebraska
- Bill Harris (lobbyist), American lobbyist

== Sports ==
- Bill Harris (1930s pitcher) (1900–1965), American baseball pitcher for the Reds, Pirates, and Red Sox
- Bill Harris (1950s pitcher) (1931–2011), Canadian baseball pitcher for the Dodgers
- Bill Harris (Australian footballer) (1877–1957), Australian footballer (Australian rules)
- Bill Harris (New Zealand footballer), New Zealand footballer
- Bill Harris (swimmer) (1897–1961), American swimmer
- Bill Harris (footballer, born 1918) (1918-1986), English footballer, see List of Oldham Athletic A.F.C. players (25–99 appearances)
- Bill Harris (Welsh footballer) (1928–1989), Welsh international footballer and manager
- Billy Harris (American football) (born 1946), American football player
- Billy Harris (baseball) (1943–2020), American baseball infielder
- Billy Harris (basketball) (1951–2010), American basketball player
- Billy Harris (ice hockey, born 1935) (1935–2001), Canadian ice hockey player for the Toronto Maple Leafs
- Billy Harris (ice hockey, born 1952), Canadian ice hockey player for the New York Islanders
- Billy Harris (rugby league) (born 1951), rugby league footballer for Wakefield Trinity and Oldham
- Billy Harris (rugby league, born 1992), rugby league footballer for Stanley Rangers, Castleford Tigers, and Dewsbury Rams
- Billy Harris (tennis) (born 1995), British tennis player

== Others ==
- Billy Harris (actor) (born 1994), British actor
- Bill Harris (aviator) (1916–2012), United States Army Air Force fighter ace
- Bill Harris (geneticist) (1944–2014), Scottish geneticist
- Bill Harris (journalist) (1943–2019), American journalist
- Bill Harris (neuroscientist) (born 1950), Canadian neuroscientist
- Bill Harris (television producer), American television executive

== See also ==
- William Harris
- William Harrison
- William Harries
