= William Harris =

William or Will or Willie Harris may refer to:

== Politicians and political activists ==
- William Harris (born 1504) (1504–?), MP for Newport, Cornwall
- William Harris (died 1556), MP for Maldon
- William Harris (MP, died 1709) (c. 1652–1709), English landowner and member of parliament for St Ives, and for Okehampton
- William Harris (Birmingham Liberal) (1826–1911), Liberal Party politician and strategist, architect, and writer, in Birmingham, England
- William Harris (civil rights leader) (1867–1931), Australian advocate for Aboriginal rights
- William Harris (Symbionese Liberation Army), 20th-century American militant
- William A. Harris (Kansas politician) (William Alexander Harris, 1841–1909), U.S. representative from Kansas
- William Alexander Harris (Virginia politician) (1805–1864), U.S. representative from Virginia
- William C. Harris (Illinois politician) (1921–2004), American politician
- William J. Harris (1868–1932), U.S. senator from Georgia
- William Littleton Harris (1807–1868), justice of the Mississippi Court of Errors and Appeals
- William L. Harris (1923–2013), American politician
- William James Harris (1835–1911), Conservative Party politician
- William R. Harris (1803–1858), justice of the Tennessee Supreme Court
- William Harris (New York politician), American businessman and politician from New York
- Bill Harris (lobbyist) (William D. Harris), American lobbyist

== Sportsmen ==
- William Harris (American football) (1965–2014), American football tight end
- Will Harris (American football), American football cornerback
- Bill Harris (swimmer) (William White Harris Jr., 1897–1961), American swimmer and Olympic bronze medallist
- William Harris (tennis) (1947–2002), American tennis player
- William Harris (cricketer, born 1861) (1861–1923), English cricketer
- William Harris (cricketer, born 1864) (1864–1949), English cricketer
- William Harris (cricketer, born 1883) (1883–1967), English cricketer
- William Harris (footballer) (1890–?), Scottish footballer
- William Harris (rugby union) (1876–1950), New Zealand rugby union player
- Will Harris (baseball) (born 1984), baseball player
- Willie Harris (born 1978), baseball player
- Will Harris (rugby union) (born 2000), Australian rugby union player
- Will Harris (footballer) (born 2000), English footballer
- Bill Harris (1930s pitcher) (William Milton Harris, 1900–1965), American baseball pitcher for the Reds, Pirates, and Red Sox
- Bill Harris (1950s pitcher) (William Thomas Harris, 1931–2011), Canadian baseball pitcher for the Dodgers
- Bill Harris (Australian footballer) (William James Harris, 1877–1957), Australian footballer (Australian rules)
- Bill Harris (New Zealand footballer) (William Harris), New Zealand footballer
- Bill Harris (Welsh footballer) (William Charles Harris, 1928–1989), Welsh international footballer and manager
- Billy Harris (American football) (William Andrew Harris Jr., born 1946), American football player
- Billy Harris (ice hockey, born 1935) (William Edward Harris, 1935–2001), Canadian ice hockey player for the Toronto Maple Leafs
- Billy Harris (ice hockey, born 1952) (William Edward Harris), Canadian ice hockey player for the New York Islanders

== Academics and religious figures ==
- William Harris (Presbyterian minister) (c.1675–1740), English divine
- William Harris (historian) (1720–1770), English dissenting minister and historian
- William Harris (academic) (1765–1829), president of Columbia University
- William C. Harris (historian), professor of history at North Carolina State University
- William Logan Harris (1817–1887), Bishop of the Methodist Episcopal Church
- William H. Harris (botanist) (1860–1920), Irish botanist
- William Henry Harris (academic) (1884–1956), Welsh divine, canon and treasurer of St David's Cathedral, and professor of Welsh at St David's College, Lampeter
- William Stewart Harris (1922–1994), English-born Australian anthropologist, journalist and Aboriginal rights advocate
- William V. Harris (born 1938), professor of history
- William Wadé Harris (c. 1860–1929), African evangelist
- William S. Harris, American professor and researcher on human nutrition

== Soldiers ==
- William Harris (colonist) (1757–1812), figure in the American Revolution
- William Harris, 2nd Baron Harris (1782–1845), British soldier and peer
- William Harris, American Civil War colonel, son of Ira Harris
- William M. Harris (1850–1878), Medal of Honor recipient for action in the Indian Wars
- William Frederick Harris (1918–1950), United States Marine Corps officer

== Engineers, inventors and scientists ==
- William Cornwallis Harris (1807–1848), English military engineer, artist and hunter
- Sir William Gordon Harris (1912–2005), British civil engineer
- William Snow Harris (1791–1867), invented a ship-borne lightning rod
- William Harris, former director general of Science Foundation Ireland
- Bill Harris (neuroscientist) (William Anthony Harris, born 1950), Canadian-born neuroscientist

== Others ==
- Will Harris (poet) (born 1989), British poet
- William Harris (beachcomber) (c. 1813–1889), British escaped convict and settler in pre-colonial Nauru
- William Harris (musician) (fl. 1927–1928), American country blues guitarist, singer, and songwriter
- William Harris (theatrical producer) (1844–1916), American theatre producer and vaudevillian performer
- William Harris (Tudor person) (1556–1616), English knight, landowner and incorporator in the third Virginia Company of London
- William Harris (settler) (1610–1681), founding settler of Providence, Rhode Island
- William Harris, 6th Earl of Malmesbury (1907–2000), British peer
- William Critchlow Harris (1854–1913), Canadian architect
- William C. Harris (police officer), assistant commissioner of the Metropolitan Police, 1856–1881
- Sir William Henry Harris (1883–1973), English organist and composer
- William H. Harris (orthopaedic surgeon) (born 1927), American orthopaedic surgeon
- William Laurel Harris (1870–1924), American muralist and editor
- William Lewarne Harris (1929–2013), English composer
- William Torrey Harris (1835–1909), United States Commissioner of Education, American educator, philosopher, lexicographer
- William Harris Jr. (1884–1946), Broadway theatrical producer
- Bill Harris (television producer) (William Harris), American television executive
- William Harris, founder of the Ottawa Citizen newspaper
- William Bevan Harris, British-American comic actor, better known as Billy Bevan
- Will Harris, the protagonist of the 2026 animated sports film Goat, voiced by Caleb McLaughlin

== See also ==
- Bill Harris (disambiguation)
- William Harries (disambiguation)
- William Hamlyn-Harris (born 1978), Australian javelin thrower
- William Harrison (disambiguation)
