= USCGC Benjamin Bottoms =

United States Coast Guard Vessel

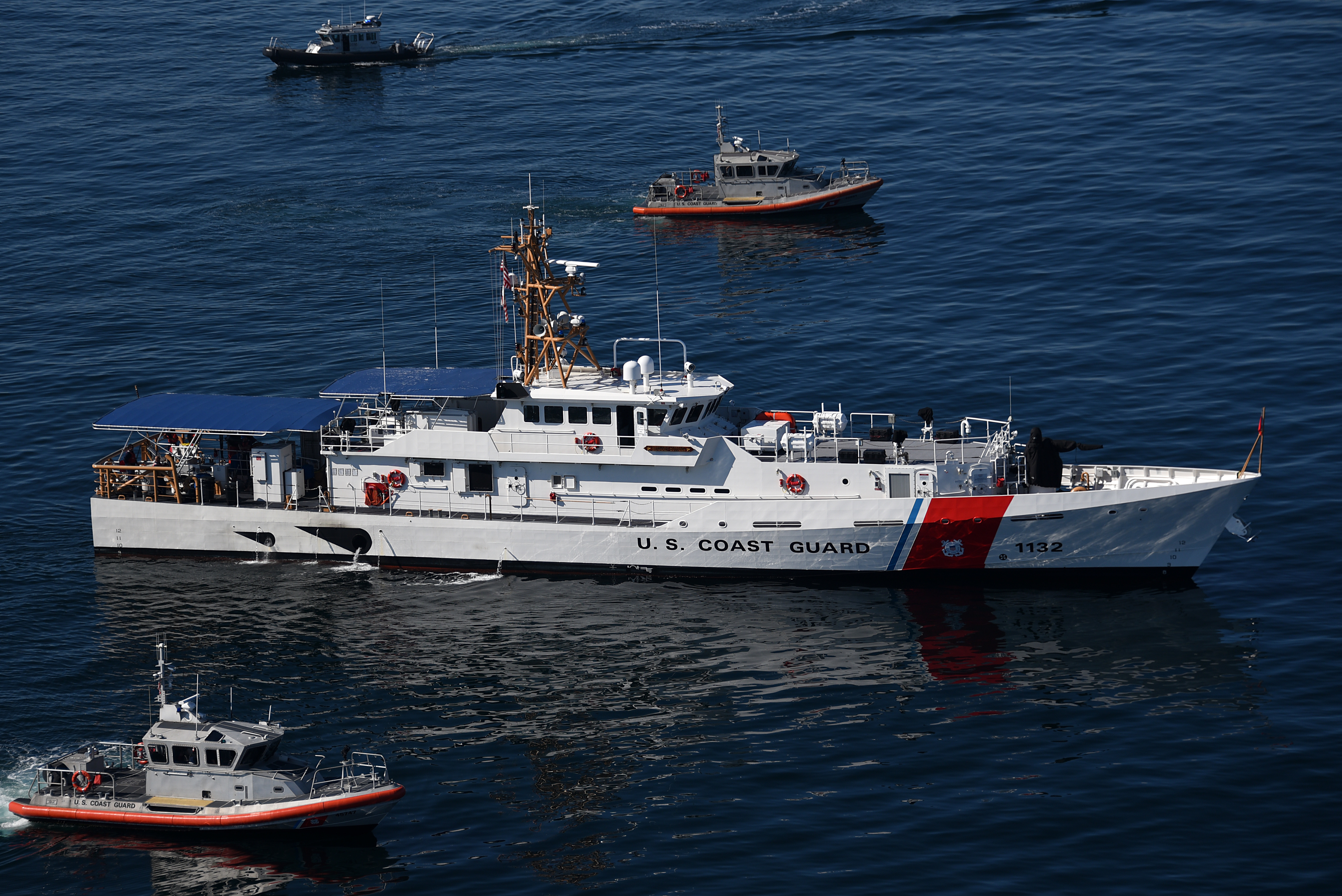
- Benjamin Bottoms arriving in Los Angeles

History

United States
- Name: USCGC Benjamin Bottoms
- Namesake: Benjamin A. Bottoms
- Operator: United States Coast Guard
- Builder: Bollinger Shipyards, Lockport, Louisiana
- Commissioned: May 1, 2019
- Home port: San Pedro, California
- Identification: MMSI number: 338926432; Callsign: NBNB; Hull number: WPC-1132
- Status: in active service
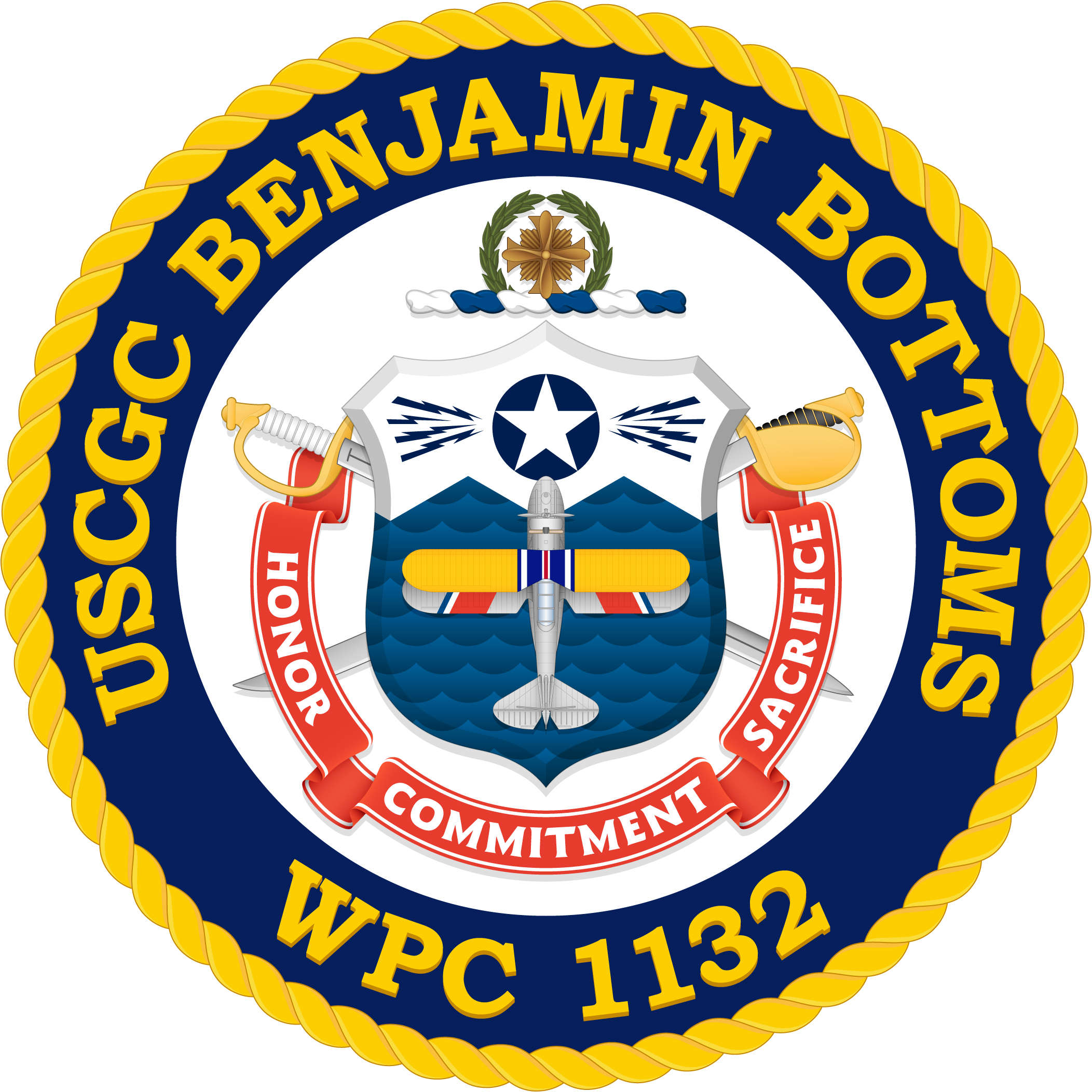
- Badge

General characteristics
- Class & type: Sentinel-class cutter
- Displacement: 353 long tons (359 t)
- Length: 46.8 m (154 ft)
- Beam: 8.11 m (26.6 ft)
- Depth: 2.9 m (9.5 ft)
- Propulsion: 2 × 4,300 kW (5,800 shp); 1 × 75 kW (101 shp) bow thruster
- Speed: 28 knots (52 km/h; 32 mph)
- Range: 2,500 nautical miles (4,600 km; 2,900 mi)
- Endurance: 5 days
- Boats & landing craft carried: 1 × Short Range Prosecutor RHIB
- Complement: 2 officers, 20 crew
- Sensors & processing systems: L-3 C4ISR suite
- Armament: 1 × Mk 38 Mod 2 25 mm automatic gun; 4 × crew-served Browning M2 machine guns

USCGC Benjamin Bottoms (WPC-1132) is the 32nd Sentinel-class cutter built for the United States Coast Guard. She is the fourth of four Fast Response Cutters homeported in San Pedro, California.

== Operational history ==
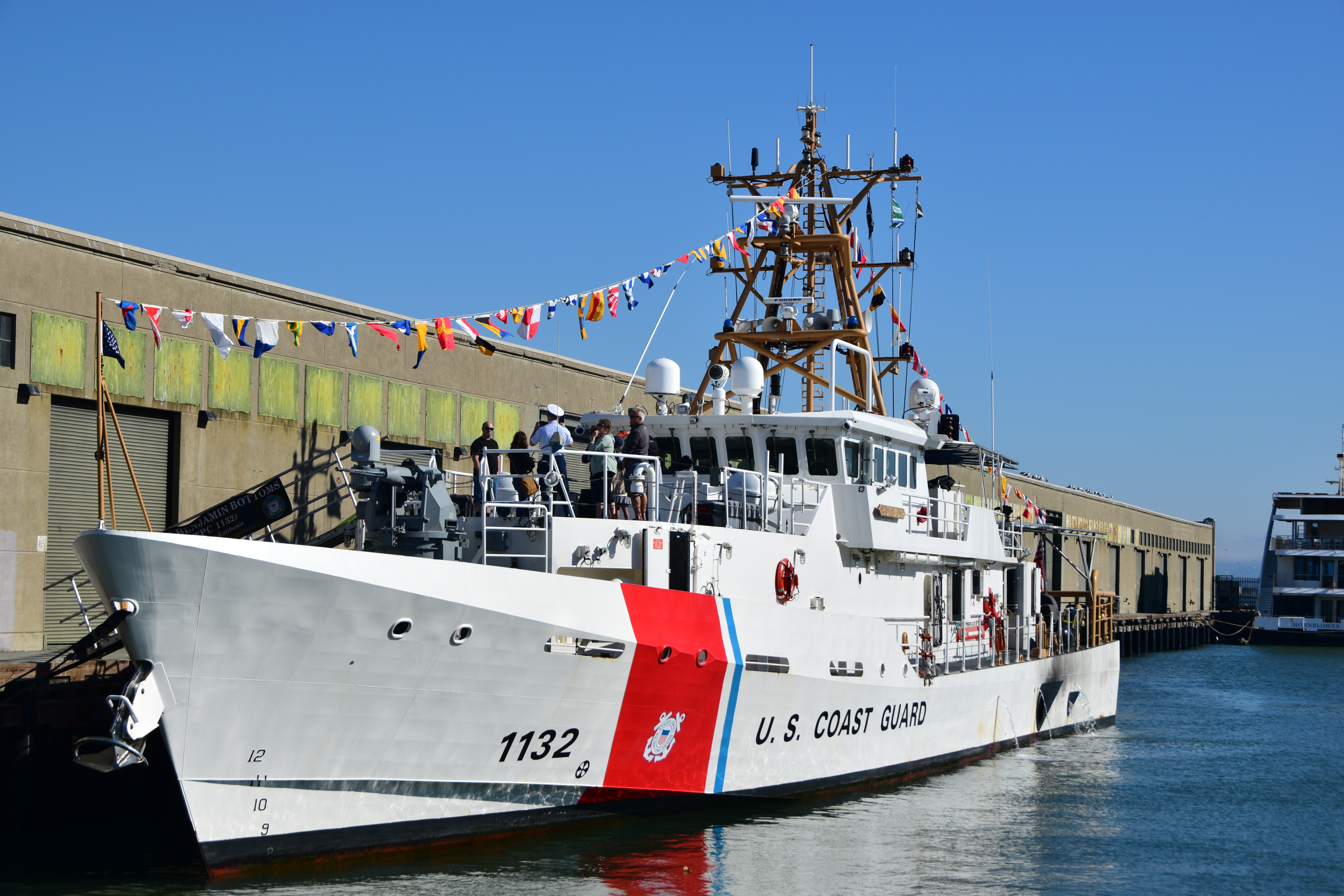
The Benjamin Bottoms in San Francisco during Fleet Week

The USCGC Benjamin Bottoms was placed in commission on 1 May, 2019 by ADM Charles Ray, vice commandant of the Coast Guard, with LT Lennie Day serving as her plank owner commander, who oversaw her fitting out from delivery.

On July 15, 2021, Benjamin Bottoms, along with Munro and Haddock, were diverted to extinguish a boat fire on the Relentless, seven miles west of Carlsbad, California.

Under the command of LT CDR Allice Gholson, Benjamin Bottoms participated in GALAPEX III from 23 June to 9 July, 2024, a joint training exercise centered around Ecuador's Galápagos Islands to gain greater cooperation and understanding with sailors from 14 partner nations in an effort to combat illegal fishing and other littoral violations. The Benjamin Bottoms transited over 7,500 nautical miles round trip across the Equator, spending 43 days deployed at sea as the only US surface asset to participate.

== Namesake ==
Benjamin Bottoms is named after Benjamin A. Bottoms, who died in November 1942 while attempting to rescue the crew of a crashed USAAF bomber. He was assigned on a Grumman J2F-4 Duck floatplane as the radioman, and after receiving a radio message that a B-17 crashed, and accompanied pilot John A. Pritchard to search for the downed plane. The pilot spotted the crashed bomber, and landed it as close to the wreak as possible. They were able to assist two of the injured crew back to their plane and back to the USCGC Northland. On their second trip, the plane encountered bad weather, causing the plane to crash, killing both men.
