= William Alexander Harris =

William Alexander Harris may refer to:

- William Alexander Harris (Virginia politician) (1805–1864), U.S. Representative from Virginia
- William Alexander Harris (Kansas politician), U.S. Representative and Senator from Kansas, and son of William Alexander Harris of Virginia

== See also ==
- William Harris (disambiguation)
