= Benjamin A. Bottoms =

United States Coast Guardsman (1913–1942)

Benjamin Bottoms
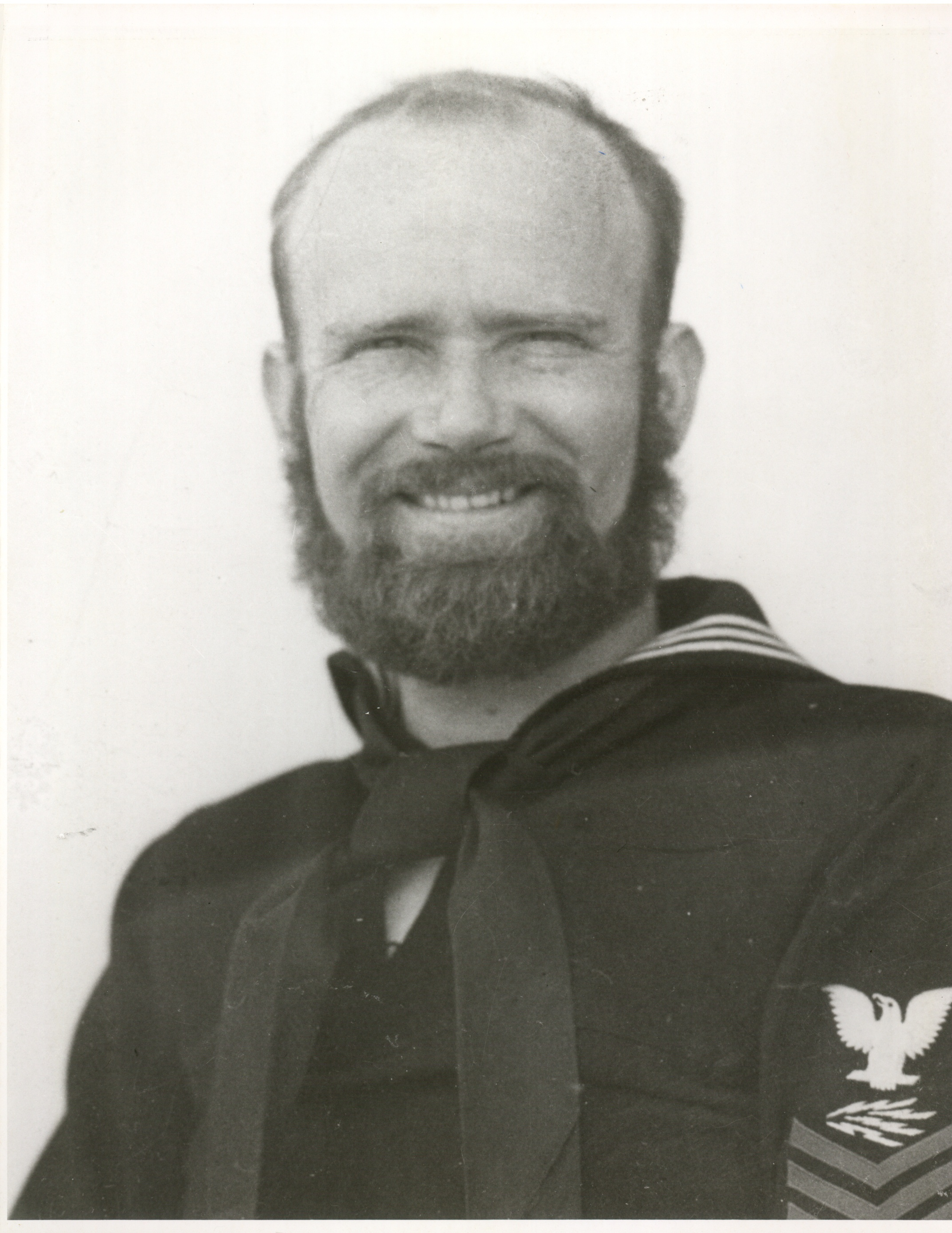
- Benjamin Bottoms
- Born: November 1, 1913; Cumming, Georgia, U.S.
- Died: November 28, 1942 (aged 29); Greenland
- Occupation: Coast Guardsman
- Known for: died during a rescue
- Awards: Distinguished Flying Cross (posthumous)

Benjamin Bottoms (November 1, 1913 – November 28, 1942) was a United States Coast Guardsman who died while attempting to rescue the crew of a USAAF bomber that had crashed-landed in Greenland in November 1942. Bottoms was the radioman of the USCGC Northland's Grumman J2F-4 Duck floatplane. When a B-17 bomber crash landed near Northland, Bottoms and pilot Lieutenant John A. Pritchard volunteered to search for it. They sighted the bomber, and landed as close to the wreck as possible—four miles away. Pritchard and Bottoms were able to assist two of the injured bomber crew to their plane, and take them back to Northland. However, on their second rescue visit they encountered bad weather, and crashed. Their bodies have never been found.

== Early life ==
Bottoms was born in Georgia in 1913, grew up on a farm near Marietta, Georgia, and graduated from Marietta High School in 1931. He enlisted in the United States Coast Guard in October 1932.

== Coast Guard career ==
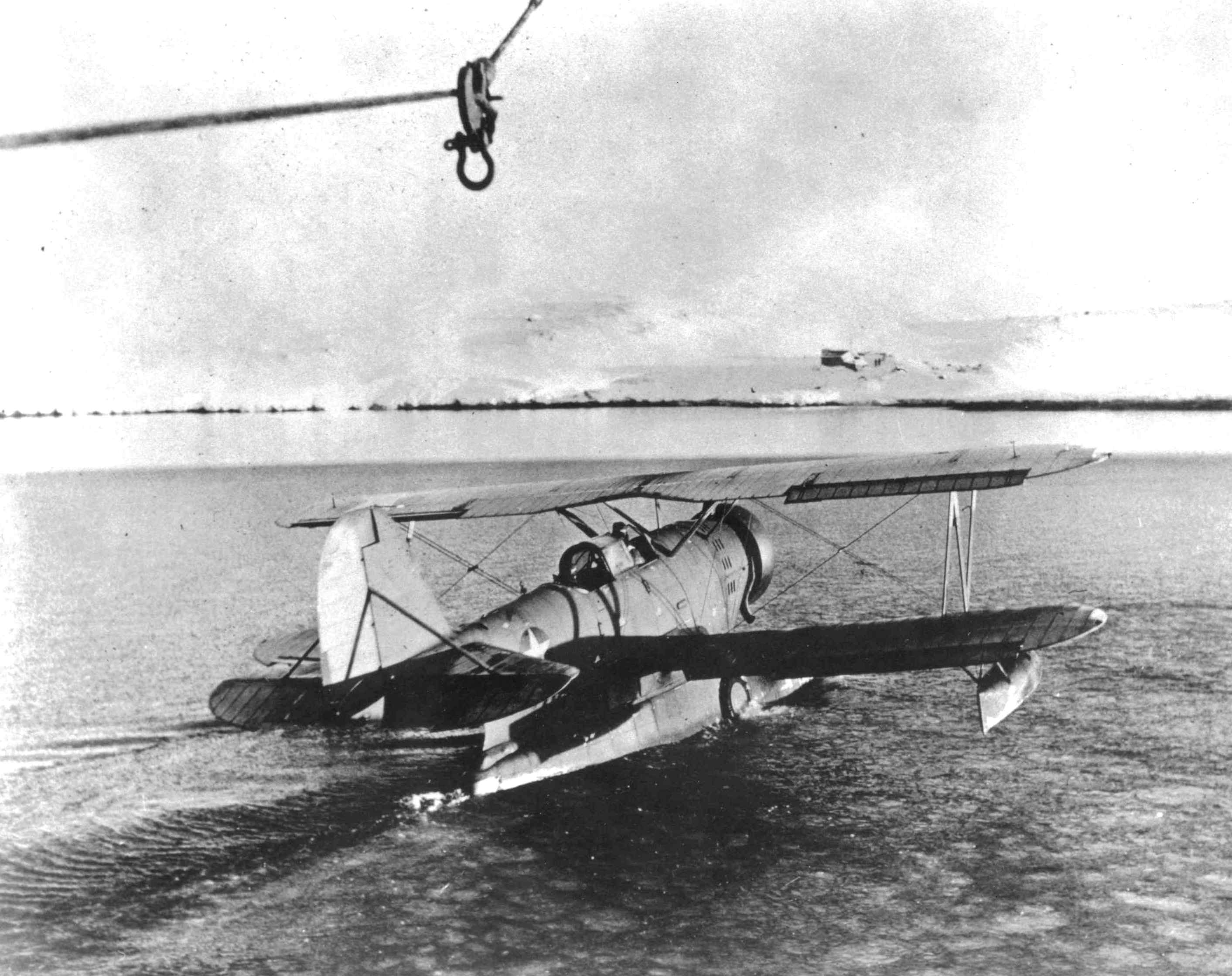
Bottoms was the radio operator of this small floatplane, a Grumman J2F-4 Duck.

In 1934 and 1935 he served on USCGC Ossipee and USCGC Guthrie. He was then able to complete radioman training, and served aboard USCGC Thetis, USCGC Harriet Lane and USCGC Ossipee. Bottoms was married on October 10, 1937. He received a shore assignment to Coast Guard Air Station Salem, from October 1939 to June 1941. He was then assigned to Northland as a radioman for its float plane.

Bottoms and his pilot Pritchard succeeded in landing on Greenland's icecap, on November 22, 1942, rescuing the three surviving crew members of an RCAF plane. This was the first time a Coast Guard aircraft had landed on the icecap.

On November 28, 1942, the pair were able to make one successful landing near a USAAF B-17 that had crash landed on the icecap, and had brought the two most injured crew members to Northland. Prior to their second landing an overland expedition to the downed B-17 had experienced its own disaster, with a sled falling into a crevasse. When Bottoms and Pritchard landed, and learned of this additional disaster they planned to take one more crew member to Northland, and return with Northland crew members to help search for members of the overland expedition. They took off successfully, but Northland's radioman heard their transmissions fade as they were struck by bad weather. After the weather cleared another plane found the wreck, and from above determined their crash had not been survivable.

The crew of the B-17 had been left with supplies, and no further attempts to rescue them were made until Spring, five months later.

== Search ==
Mitchell Zuckoff 2013 account of searches for the missing airmen, Frozen in Time: An Epic Story of Survival and a Modern Quest for Lost Heroes of World War II, was a bestseller. In January the plane was erroneously reported as found. As of 2018 searchers continue to look for the lost plane. The wreck had been spotted, from the air, in 1943, but copious snowfall, and the movement of the ice has made it hard to find. During the summer of 2018 searchers used ground penetrating radar.

== Legacy ==
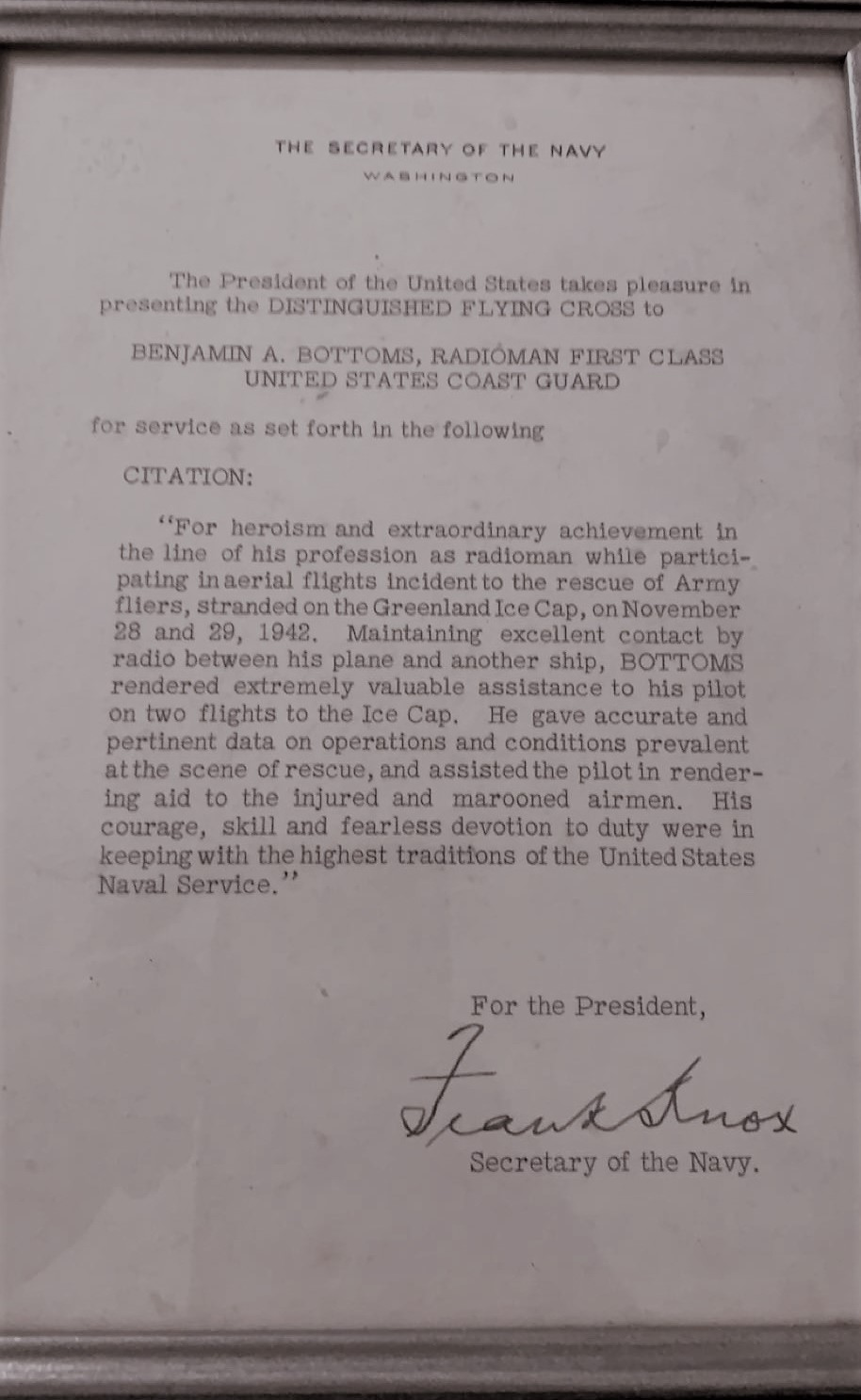
Distinguished Flying Cross recipient letter, dintisguishing himself by heroism or extraordinary achievement while participating in aerial flight.

At Coast Guard Aviation Training Center in Mobile, Alabama, a barracks and bachelor officer's quarters was dedicated as Pritchard-Bottoms hall in 1971.

In 2010, Master Chief Petty Officer of the Coast Guard Charles "Skip" W. Bowen, who was then the Coast Guard's most senior non-commissioned officer, proposed that all 58 cutters in the Sentinel class should be named after enlisted Coast Guardsmen, or one of its precursor services, who were recognized for their heroism. In 2015 the Coast Guard announced that Benjamin Bottoms would be the namesake of the 32nd cutter, USCGC Benjamin A. Bottoms. She was built at Lockport, Louisiana, by the Bollinger shipyards, and delivered to the Coast Guard on February 8, 2019. After completing her sea trials, the cutter will be the fourth Sentinel class cutter to be stationed in San Pedro, California, part of Los Angeles.

Radioman First Class Benjamin A. Bottoms, was awarded the Distinguished Flying Cross "for heroism and extraordinary achievement in the line of his profession as radioman while participating in aerial flights incident to the rescue of Army fliers, stranded on the Greenland Ice Cap, on November 28 and 29, 1942. Maintaining excellent contact by radio between his plane and another ship, Bottoms rendered extremely valuable assistance to his pilot on two flights to the Ice Cap. He gave accurate and pertinent data on operations and conditions prevalent at the scene of rescue, and assisted the pilot in rendering aid to the injured and marooned airmen. His courage, skill and fearless devotion to duty were in keeping with the highest traditions of the United States Naval Service."
