= Distinguished Flying Cross (United States) =

Military award of the US Armed Forces

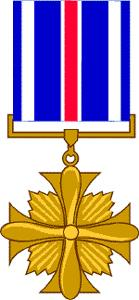
- Type: Military medal
- Awarded for: "Heroism or extraordinary achievement while participating in an aerial flight"
- Presented by: U.S. Department of the Army; U.S. Department of the Navy; U.S. Department of the Air Force; U.S. Department of Homeland Security
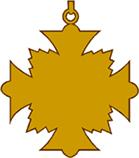
- Reverse
- Status: Currently awarded
- Established: 2 July 1926
- First award: 2 May 1927
- Service ribbon

Precedence
- Next (higher): Legion of Merit
- Next (lower): Army: Soldier's Medal; Naval Service: Navy and Marine Corps Medal; Air and Space Forces: Airman's Medal; Coast Guard: Coast Guard Medal

The Distinguished Flying Cross (DFC) is a military decoration of the United States Armed Forces. The medal was established on July 2, 1926, and is awarded to those who, after April 6, 1917, have distinguished themselves by single acts of heroism or extraordinary achievement while participating in aerial flight. Both heroism and extraordinary achievement are entirely distinctive, involving operations that are not routine. The medal may be awarded to friendly foreign military members in ranks equivalent to the U.S. paygrade of O-6 and below in combat or support operations.

== History ==
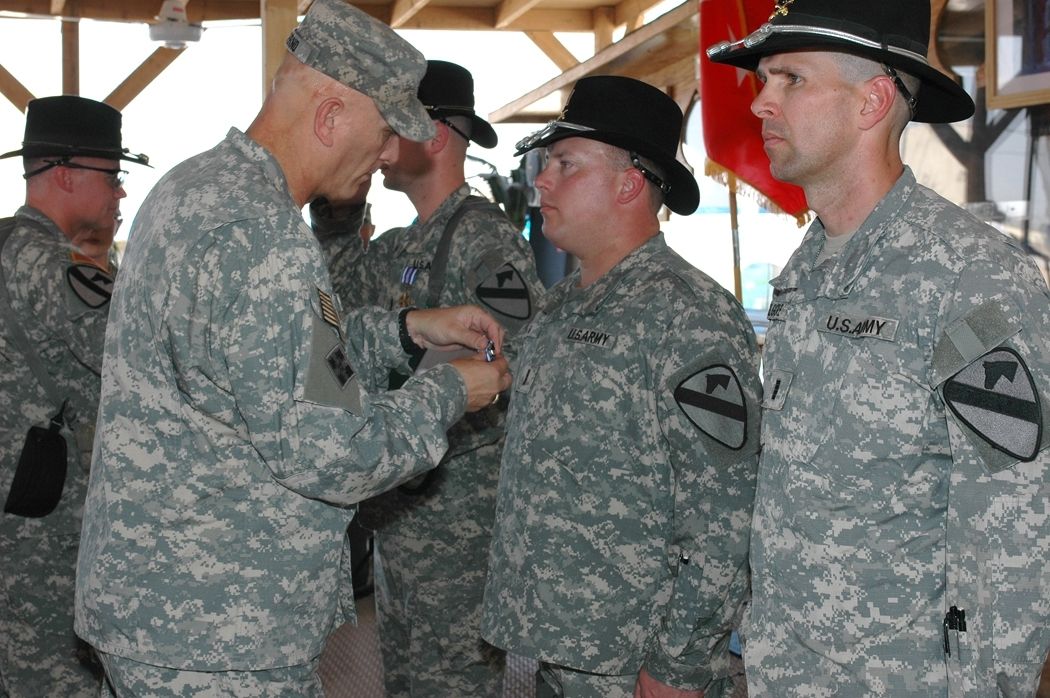
LTG Ray Odierno presents Distinguished Flying Crosses to Army aviators in Iraq.

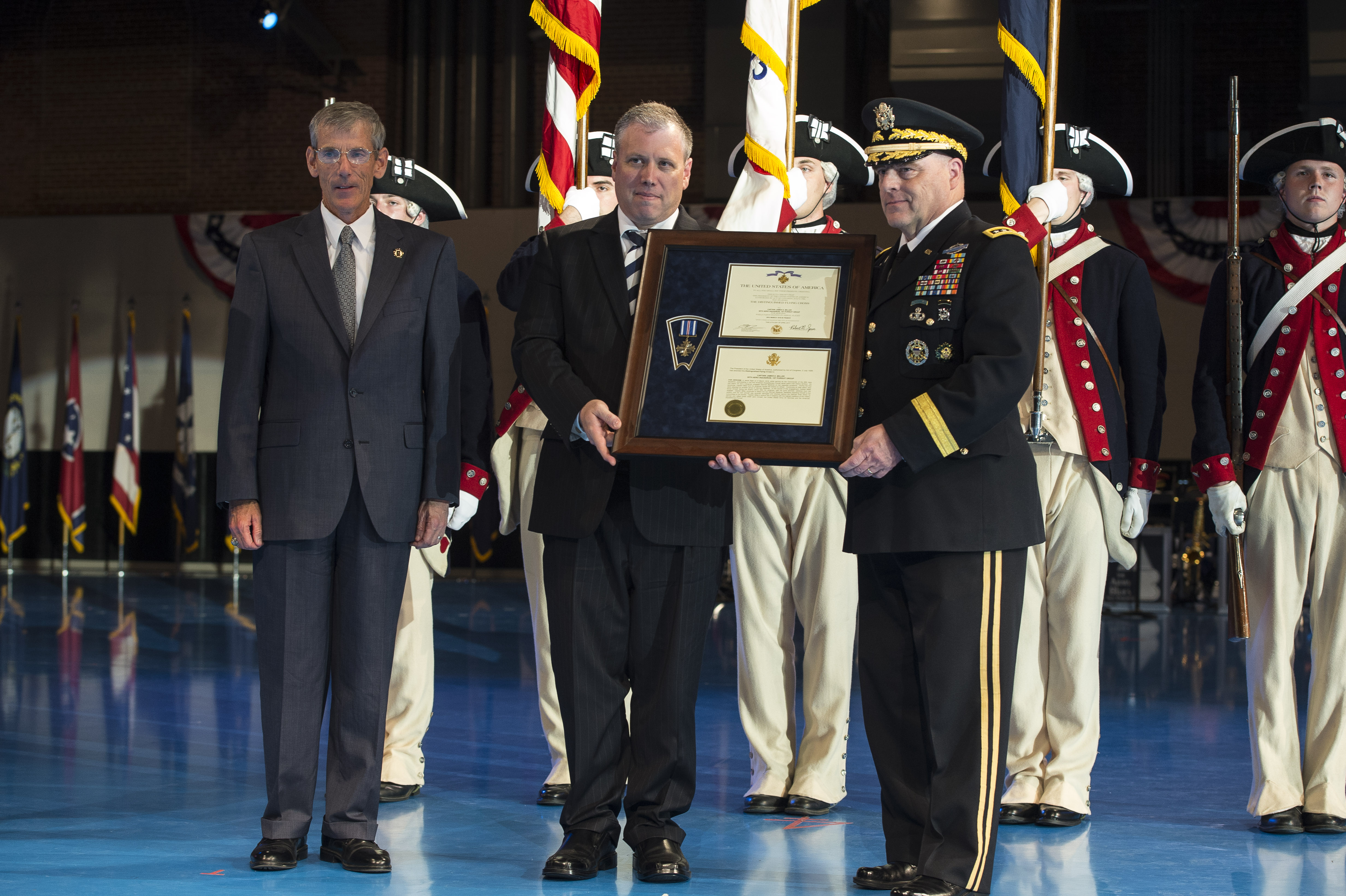
As part of a twilight tattoo event at Joint Base Myer-Henderson Hall, Va., held on honor of the Army's 242nd birthday, Acting Secretary of the Army Robert Speer, left, and Chief of Staff of the Army Gen. Mark A. Milley, right, present a posthumous Distinguished Flying Cross for Army Capt. James E. Miller to Miller's great-grandson, Byron Derringer, center, June 14, 2017.

The first award of the Distinguished Flying Cross was made by President Calvin Coolidge on May 2, 1927, to ten aviators of the U.S. Army Air Corps who had participated in the Army Pan American Flight which took place from December 21, 1926, to May 2, 1927. Two of the airmen died in a mid-air collision trying to land at Buenos Aires on February 26, 1927, and received their awards posthumously. The award had only been authorized by Congress the previous year and no medals had yet been struck, so the Pan American airmen initially received only certificates. Among the ten airmen were Major Herbert Dargue, Captains Ira C. Eaker and Muir S. Fairchild, and First Lieutenant Ennis C. Whitehead.

Charles Lindbergh received the first presentation of the actual medal about a month later from Coolidge during the Washington, D.C., homecoming reception on June 11, 1927, from his trans-Atlantic flight. The medal had hurriedly been struck and readied just for that occasion. The 1927 War Department General Order (G.O. 8) authorizing Lindbergh's DFC states that it was awarded by the president, while the General Order (G.O. 6) for the Pan American Flyers' DFC citation notes that the War Department awarded it "by direction of the President." The first Distinguished Flying Cross to be awarded to a Naval aviator was received by Commander Richard E. Byrd, USN for his trans-Atlantic flight from June 29 to July 1, 1927, from New York City to the coast of France. Byrd and his pilot Machinist Floyd Bennett had already received the Medal of Honor for their historic flight to the North Pole on May 9, 1926.

Numerous recipients of the medal earned greater fame in other occupations; a number of astronauts, actors, and politicians have been Distinguished Flying Cross recipients, including President George H. W. Bush. The DFC may be retroactively awarded to recognize notable accomplishments made at any time after the beginning of American participation in World War I. On February 23, 1929, Congress passed special legislation to allow the award of the DFC to the Wright brothers for their December 17, 1903, flight. Other civilians who have received the award include Wiley Post, Jacqueline Cochran, Roscoe Turner, Amelia Earhart, Glenn H. Curtiss, and Eugene Ely. Eventually, it was limited to military personnel by an Executive Order. Amelia Earhart became the first woman to receive the DFC on July 29, 1932, when it was presented to her by Vice President Charles Curtis in Los Angeles for her solo flight across the Atlantic Ocean earlier that year.

== World War I ==
The only Distinguished Flying Cross for World War I service was posthumously awarded on June 14, 2017, when 95th Aero Squadron Commander and Army Captain James Ely Miller was recognized for his actions on March 9, 1918, which made him the first American aviator serving with an American unit to die in that war.

== World War II ==
During World War II, the medal's award criteria varied widely depending on the theater of operations, aerial combat that was engaged in, and the missions that were accomplished. In the Pacific, commissioned officers were often awarded the DFC, while enlisted men were given the Air Medal. In Europe, some crews received it for their overall performance through a tour of duty. The criteria used were however not consistent between commands or over time. Individual achievement could also result in the medal being awarded. For example, George McGovern received one for the successful completion of a bombing mission in which his aircraft lost an engine and then was landed safely. On December 28, 1944, Aleda Lutz became the first military woman to receive the DFC, which she received posthumously.

== Criteria ==
The Distinguished Flying Cross was authorized by Section 12 of the United States Army Air Corps Act enacted by Congress on July 2, 1926, as amended by Executive Order 7786 on January 8, 1938 and USC 10, 9279. This act provided for the award to be given to any person who distinguishes themselves "by heroism or extraordinary achievement while participating in an aerial flight" while serving in any capacity with the Air Corps.

== Appearance ==
The Distinguished Flying Cross was designed by Elizabeth Will and Arthur E. DuBois. The medal is a bronze cross pattee, on whose obverse is superimposed a four-bladed propeller, 1 11/16 inches in width. Five rays extend from the reentrant angles, forming a one-inch square. The reverse is blank; it is suitable for engraving the recipient's name and rank. The cross is suspended from a rectangular bar.

The suspension and service ribbon of the medal is 1 3/8 inches wide and consists of the following stripes: 3/32 inch Ultramarine Blue 67118; 9/64 inch White 67101; 11/32 inch Ultramarine Blue 67118; 3/64 inch White 67101; center stripe 3/32 inch Old Glory Red 67156; 3/64 inch White 67101; 11/32 inch Ultramarine Blue 67118; 9/64 inch White 67101; 3/32 inch Ultramarine Blue 67118.

=== Devices ===
Additional awards of the Distinguished Flying Cross are shown with bronze or silver Oak Leaf Clusters for the Army, Air Force, and Space Force, and gold and silver 5/16 Inch Stars for the Navy, Marine Corps, and Coast Guard.

The Army, Air Force, Space Force, Navy, and Marine Corps may authorize the "V" device for wear on the DFC to denote valor in combat. The services can also award the DFC for extraordinary achievement without the "V" device.

On January 7, 2016, a Secretary of Defense memorandum standardized the use of the "V" device as a valor-only device across the services. The Department of Defense published "DOD Manuals 1348.33, Volumes 1-4, DOD Military Decorations and Awards" which unified the criteria for awards. DOD 1348.33. "Army Regulation 600-8-22, Military Awards" authorizes use of the "V" Device with the DFC for combat valor and the "C" Device for meritorious service or achievement under combat conditions.

== DFC National Memorial Act ==
In July 2014, the United States Senate passed the Distinguished Flying Cross National Memorial Act. The act was sponsored by Senator Barbara Boxer, to designate the Distinguished Flying Cross Memorial at March Field Air Museum adjacent to March Air Reserve Base in Riverside, California, as a national memorial to recognize members of United States Armed Forces who have distinguished themselves by heroism in aerial flight. The act was signed into law by President Barack Obama on July 25, 2014.

== Notable recipients of the DFC ==
This is not a complete list, as it does not include individuals who are known only for receiving the DFC.

Note: the rank indicated is the highest ever held by the person.

=== Astronauts ===
- Lieutenant General Thomas P. Stafford, USAF: flew to the Moon on Apollo 10, commander of the Apollo–Soyuz mission.
- Major General Michael Collins, USAF: command module pilot for Apollo 11 mission to the Moon.
- Major General Joe Engle, USAF: X-15 and Space Shuttle pilot.
- Rear Admiral Alan Shepard, USN: one of the original seven American astronauts, first American in space in Freedom 7, commanded Apollo 14.
- Brigadier General James McDivitt, USAF: commander of Gemini 4 and Apollo 9.
- Brigadier General Buzz Aldrin, USAF: Lunar Module pilot for Apollo 11, second man to walk on the Moon.
- Colonel Frank Borman, USAF: commander of Apollo 8.
- Colonel Eileen Collins, USAF: first woman to command a Space Shuttle mission.
- Colonel Gordon Cooper, USAF: one of the original seven American astronauts, pilot of Faith 7 and commander of Gemini 5.
- Colonel Guy Gardner: Space Shuttle pilot and recipient of three DFCs.
- Colonel John Glenn, USMC: (5 awards) One of the original seven American astronauts, first American to orbit the Earth in Friendship 7 and United States Senator.
- Colonel David Scott, USAF: flew on Gemini 8, Apollo 9 and Apollo 15.
- Captain Eugene Cernan, USN: pilot of Gemini 9A, lunar module pilot of Apollo 10 and commander of Apollo 17. One of three persons to have flown to the Moon twice.
- Captain Pete Conrad, USN: commander of Apollo 12 and Skylab 2.
- Captain Robert Crippen, USN: pilot on first Space Shuttle mission.
- Captain Mark Kelly, USN: pilot on four Space Shuttle missions, commander for two, including the final mission of Space Shuttle Endeavour, and recipient of 2 DFCs.
- Captain Scott Kelly, USN: Lived for one year on the International Space Station.
- Captain Jim Lovell, USN: pilot of Gemini 7, Commander of Gemini 12, Command Module Pilot of Apollo 8, and Commander of Apollo 13, recipient of 2 DFCs.
- Captain Wally Schirra, USN: one of the original seven American astronauts who flew on Sigma 7, Gemini 6A and as commander of Apollo 7.
- Captain John Young, USN: flew on Apollo 10 and Apollo 16, commander of the first Space Shuttle mission.
- Lieutenant Colonel Duane Carey, USAF: Space Shuttle pilot. Awarded with Valor Device.
- Lieutenant Colonel Gus Grissom, USAF: one of the original seven American astronauts, second American in space on Liberty Bell 7.
- Commander Scott Carpenter, USN: one of the original seven American astronauts, flew on Aurora 7, and aquanaut with SEALAB project.
- Major Deke Slayton, USAF: one of the original seven American astronauts, NASA chief astronaut and docking module pilot for the Apollo–Soyuz mission.
- Commander Joe F. Edwards Jr., USN: He was decorated before becoming an astronaut with the STS-89 mission, following his successful carrier landing of his F-14B after the radome had been separated mid-flight, injuring him and having to perform the landing with a blinded eye.
- Neil Armstrong: Commander of Apollo 11, first person to walk on the moon. Armstrong was a civilian throughout his tenure at NASA.

Note: Although astronaut Neil Armstrong's achievements as an aviator and an astronaut more than exceeded the requirements for the DFC, he was a civilian for his entire career with NASA, requiring an act of Congress to award the medal.

=== Political figures ===
- Lieutenant George H. W. Bush, USNR: President of the United States.
- Major General Patrick J. Hurley, USAR: Secretary of War.
- Rear Admiral Jeremiah Denton, USN: US Senator.
- Brigadier General Joe Foss, ANG: Medal of Honor recipient and Governor of South Dakota.
- Colonel Bruce Sundlun, USAFR: Governor of Rhode Island.
- Colonel Lloyd Bentsen, USAFR: US Senator, Secretary of the Treasury, and vice presidential candidate.
- Colonel Alexander Butterfield, USAF: aide to President Richard Nixon.
- Captain John S. McCain, III, USN: US Senator and presidential candidate.
- Captain Jim Wright, USAAF: Speaker of the US House of Representatives.
- Captain Bruce Alger, USAAF: US Representative.
- Captain Peter H. Dominick, USAAF: US Senator.
- Captain William Hathaway, USAAF: US Senator.
- Captain Joseph McCarthy, USMC: US Senator.
- Captain Gentner Drummond, USAF: Attorney General of Oklahoma.
- First Lieutenant George McGovern, USAAF: US Senator, presidential candidate.
- First Lieutenant Ted Stevens, USAAF: US Senator.
- First Lieutenant Richard Harding Poff, USAAF: US Representative.
- First Lieutenant John Ehrlichman, USAAF: aide to President Richard Nixon.
- First Lieutenant Brendan Byrne, USAAC: Governor of New Jersey.

=== Civilians ===
- Glenn Curtiss: aircraft designer. Posthumously awarded in 1933.
- Amelia Earhart: legendary aviator. First woman to receive the DFC by an Act of Congress in 1932.
- Eugene Burton Ely: first person to make a ship-board landing in an aircraft. Posthumously awarded in 1933.
- Harold Gatty: Navigator with Wiley Post on record-breaking around the world flight. Awarded in 1932.
- Wiley Post: completed record-breaking around-the-world flight and was the first person to fly solo around the world. Awarded in 1932.
- Roscoe Turner: flamboyant air racing champion. Presented in 1952. (Last award of the DFC to a civilian.)
- Orville Wright: aviation pioneer. Awarded by Act of Congress on December 18, 1928.
- Wilbur Wright: aviation pioneer. Posthumously awarded by Act of Congress on December 18, 1928.

=== Foreign citizens ===
- Wing Commander James Blackburn RAF: distinguished British pilot during World War II.
- Wing Commander A. Warburton, RAF: distinguished British reconnaissance pilot during World War II.
- Squadron Leader Robert Stanford Tuck, RAF: distinguished British pilot and flying ace during World War II
- Colonel Francesco De Pinedo: Regia Aeronautica: completed the Four Continents Flight in a flying boat in 1927.
- Lieutenant Colonel Dieudonné Costes: French Army: completed around the world flight.
- Lieutenant Commander Joseph Le Brix: French Navy: completed around the world flight.
- Commandant James Fitzmaurice: Irish Air Corps. Flew on first non-stop westward crossing of the Atlantic Ocean on the Bremen.
- Major Georgy Parshin, Soviet Air Forces: Soviet fighter ace, twice Hero of the Soviet Union.
- Major Arthur Chin, Republic of China Air Force: Chinese-American fighter ace.
- Captain Hermann Köhl: German Army: flew on first non-stop westward crossing of the Atlantic Ocean.
- Baron Ehrenfried Günther Freiherr von Hünefeld: German aristocrat: flew on first non-stop westward crossing of the Atlantic Ocean.
- Col. Jesus Villamor, Philippine Army Air Corps for actions during the defense of the Philippines, December 1941.
- Lt. Jose Gozar, Philippine Army Air Corps for actions during the defense of the Philippines, December 1941

=== Celebrities ===
- Brigadier General James Stewart, USAFR: World War II B-24 pilot and Group Operations Officer. Academy Award-winning actor.
- Brigadier General Chuck Yeager, USAF: test pilot and first human to break the sound barrier.
- Lieutenant Colonel Jerry Coleman, USMC: World War II and Korean War pilot. Second baseman for the New York Yankees and long-time broadcaster for the San Diego Padres.
- Major Clark Gable, USAAF: Star of Gone with the Wind who flew on five bombing missions during World War II.
- Major Wolfgang Reitherman, USAAF: World War pilot. Animator, director and producer for Disney animated movies.
- Captain Don Herbert, USAAF: World War II B-24 pilot. Creator and host of the Watch Mr. Wizard and Mr. Wizard's World television programs.
- Captain Gene Roddenberry, USAAF: Creator of the Star Trek television series and franchise.
- Captain Dan Rowan, USAAF: P-40 Warhawk pilot and star of Laugh In.
- Captain Cal Worthington, USAAF: Legendary car salesman.
- First Lieutenant Jack Valente, USAAF: Longtime president of the Motion Picture Association of America.
- Corporal Sabu Dastagir, USAAF: Indian-American actor who served as a B-24 tail gunner during World War II.

=== United States Air Force, Army Air Forces, and Army Air Corps ===
- General of the Air Force Henry H. Arnold, USAF: commander of the US Army Air Forces during World War II.
- General Samuel E. Anderson, USAF: commander of the 5th Air Force during the Korean War.
- General Jimmy Doolittle, USAF: leader of the Doolittle Raid.
- General Leon W. Johnson, USAF: leader in the Ploesti Raid and commander of the Continental Air Command.
- General George S. Brown, USAF: Chairman of the Joint Chiefs of Staff.
- General Ira C. Eaker, USAF: commander of the 8th Air Force during World War II.
- General Charles A. Gabriel, USAF: Chief of Staff or the U.S. Air Force, recipient of five DFCs.
- General Charles A. Horner, USAF: commander of United States Central Command air forces during the Gulf War.
- General Daniel James Jr., USAF: first African-American US Air Force four-star general.
- General David C. Jones, USAF: Chairman of the Joint Chiefs of Staff.
- General George C. Kenney, USAF: first commander of Strategic Air Command.
- General Curtis Lemay, USAF: Air Force Chief of Staff and vice presidential candidate.
- General Robert C. Mathis, USAF: Air Force Vice Chief of Staff, recipient of two DFCs - Korea and Vietnam.
- General Seth J. McKee, USAF: NORAD commander and D-Day veteran.
- General John C. Meyer, USAF: commander of Strategic Air Command. Seven DFCs
- General Richard B. Myers, USAF: Chairman of the Joint Chiefs of Staff.
- General Joseph W. Ralston, USAF: Supreme Allied Commander for NATO.
- General Carl Spaatz, USAF: first Chief of Staff of the United States Air Force.
- General Nathan F. Twining, USAF: Chairman of the Joint Chiefs of Staff.
- Lieutenant General Frank Maxwell Andrews, USAAF: died in an accident in 1943.
- Lieutenant General Royal N. Baker, USAF: flew combat missions in World War II, Korea and Vietnam.
- Lieutenant General Lewis H. Brereton, USAF: commander of the Ninth Air Force during World War II.
- Lieutenant General George H. Brett, USAF: commander of the Caribbean Defense Command in World War II.
- Lieutenant General Claire Lee Chennault, USAF: commander of the Flying Tigers.
- Lieutenant General Benjamin O. Davis Jr., USAF: first African-American US Air Force general.
- Lieutenant General Robert E. Kelley, USAF: Vietnam War combat pilot and USAFA Superintendent.
- Lieutenant General Elwood Richard Quesada, USAF: first commander of Tactical Air Command.
- Lieutenant General George E. Stratemeyer, USAF: commander of Far East Air Forces during the Korean War.
- Major General Orvil A. Anderson, USAF: participant in altitude record-setting Air Corps Stratospheric Balloon Flights in Explorer I and Explorer II in 1934 and 1935.
- Major General Frederick C. Blesse, USAF: Korean War double flying ace with ten victories, six DFCs
- Major General David M. Jones, USAF: Doolittle Raider and recipient of two DFCs.
- Major General Uzal Girard Ent, USAAF: leader of the Ploesti Raid.
- Major General Caleb V. Haynes, USAF: bomber commander of the China Air Task Force.
- Major General Frank O'Driscoll Hunter, USAAF
- Major General Robert Olds, USAAF: father of ace Robin Olds.
- Major General Robert A. Rushworth, USAF: X-15 pilot.
- Major General Clarence A. Shoop, USAAF: WWII observation pilot
- Major General Mele "Mel" Vojvodich, USAF: pilot for the CIA in Vietnam, three DFCs.
- Brigadier General Frederick Walker Castle, USAAF: four DFCs.
- Brigadier General E. Daniel Cherry, USAF: ten DFCs.
- Brigadier General Gerald Goodfellow, USAF: B-1 Lancer offensive systems officer, awarded the Distinguished Flying Cross for action during Operation Allied Force.
- Brigadier General Charles A. Lindbergh, USAFR: first person to fly solo across the Atlantic Ocean.
- Brigadier General Robin Olds, USAF: combat pilot in World War II and Vietnam War and recipient of six DFCs.
- Brigadier General Richard Stephen Ritchie, USAF: only USAF pilot to achieve ace status during the Vietnam War, with five kills.
- Brigadier General Elliott Roosevelt, USAAF: son of President Franklin Roosevelt.
- Brigadier General Robert Lee Scott Jr., USAF: fighter pilot who earned three DFCs.
- Brigadier General Dale E. Stovall, USAF: Vietnam War CSAR pilot who rescued Roger Locher, deepest rescue inside North Vietnam.
- Brigadier General Kenneth M. Taylor, USAF: one of the few American fighter pilots to get airborne during the attack on Pearl Harbor.
- Brigadier General Paul Tibbets, USAF: pilot of the Enola Gay.
- Colonel Bernt Balchen, USAF: pilot of the first plane to fly over the South Pole.
- Colonel Kim Campbell, USAF: for successfully completing her mission supporting ground troops over Baghdad in April 2003 and successfully landing her A-10 back at base despite sustaining severe damage to her aircraft.
- Colonel Jacqueline Cochran, USAFR: multiple record-setting aviator, first woman to break the sound barrier and commander of the Women Airforce Service Pilots (WASPs) during World War II.
- Colonel George Day, USAF: POW during the Vietnam War.
- Colonel Merlyn Hans Dethlefsen, USAF: Vietnam War F-105 pilot.
- Colonel Bernard F. Fisher, USAF: Vietnam War A-1 Skyraider pilot.
- Colonel James P. Fleming, USAF: Vietnam War helicopter pilot.
- Colonel Joe M. Jackson, USAF: combat veteran of World War II, the Korean War and the Vietnam War.
- Colonel Nelson P. Jackson, USAAF: commander of the 64th Fighter Wing, World War II.
- Colonel John R. Kane, USAF: leader in the Ploesti Raid.
- Colonel Gabby Gabreski, USAF: highest scoring American ace in the European Theater with 34 kills. Recipient of 13 DFCs.
- Colonel Jose L. Holguin, USAF: Silver Star recipient and POW during World War II.
- Colonel James K. Johnson, USAF: Korean war ace with 11 kills. Recipient of three DFCs.
- Colonel Charles H. MacDonald, USAF: recipient of six DFCs.
- Colonel Ashley Chadbourne McKinley, USAF: Photographer on first flight over the South Pole.
- Colonel Russell Maughan, USAAF: completed first "dawn to dusk" transcontinental flight.
- Colonel Robert J. "Shorty" Rankin, USAAF: first pilot in 56th FG with 5 aerial victories in one day; awarded 4 DFCs.
- Colonel David C. Schilling, USAF: recipient of 11 DFCs.
- Colonel Lowell Smith, USAAF: conducted first aerial refueling and commanded first aerial circumnavigation of the globe.
- Colonel Robert E. Thacker, USAF: pilot of record-breaking flight from Honolulu to New York and recipient of three DFCs.
- Colonel Leo K. Thorsness, USAF: Medal of Honor recipient and Vietnam War veteran.
- Lieutenant Colonel Lee Archer, USAF: first African-American fighter ace.
- Lieutenant Colonel Leaford Bearskin, USAF: veteran of World War II and Korea and also Chief of the Wyandotte Nation.
- Lieutenant Colonel Everett Ernest Blakely USAF: B-17 Pilot in WW II. Received this medal after a bombing mission to Trondheim, Norway.
- Lieutenant Colonel Louis Edward Curdes USAAF: Recipient of two DFCs. One of only three American WW II pilots to shoot down German, Italian and Japanese planes. He also intentionally shot down an American plane.
- Lieutenant Colonel George A. Davis, USAF: high-scoring Korean War ace.
- Lieutenant Colonel Bill Harris (aviator) USAF: WW2 Triple ace fighter pilot.
- Lieutenant Colonel Michael J. Novosel, USAFR: Vietnam War helicopter pilot, Medal of Honor recipient, three DFCs.
- Lieutenant Colonel Robert S. Johnson, USAFR: recipient of nine DFCs.
- Lieutenant Colonel Arthur W. Murray, USAF: early jet test pilot.
- Lieutenant Colonel Dick Rutan, USAF: piloted first unrefueled non-stop around the world flight. Recipient of five DFCs.
- Lieutenant Colonel Albert William Stevens, USAAF: participant in both the Explorer I and Explorer II stratospheric balloon flights.
- Lieutenant Colonel Boyd Wagner, USAAC: first Army Air Corps ace of World War II.
- Lieutenant Colonel Ray Shuey Wetmore, USAAF: 21 aerial victories during World War II. Received six DFCs.
- Lieutenant Colonel Gerald O. Young, USAF: Vietnam War helicopter pilot.
- Lieutenant Colonel Jay Zeamer Jr., USAF: World War II Medal of Honor recipient.
- Lieutenant Colonel Dan "Two Dogs" Hampton, USAF: received four DFC's as a "Wild Weasel" surface-to-air missile killer.
- Major Richard Bong, USAAF: highest-scoring American ace of World War II.
- Major Horace S. Carswell Jr., USAAF: World War II bomber pilot.
- Major George Andrew Davis Jr., USAF: Ace in both World War II and the Korean War. Four DFCs.
- Major Charles J. Loring Jr., USAF: World War II POW and Korean War F-80 Shooting Star pilot.
- Major Thomas McGuire, USAAF: second highest-scoring American ace in World War II with 38 kills. Six DFCs.
- Major John T. Godfrey, USAAF: shot down 18 German aircraft.
- Major Louis J. Sebille, USAF: Korean War F-51 Mustang pilot, two DFCs.
- Major Joseph Thompson Jr., USAAF: Aerial reconnaissance pilot with 90 missions, most behind enemy lines.
- Major MJ Hegar, USAF: Second female recipient during combat search and rescue mission in Afghanistan.
- Major George Welch, USAAF: one of the few American fighter pilots to get airborne during the attack on Pearl Harbor.
- Captain Carl Ally, USAAF: advertising executive and founder of Ally & Gargano.
- Captain Alan "Ace" Cozzalio, US Army: helicopter pilot, (4, 3 Oak leaf clusters)
- Captain Kenneth H. Dahlberg, USAAF: business executive and figure in the Watergate scandal, recipient of two DFCs.
- Captain Joseph Elsberry, Member of the Tuskegee Airmen. Destroyed three enemy aircraft over France in a single mission on July 12, 1944, and a fourth aircraft on July 20, 1944, becoming the first African American fighter pilot to do so.
- Captain Hawthorne C. Gray, USAAC: died during altitude record breaking balloon ascent in 1927.
- Captain Joseph Kittinger, USAF: seven DFCs, served three tours in Vietnam and holder of the highest free-fall parachute jump record for 52 years.
- Captain Ken Kavanaugh, USAAF: Professional football player.
- Captain Thomas Mantell, KYANG: died in pursuit of a UFO.
- Captain Francis Gary Powers, USAF: captured by Soviets when his U-2 spy plane was shot down in 1960.
- Captain Edward L. Toppins, member of the famed Red Tails/Tuskegee Airmen with 4 confirmed aerial kills.
- Captain John S. Walmsley Jr., USAF: Korean War B-26 pilot.
- Captain Hilliard A. Wilbanks, USAF: Vietnam War O-1 pilot and Medal of Honor recipient.
- Captain Louis Zamperini, USAAF: POW during World War II. Inspiration for the movie Unbroken.
- First Lieutenant John Ehrlichman, USAAF: B-17 navigator, presidential aide and figure in the Watergate scandal.
- First Lieutenant Bob Hoover, USAAF: POW and record-breaking pilot.
- First Lieutenant Raymond L. Knight, USAAF: World War II P-47 pilot.
- First Lieutenant Aleda E. Lutz, USAAF: World War II Army flight nurse.
- First Lieutenant Mary Louise Hawkins, USAAF: World War II Army evacuation flight nurse.
- First Lieutenant Donald D. Pucket, USAAF: died during Operation Tidal Wave.
- 2nd Lieutenant Dean Cullom Smith, USAACR: pilot for Admiral Byrd's 1928 to 1930 Antarctic Expedition.
- Master Sergeant Donald G. Smith, USAF: recipient of DFC.
- Chief Master Sergeant Duane D. Hackney, USAF: recipient of four DFCs.
- Technical Sergeant Ben Kuroki, USAAF: Japanese-American veteran of 58 combat missions.

=== United States Marine Corps ===
- General Earl E. Anderson, USMC: Assistant Commandant of the Marine Corps.
- General Keith B. McCutcheon, USMC
- General Christian F. Schilt, USMC: director of Marine Corps Aviation.
- Lieutenant General Frank E. Petersen, USMC: first African-American Marine Corps general.
- Lieutenant General William G. Thrash, USMC
- Major General John P. Condon, USMC
- Major General Marion Eugene Carl, USMC: first Marine Corps ace. Recipient of five DFCs.
- Major General Ross "Rusty" Rowell, USMC: 1927 Nicaragua, carried out the first coordinated dive-bombing attacks in aviation history.
- Brigadier General Joe Foss: Medal of Honor recipient, second highest scoring Marine Corps ace of World War II and Governor of South Dakota.
- Brigadier General Robert E. Galer, USMC: commanded VMF-224 on Guadalcanal.
- Colonel Kenneth L. Reusser, USMC: recipient of two DFCs. Had 253 combat missions in World War II, Korea and Vietnam.
- Colonel Archie Van Winkle, USMC: World War II, Korean War and Vietnam War veteran.
- Colonel Jefferson J. DeBlanc, USMC: shot down five planes in a single day.
- Colonel John Lucian Smith, USMC: leader of the Cactus Air Force on Guadalcanal.
- Colonel James E. Swett, USMC: shot down 5 planes on his first combat mission and recipient of eight DFCs.
- Lieutenant Colonel John F. Bolt, USMC: Only Marine jet fighter ace. Only Naval Aviator to achieve ace status in two wars (WWII and Korea.)
- Major William H. May, USMC: FAA Pioneer, recipient of seven DFCs.
- Major Robert Claude Maze, USMC
- Major Stephen W. Pless, USMC
- Captain Donald N. Aldrich, USMC: 20 kills.
- Captain Cecil A. Alexander Jr., USMCR: modern architect. Recipient of two DFCs during World War II.
- Captain Charles S. Whitehouse, USMC: diplomat, CIA officer and recipient of seven DFCs.
- Captain Hubert A. "Butch" Locke, USMC: recipient of 2 DFCs. Completed 430 combat missions during the Vietnam War.
- First Lieutenant Robert M. Hanson, USMC: member of the Black Sheep Squadron (VMFA-214) with 25 kills.

=== United States Navy ===
- Admiral Stan Arthur, USN: Vice Chief of Naval Operations and recipient of 11 DFCs.
- Admiral Thomas B. Hayward, USN: Chief of Naval Operations.
- Admiral James L. Holloway III, USN: Chief of Naval Operations.
- Admiral Thomas H. Moorer, USN: Chairman of the Joint Chiefs of Staff.
- Admiral Huntington Hardisty, USN: Commander in Chief of United States Pacific Command.
- Vice Admiral Walter E. Carter Jr., USN: president of the United States Naval War College and superintendent of the United States Naval Academy.
- Vice Admiral John T. Hayward, USN: president of the United States Naval War College.
- Vice Admiral Diego E. Hernández, USN: vice commander of NORAD.
- Vice Admiral Edward H. Martin, USN: POW for over five years.
- Vice Admiral James B. Stockdale, USN: Medal of Honor recipient, POW in Vietnam, president of the United States Naval War College and vice presidential candidate.
- Rear Admiral Richard E. Byrd, USN: Medal of Honor recipient, organized and led first flights over the north and south poles.
- Rear Admiral Jeremiah Denton, USN: Navy Cross recipient, POW in Vietnam for seven and a half years.
- Rear Admiral Wade McClusky, USN: hero of the Battle of Midway.
- Captain Michael J. Estocin, USN: Medal of Honor recipient, missing in action in the Vietnam War.
- Captain Cecil E. Harris, USN: second highest scoring Navy ace with 24 kills. Recipient of three DFCs.
- Captain David McCampbell, USN: Medal of Honor recipient, top US Navy ace of World War II.
- Captain Royce Williams, USN: ace fighter pilot during the Vietnam War, awarded two DFCs.
- Commander Everett Alvarez Jr., USN: POW in Vietnam for eight years and seven months.
- Commander Stephen Coonts, USNR: Vietnam War veteran, lawyer and author.
- Commander Eugene A. Valencia Jr., USNR: 23 aerial victories in World War II, awarded five DFCs.
- Lieutenant Commander Ira C. Kepford, USNR: 16 aerial victories in World War II.
- Lieutenant Commander Edward "Butch" O'Hare, USN: shot down 3 Japanese bombers and damaged two others on a single flight. Two DFCs.
- Lieutenant Commander George Otto Noville, USNR: flew on second non-stop trans-Atlantic flight with Richard E. Byrd.
- Lieutenant Commander Richard Halsey Best, USN : the first pilot to successfully bomb two Japanese carriers, the Akagi and the Hiryu, in one day
- Lieutenant Harold June, USN: co-pilot of first flight over the South Pole.
- Lieutenant Joseph P. Kennedy Jr., USNR: Navy Cross recipient and brother of President John F. Kennedy.
- Lieutenant Dieter Dengler, USN: Navy Cross recipient.
- Ensign Jesse L. Brown, USNR: first African-American naval aviator.

=== United States Coast Guard ===
- Radioman First Class Benjamin Bottoms, USCG: Greenland Patrol, World War II
- Vice Admiral John Currier, USCG
- Lieutenant John A. Prichard, USCG: Greenland Patrol, World War II
- Aviation Survival Technician 2nd Class Tyler Jaggers, USCG

=== United States Army ===
- General of the Army Douglas MacArthur: Medal of Honor recipient, Chief of Staff of the United States Army (1930–1935), commander of the Southwest Pacific Area (1942–1945) and commander of United Nations forces in Korea (1950–1951). DFC awarded for supervising and observing in person the Sukchon-Sunchon airborne operation north of Pyongyang.
- General Alexander Haig, USA: NATO Supreme Allied Commander for Europe and Secretary of State.
- General Wayne A. Downing, USA: commander of United States Special Operations Command.
- General John W. Foss, USA: combat veteran of Vietnam and Commander United States Army Training and Doctrine Command
- General Frederick M. Franks Jr., USA: commander of VII Corps during Operation Desert Storm.
- General John Galvin, USA: NATO Supreme Allied Commander for Europe.
- General Frederick Kroesen, USA: combat veteran of World War II, Korea and Vietnam and commander of 7th United States Army.
- General Gary E. Luck, USA: commander, United States Forces Korea.
- General Edward C. Meyer, USA: Chief of Staff of the United States Army.
- General Dennis Reimer, USA: Chief of Staff of the United States Army.
- General Roscoe Robinson Jr., USA: first African-American US Army four star general.
- General Bernard W. Rogers, USA: Chief of Staff of the United States Army and Supreme Allied Commander for NATO.
- General Norman Schwarzkopf, USA: commander of Operation Desert Storm.
- General Donn A. Starry, USA: commander of the United States Army Training and Doctrine Command.
- General Sam S. Walker, USA: son of General Walton Walker and superintendent of the Virginia Military Institute.
- General Walton Walker, USA: commander of the 8th Army in Korea and recipient of two DFCs.
- General Melvin Zais, USA: commander of the 101st Airborne Division in Vietnam.
- Lieutenant General Edward Almond, USA: commanded X Corps during the Korean War.
- Lieutenant General Hobart R. Gay, USA: commanded the 1st Cavalry Division in the Korean War.
- Lieutenant General David E. Grange, USA: combat veteran of World War II, Korea and Vietnam and commander of the Sixth United States Army.
- Lieutenant General James F. Hollingsworth, USA: combat veteran of World War II and Vietnam. Recipient of three DFCs.
- Lieutenant General Thomas Tackaberry, USA: combat veteran of Korea and Vietnam and commander of the XVIII Airborne Corps.
- Major General Patrick Henry Brady, USA: Vietnam War helicopter pilot.
- Major General George Patton IV, USA: Son of General George S. Patton.
- Colonel Bruce P. Crandall, USA: Vietnam War helicopter pilot.
- Colonel David Hackworth, USA: highly decorated Army officer, commentator and author.
- Lieutenant Colonel Bo Gritz, USA: highly decorated Special Forces officer in Vietnam.
- Lieutenant Colonel John Paul Vann, USA: military advisor in Vietnam.
- Major Lauri Törni, USA: Veteran of the Finnish Army, Waffen SS during World War II and U.S. Army Special Forces in Vietnam.
- Chief Warrant Officer Richard McCoy Jr., USA: Vietnam veteran and aircraft hijacker.
- Command Sergeant Major Silas L. Copeland, USA: Sergeant Major of the Army.

== See also ==
- Distinguished Flying Cross (United Kingdom)
- Inter-service decorations of the United States military
