= Holguin (disambiguation) =

Holguin or Holguín may refer to:

== Places ==
- Holguín, a city in Cuba
- Holguín Province in Cuba

== People ==
- Jeffrey Holguin (born 1978), an American sport shooter
- Brian Holguin, American comic book writer
- Jorge Holguín (1848–1928), a Colombian politician and military officer, and two time Acting President of Colombia
- Jose L. Holguin (1921–1994), a United States Air Force Colonel
- Juan Ignacio Larrea Holguín (1927–2006), archbishop of Guayaquil
- María Ángela Holguín (born in 1963), the Minister of Foreign Affairs of Colombia
- Pedro Álvarez Holguín (1490–1542), a Spanish nobleman, military and Conquistador of Perú

== Sports ==
- Holguín (baseball), a Cuban team
- FC Holguín, a Cuban football team
