= William Harries =

William Harries may refer to:

- William H. Harries, U.S. Representative from Minnesota
- William Matthew Harries, member of both houses of the Parliament of the Cape of Good Hope
- Will Harries, Welsh rugby union player

== See also ==
- William Harris
- William Harrison
- Bill Harris
