= Noel "Razor" Smith =

British writer and former criminal

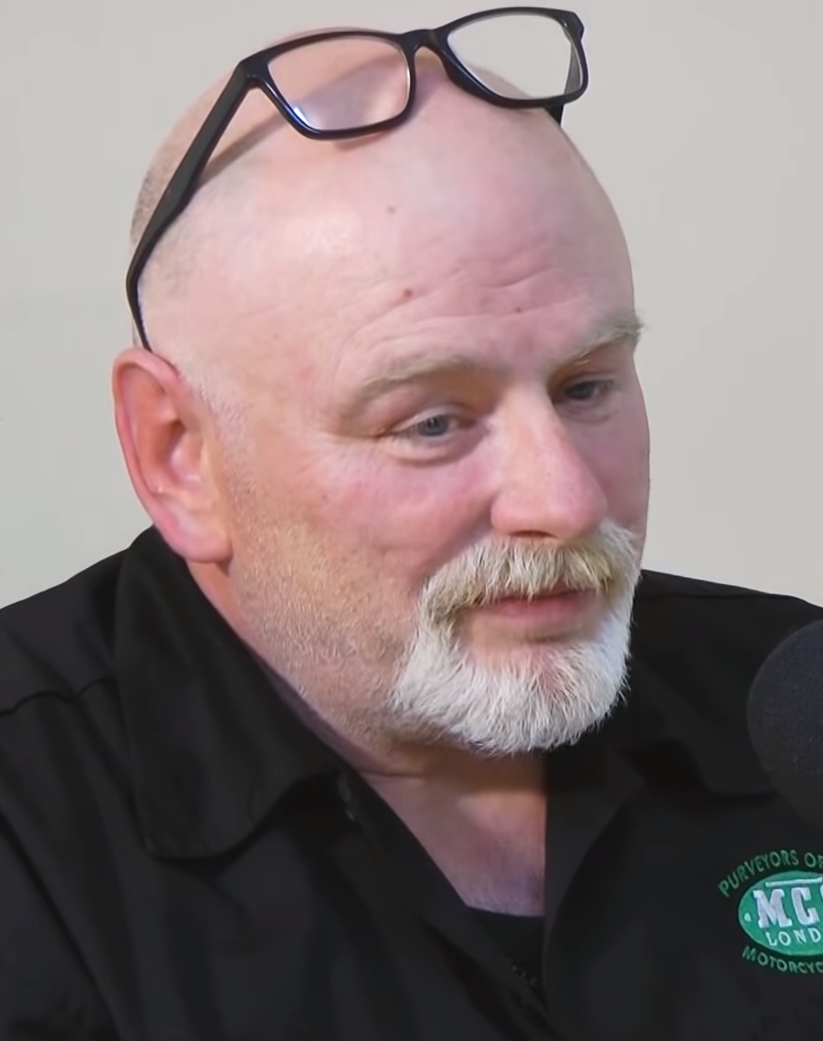
Smith in 2019

Noel "Razor" Smith (born 24 December 1960) is a British writer and former criminal. He has spent the greater part of his adult life in prison, serving a life sentence for armed robbery. In prison he taught himself to read and write, gained an Honours Diploma from the London School of Journalism and an A-level in law. He has been awarded a number of Koestler awards for his writing and has contributed articles to the Independent, the Guardian, Punch, the Big Issue, the New Statesman and the New Law Journal. His autobiography, A Few Kind Words and a Loaded Gun, was published by Penguin in 2004. He went on to write A Rusty Gun: Facing Up To a Life of Crime in 2010 after serving at the unique rehabilitation prison HMP Grendon and moving to HMP Blantyre House, prior to being released on 12 May 2010.

== Life and criminal career ==
Smith was born in London to Irish immigrant parents: an unemployed and violent father and working mother. He grew up in the Holloway Road area and in Balham. He was first arrested for stealing apples and at that time had a positive view of the police. However, while playing truant from school at the age of 14 with a friend, he was picked up by the burglary squad and beaten and tortured by them. They were then forced to confess to a series of burglaries that they had not committed. When the case came to court, he admitted to making-up the burglaries and the magistrate ordered the police to investigate, leading to the charges being dismissed and a recommendation to sue the police. This then led to harassment by the police on several occasions, for example raiding the family home to the extent where they opted to drop the charges.

In his own words, Smith "threw [himself] into crime", and this led to him being sent to a detention centre. At 16, he appeared at the Old Bailey for armed robbery and possession of firearms and sentenced to three years. He used the contacts that he made during this sentence to become a professional robber, and spent his life as a professional criminal in and out of prison.

He committed over 200 bank robberies and was given a 26-year sentence, of which he served 11 years, and spent most of it reading. He was jailed for life in 1997 on the two-strikes provisions of the Crime Sentences Act 1997, after a robbery spree.

Now reformed, he has not been in trouble with the law since his release from prison in 2010.

== Writing career ==
While in Borstal, Smith tried to escape and assaulted a night watchman but was captured and thrown into a punishment block. He was allowed one book a day, and as he was not able to read he would use this book as a football. When he explained this to a Catholic priest, the priest would bring him easy-reading books and through this he became an avid reader. He quickly began to read books that he felt were not good, and felt he could write better.

In HMP Dartmoor, he tried writing and entered a short story competition and came second. Writing gave him the education to make written complaints, which he found to be more successful than violence. While on release in 1997 he met author Will Self at a dinner party. In 1999, he sent Self a short story that he had written, and was told that nothing would happen until he decided to change his criminal ways. Smith was further encouraged to change his ways after his son Joe died, and following this applied to HMP Grendon. This led to him writing A Rusty Gun.
