= London School of Journalism =

Journalism school in London, England

- Type: Journalism school
- Established: 1920
- Location: London, United Kingdom; 51.5272°N 0.1950°W
- Nickname: LSJ
- Website: www.lsj.org

The London School of Journalism (LSJ) is an independent journalism school based in London, England, which offers qualifications in journalism, freelance journalism and creative writing. The LSJ provides both on-site and distance learning to its students, ranging from short courses to postgraduate diplomas. The school was founded in 1920 by Sir Max Pemberton.

== Notable alumni ==
- Josie d'Arby, actress and television presenter
- Don Charlwood, Australian writer
- Gina Din, businesswoman
- Can Dundar, journalist, columnist and documentarian
- Charles Graves, journalist and author
- William Harris, journalist
- Georgios Karatzaferis, Greek politician and member of the Hellenic Parliament
- Neil Nunes, BBC Radio 4 announcer
- Noel 'Razor' Smith, career criminal and writer
- Rajesh Talwar, Indian author
- Jill Townsend, American actress, journalist (Daily Mail)
- Larissa Vassilian, journalist
- Ras Mubarak, Ghanaian journalist and politician
- Oral Ofori, journalist, digital storyteller
- Michael Ernest Sweet, educator, writer
- Varghese Paul, Indian journalist, writer
- Atiquzzaman Khan, Bangladeshi educationist, journalist
