= Mary Louise Hawkins =

Air evacuation flight nurse in WWII

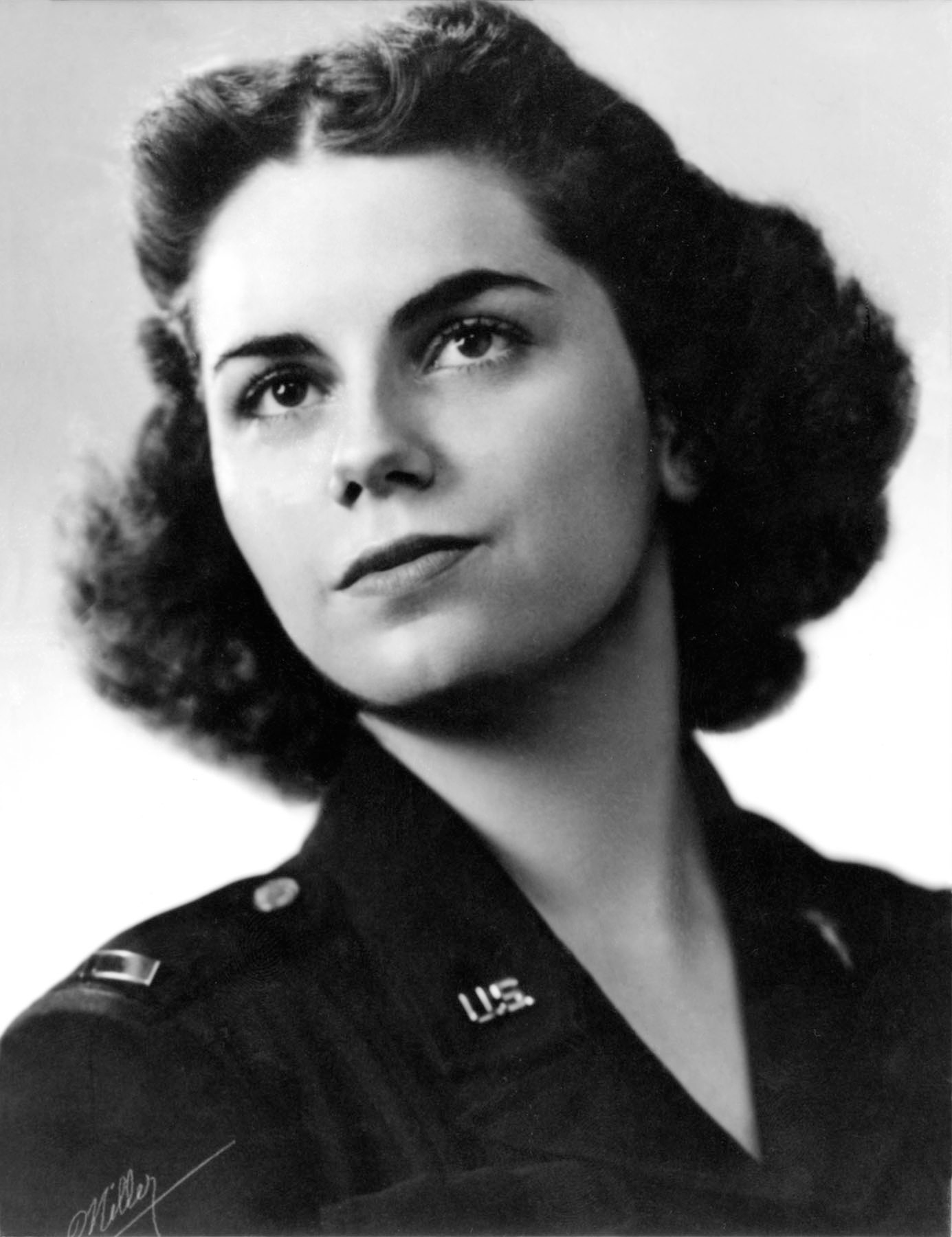
1st Lt. Mary L. Hawkins

Mary Louise Hawkins (24 May 1921 – 9 July 2007) was an Air Evacuation Flight Nurse who earned the Distinguished Flying Cross during WWII. She was born in Denver, Colorado. On 24 September 1944, 1st Lt. Mary Louise Hawkins was evacuating 24 patients from fighting at Palau to Guadalcanal when the C-47 she was aboard ran low on fuel and was forced to crash land on Bellona Island. During the landing, a propeller tore through the fuselage and severed the trachea of a patient. Hawkins made a suction tube from several items including the inflation tube from a "Mae West” life jacket and kept the man's throat clear of blood until help arrived 19 hours later. All her patients survived. For her actions, Hawkins received the Distinguished Flying Cross.

After World War II, she received her master's degree from the University of California, Berkeley, in 1953 and continued working as a nurse. She met William Michael Lambert in Saudi Arabia in 1959, and they married in Switzerland in 1960. The Lamberts returned to the US in 1976 and eventually settled in Waynesboro, Virginia in 1988. She died on 9 July 2007.
