= Gina Din =

Kenyan businesswoman (born 1961)

Gina Din-Kariūki
- Born: Gina Din; 23 October 1961 (age 65); Nanyuki
- Citizenship: Kenyan, UK
- Education: London School of Journalism
- Occupations: Founder, Gina Din Corporate Communications (1997-Present); Chairperson, Gina Din Foundation
- Spouse: Chris Kariūki
- Children: Natalya Din-Kariūki, Naythan Din-Kariūki
- Website: ginadin.com

Gina Din-Kariūki (born Gina Din, on October 23, 1961) is a Kenyan businesswoman specializing in strategic communication and public relations in Kenya. She is best known as the founder and executive chair of Gina Din Corporate Communications, which she started after leaving her job as a communications manager at Barclays Bank of Kenya in 1997.

== Early life and education ==
Born Gina Din on October 23, 1961 in Nanyuki, Kenya, she is the third daughter to hoteliers Shamsu and Malek Din. Gina Din credits learning the importance of relationships at a tender age to her parents, who owned Sportsman Arms Hotel in Nanyuki. She attributes her value of every client as a virtue she was taught by her parents, and that she emulates the same at Gina Din Corporate Communications.

Her first job was when she was 15 years old, managing a disco night at the hotel twice a week in which she'd charge an entrance fee. She'd use this as her pocket money.

Her father died when she was 18.

In 1985, Gina Din graduated with a degree in journalism from London School of Journalism. This was followed by a job as communications manager at Barclays Bank Kenya in the same year, where she worked for 14 years.

== Gina Din Corporate Communications ==
On October 1, 1997, she founded Gina Din Corporate Communications, with Barclays Bank as her first client. This was after leaving her previous job at the bank "I started my business with a lot of faith and prayer. It has been like a natural progression for me. Barclays Bank was my first account and I thank God because they helped me pay my initial bills." remarks Gina Din.

Other corporate clients included Old Mutual, Association of Kenyan Insurers, CIC Insurance, Kenya Commercial Bank, Safaricom, Kenya Red Cross & Kenya Airways.

In 2007, Gina Din Corporate Communications handled the public relations crisis work on the 2007 Kenya Airways plane crash in Duala, Cameroon. Gina acknowledged her firm's work in the aftermath of the crash terming the work as one of the best they had done in terms of handling crises.

In May 2009, in recognition of helping Korean electronics giant LG achieve its 2008 marketing targets and brand building campaign in the East African region. The company beat 14 other contestants to win the Marketing and Public Relations (MPR) gold award at an event held in Amman, Jordan.

On March 16, 2012, telecommunications firm Safaricom ended its 13-year relationship with Gina Din Corporate Communications. The contract officially ended on April 30, 2012. On December the same year, the firm won the PR Event of the Year award during the Public Relation Society of Kenya awards ceremony held at Safari Park hotel, in Nairobi, Kenya.

On August 6, 2013, it was announced that her firm had partnered with Weber Shandwick, one of the world’s leading global public relations firms, in a deal that would see both the agencies grow their footprints in Africa. On November 23, Gina Din Group was feted as the best PR firm in Kenya during the 2013 Public Relation Society of Kenya annual awards held in Nairobi.

== Charitable works ==
On August 18, 2008, Din-Kariūki was named the Goodwill Ambassador to the Kenya Red Cross.

In 2011, as part of the Red Cross, launched the Kenyans for Kenya initiative to combat the worst drought affecting Kenya in 60 years.

On March 22, 2016, the United Nations Population Fund, designated Gina Din-Kariūki as Honorary Ambassador, supporting the Fund’s efforts to empower women and adolescent girls, with a focus on advancing their health and rights.

== Personal life ==
Gina is married to Chris Kariūki with whom she has two children: a daughter Natalya and son Naythan. Her daughter, Dr. Natalya Din-Kariuki, is assistant professor in the Department of English and Comparative Literary Studies at the University of Warwick focusing on early modern literature. Her son Naythan Din-Kariuki is a first team recruitment analyst at Aston Villa Football club in the UK.

== Awards ==
In 2011, as part of the Gina Din group, she received accolades for championing the Kenyans for Kenya campaign in response to the famine and deaths in Turkana. The campaign raised more than 700 million Kenya Shillings.

In 2013, Gina Din-Kariūki was named New Africa Magazine's 100 most influential Africans.

In 2015, Gina Din-Kariūki was named East Africa Business Woman of the Year for which she received the CNBC Africa All Africa Business Leaders Awards (AABLA).

== See also ==
- Amina Mohammed
