= Oral Ofori =

Ghanaian-American digital storyteller

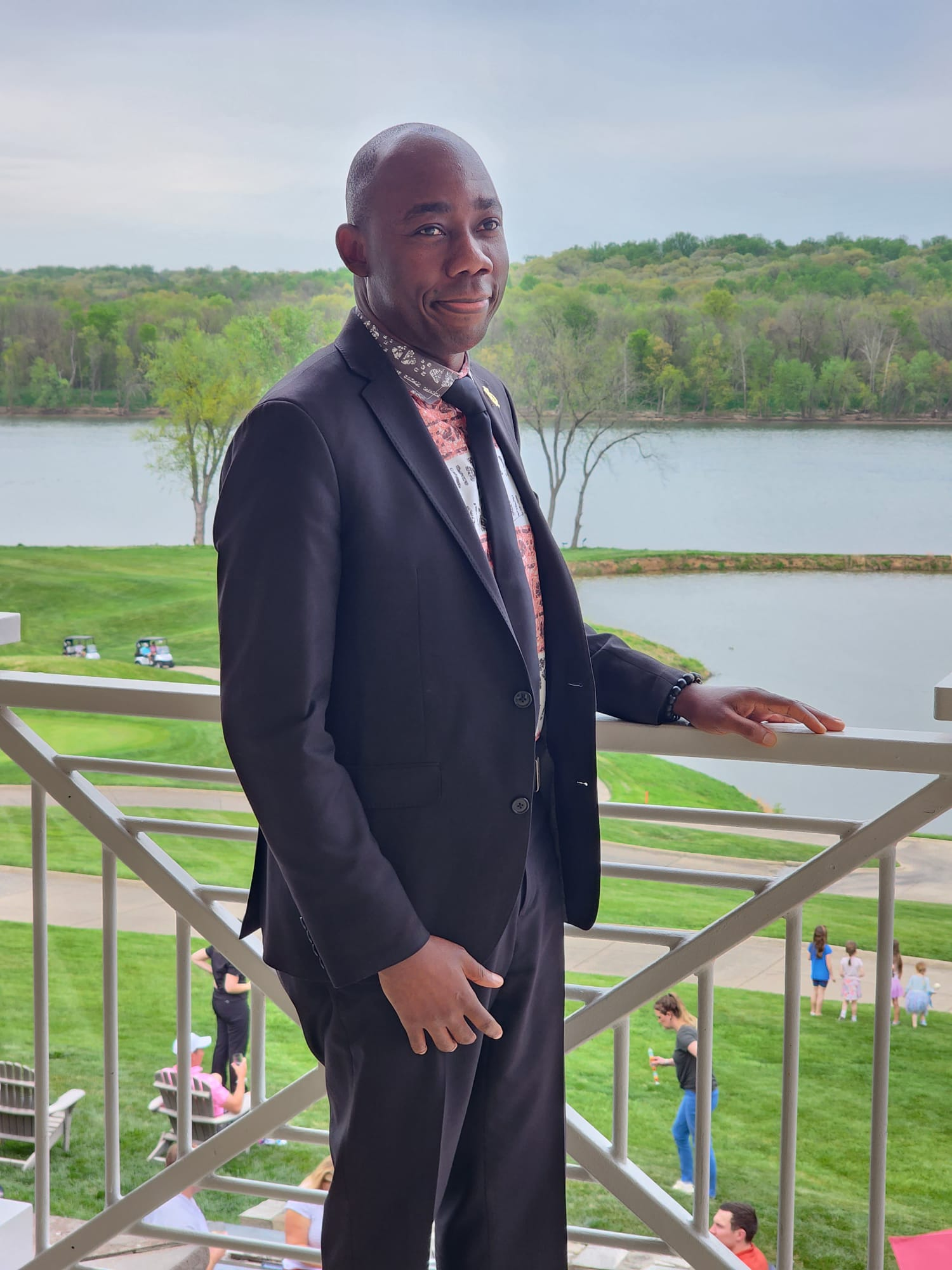
- Born: January 26, 1980; Tema, Ghana
- Occupation: Digital media producer
- Years active: 2006 – present
- Known for: Founding TheAfricanDream and Coordinating Seminar on Ghana's RTI bill in US
- Spouse: Alda Lee Viglione
- Website: www.oralofori.com

Oral Kwame Ofori (born January 26, 1980), professionally known as Oral Ofori, is a Ghanaian-American award-winning digital media producer and blogger, freelance journalist, entrepreneur, and writer. Born in Tema, he is also the founder of the US-based communication consultancy TheAfricanDream LLC. In February 2018 Ofori took on a language interpretation job as a level II interpreter of the Twi and Ga language with the Fairfax County Public Schools system and almost 4 years afterwards in December 2021 he started work with the Embassy of Ghana, Washington, D.C. as Head of the Customer Relations Office under Ambassador Alima Mahama. Mr Ofori's firm TheAfricanDream LLC partnered the Washington DC government in the United States in February 2024 to provide media for the event dubbed Africa on the Avenue to support local businesses.

== Early life, career and education ==
Born to Ghanaian parents in Tema, Oral Ofori graduated from Chemu Senior High School in 1998 and completed his journalism studies at the London School of Journalism in 2006. The following year, he began an internship with the Voice of America (VOA) in Washington, D.C., as a radio news reporter and contributor.

Ofori is also a columnist for Ghanaian news websites such as GhanaWeb, ModernGhana, and the US-based Afrikan Post newspaper. He has also contributed to publications including the Los Angeles Sentinel, Swedish news magazine Beyond Borders, the Dallas Weekly, the North Dallas Gazette, and the Baltimore Times.

Since 2014, Ofori has been host and producer of #TheAfricanDream show aired on Fairfax, Virginia Public-access television's channel 30.

In December 2025, he was invited by the Republic of Togo's Ministry of Foreign Affairs for the 9th Pan-African Congress speaking on the topic using Strategic Diplomacy & Communication as tools for Positioning Africa as a Leading Actor in its Own Narrative. The event was under the auspices of the African Union.

== Reporting and interviews ==
Ofori formally started a blog in 2011 and has since then written about or interviewed persons including Mayor Peter Bossman, scientist and fiber optics innovator Dr. Thomas Mensah, Anthony K. Wutoh; Howard University Provost and Chief Academic Officer, and musician and artist Koby Maxwell.

Some of his other interview subjects have been Deborah Addo of INOVA Hospitals in the US, Grammy-nominated musician and activist Rocky Dawuni, sportscaster Sonny Young of Voice Of America, historic Quander family member Rohulamin Quander, Hege Hertzberg, former Ambassador of Norway to Ghana, Gambia, Mali, Burkina Faso and Liberia, and among others Howard University Professor Michael C. Campbell.

== Recognitions ==
Year	Recognition	Body
2026	Lecturer at 2026 Virginia and America's 250th Anniversary	Fredericksburg sister-cities of Virginia, USA
2025	Global Peace Advocate	HWPL Organization, Washington DC
2023	Honored for Promoting the African Story globally	Ghanaian Professionals Network, Texas
2023	2022 Winner, Best Diaspora Blog	Afrobloggers, Diaspora
2020	2020 Top Ten D.C. Media & Film Awardee	Ayoo Africa, Washington DC
2018	Over 50 episodes produced of #TheAfricanDream TV show	Fairfax Public Access, Virginia
2013	Diversity Empowerment Awardee	ACM New England, US
