= USCGC Guthrie =

Ship of the U.S. Revenue Cutter Service

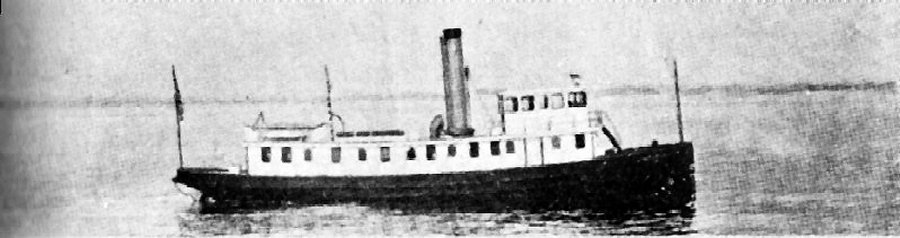
- USRC Guthrie in 1914

History

United States
- Name: Guthrie
- Namesake: James Guthrie
- Fate: Scrapped 1942

General characteristics
- Displacement: 149 tons
- Propulsion: Triple expansion steam engine
- Speed: 10 knots (19 km/h)

USRC Guthrie was a small patrol vessel, built for the United States Revenue Cutter Service in 1895. She was named after James Guthrie, 21st Secretary of the Treasury. She was the third ship of that name, the first two being launched in 1868 and 1882.

The vessel was temporarily transferred from the United States Treasury to the United States Navy, for wartime service, during the Spanish American War, World War I and World War II. She was permanently transferred to the newly created United States Coast Guard, when it was formed from the Revenue Cutter Service, the United States Lighthouse Service and the United States Lifeboat Service.

Benjamin Bottoms served as a radio operator aboard her, early in World War II.

She was scrapped in 1942.

== Specifications ==
Guthrie was a steel-hulled vessel powered a triple expansion steam engine. She was only capable of 10 knots (19 km/h). She displaced 149 tons, and had a crew of 10.

== Operational history ==
During the Spanish–American War she was assigned to patrol Baltimore. On 23 January 1902 she was involved in a minor collision with Emma A. Ford (United States) in Baltimore Harbor, doing $10 in damage to Ford and $150 to the Guthrie. On May 30, 1903 she was involved in a minor collision with the steamship Queen Anne in the area of Baltimore, suffering only $80 in damage. During World War I she was assigned to patrol Philadelphia. During World War II she patrolled Portland, Maine.

== See also ==
- USRC James Guthrie (1868)
