= Neil Nunes =

British-Jamaican continuity announcer (born 1980)

- Born: December 12, 1980 (age 45); Kingston, Jamaica
- Education: Northern Caribbean University
- Alma mater: London School of Journalism
- Occupations: Continuity announcer and newsreader
- Employer(s): BBC Radio 4; BBC World Service

Neil Nunes (born 12 December 1980) (pronounced /nuːnɛz/ ) is a British-Jamaican continuity announcer and newsreader on BBC Radio 4 in the United Kingdom, and on the BBC World Service.

== Early life ==
Nunes was born in Kingston, Jamaica, and brought up in the parish of Manchester in the west-central part of the island.

== Career ==
While studying for a degree in biology at Northern Caribbean University, Nunes became involved with the university radio station as a presenter. He went on to work as a newsreader and reporter for radio networks in the Dutch Caribbean, while at the same time serving as a correspondent for the BBC Caribbean Service. He studied as a postgraduate at the London School of Journalism.

He began working as a freelance announcer on BBC Radio 4 in 2006. Initially, he suffered criticism from some listeners for his Caribbean accent, but was robustly defended by others on the programme Feedback. He is now a well-established announcer, and since November 2017 also reads the news.

Nunes joined the BBC World Service as a producer and presenter of current affairs programmes. He also reads world news bulletins on the World Service in addition to his Radio 4 continuity work. He also features as "Narrator" on Twirlywoos. His style of delivery and consistently misplaced emphases are parodied by Jon Culshaw on Dead Ringers.
