= John A. Pritchard =

United States Coast Guardsman (1914–1942)

John A. Pritchard Jr.
- Born: January 12, 1914; Redfield, South Dakota, U.S.
- Died: November 28, 1942 (aged 28); Greenland
- Military career
- Allegiance: United States
- Branch: United States Coast Guard
- Service years: 1934–1942
- Rank: Lieutenant
- Unit: USCGC Northland
- Known for: died during a rescue attempt
- Conflicts: World War II
- Awards: Distinguished Flying Cross (posthumous)

John A. Pritchard Jr. (January 12, 1914 – November 28, 1942) was a United States Coast Guardsman who died while attempting to rescue the crew of a USAAF bomber that had crashed-landed in Greenland in November 1942. Pritchard was the pilot of the USCGC Northland's Grumman J2F-4 Duck floatplane. When a B-17 bomber crash landed near Northland. Pritchard and his radioman, RM1 Benjamin A. Bottoms, volunteered to search for it. He sighted the bomber, and landed as close to the wreck as possible. Pritchard and Bottoms were able to assist two of the injured bomber crew to their plane, and take them back to Northland. However, on their second rescue visit they encountered bad weather, and crashed. Their bodies have never been found.

== Early life ==
Pritchard was born in Redfield, South Dakota in 1914, and graduated from Beverly Hills High School in 1931. He enlisted in the United States Navy on March 1, 1932. He attended the Naval Academy Preparatory School until accepting an appointment to the United States Coast Guard Academy on August 20, 1934.

== Coast Guard career ==
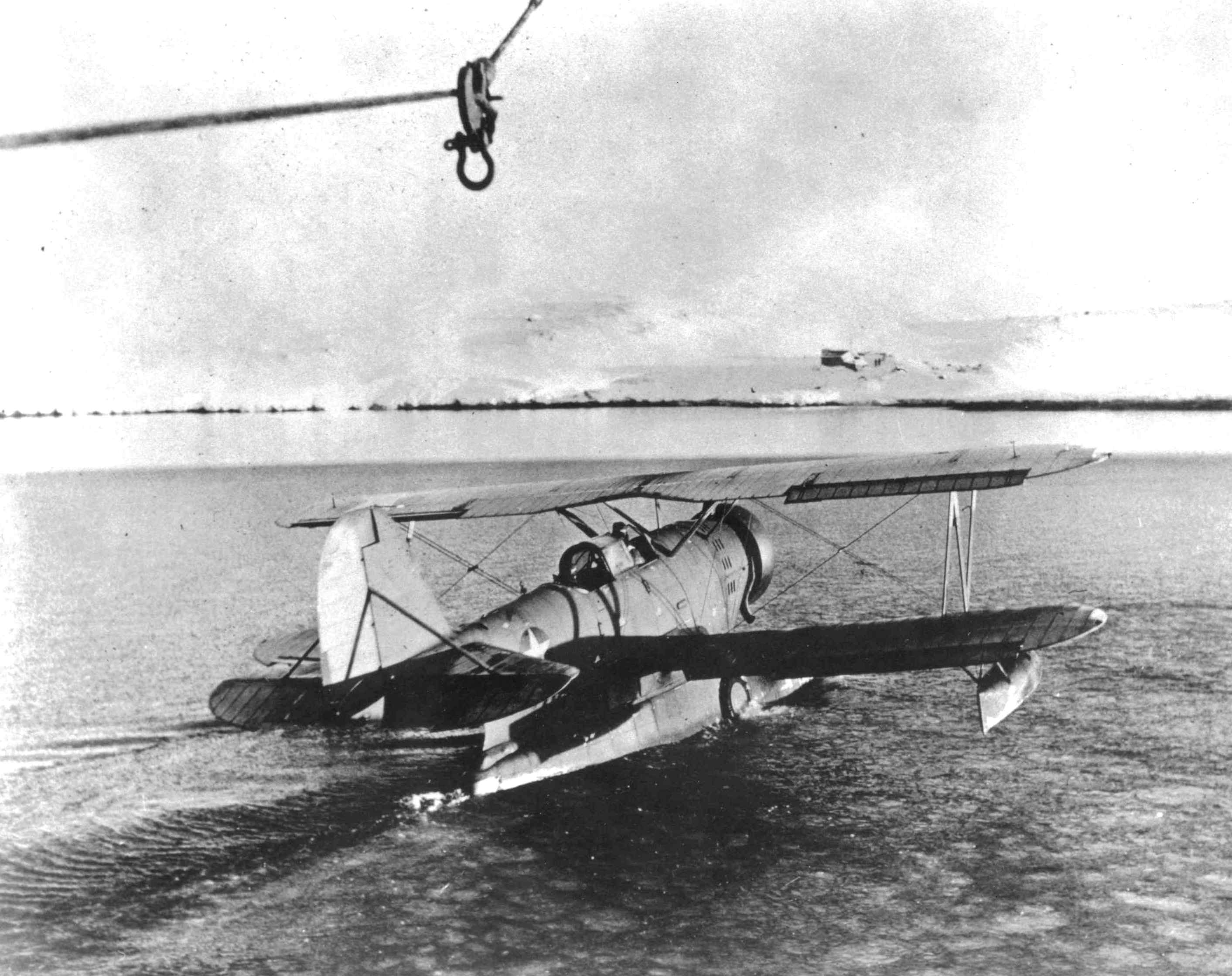
Prichard was the pilot of this small floatplane, a Grumman J2F-4 Duck.

Pritchard graduated from the Coast Guard Academy on June 2, 1938, and his first assignment as a new ensign was on board USCGC Haida with the Bering Sea Patrol. In August, 1940 Pritchard entered flight training at the Naval Air Training Center, Pensacola, Florida. He graduated from flight training on February 15, 1941, becoming Coast Guard Aviator No. 82 before reporting to Coast Guard Air Station Miami. On June 2, 1941, he was promoted to lieutenant (junior grade). Pritchard was temporarily assigned to the aviation officer's billet on board USCGC Northland with the Greenland Patrol in February 1942 before returning to Miami for a short period. He then returned to Northland for aviation patrol duties and was promoted to lieutenant June 15, 1942.

On November 23, Pritchard led a rescue party from Northland to a glacier where a aircrew from the Royal Canadian Air Force had been stranded for thirteen days. The aircrew and the rescue party returned to Northland safely and Pritchard was awarded the Navy and Marine Corps Medal posthumously for his leadership in the rescue. On November 28, the Northland's radioman picked up faint signals from a USAAF B-17 bomber that had crashed on the Greenland ice cap. Pritchard and his radioman, RM1 Bottoms, volunteered to try a rescue attempt by landing on the ice; a feat that had never been successful before. Pritchard and Bottoms landed on the ice about two miles from the bomber.

While Bottoms contacted the bomber by radio, Pritchard hiked across the ice cap to the bomber and helped two of the injured crew back to the aircraft. Pritchard told the bomber crew that the J2F-4 Duck could only carry two additional persons and that he would return the next day to pick up additional crew. After returning the injured to Northland safely, the two Coast Guardsmen took off on November 29 to attempt another landing near the bomber. After returning to the crash site, Pritchard made a successful landing on the ice and picked up another injured crew member and took off headed for Northland. Weather closed in after the take off and Bottom's radio signals to Northland became weaker and finally stopped. The wreckage of the J2F-4 Duck was spotted later but rescue crews could get no closer than six miles from the Duck's crash site. Pritchard was declared missing in action on November 29, 1942 and declared dead on November 30, 1943. Both Pritchard and Bottoms were awarded the Distinguished Flying Cross posthumously for their efforts to rescue the downed B-17 bomber crew.
