= William Harris (footballer) =

Scottish footballer

Personal information
- Full name: William Harris
- Date of birth: 25 September 1890
- Place of birth: Glasgow, Scotland
- Position: Full back

Senior career*
Years	Team	Apps	(Gls)
	Benburb	?	(?)
	Rutherglen Glencairn F.C.	?	(?)
1909	Tottenham Hotspur	7	(0)
- * Club domestic league appearances and goals

William Harris (25 September 1890–?) was a Scottish professional footballer who played for Benburb, Rutherglen Glencairn and Tottenham Hotspur.

== Football career ==
Harris signed for Tottenham Hotspur in May, 1909 for a fee of five guineas from the Govan based Scottish junior club Benurb. The full back made his league debut in November, 1909 when they visited St James' Park to play Newcastle United, the match which ended in 1–0 to the home side with the only goal scored by Scott Duncan. Harris had been expected to join his local club Third Lanark but opted to join the North London club. The full back was said to have been able to play equally as well on either side of defence.

=== Appearances for Tottenham Hotspur 1909-10 ===
First Team – 12 appearances in total. Football League Division One 7, Others 5

- 11 October Croydon Common home won 7-1 London FA Challenge Cup Rd 2;
- 1 November Woolwich Arsenal home won 3-0 London Professional Football Charity Fund;
- 6 November Newcastle United away lost 0-1 Div 1;
- 8 November Queens Park Rangers at Stamford Bridge drew 0-0 London FA Challenge Cup semi final;
- 13 November Liverpool home won 1-0 Div 1;
- 15 November Queens Park Rangers at Craven Cottage won 4-1 London FA Challenge Cup semi final replay;
- 20 November Aston Villa away lost 2-3 Div 1;
- 22 November Preston North End away lost 1-4 Div 1;
- 27 November Sheffield United home won 2-1 Div 1;
- 4 December Woolwich Arsenal away lost 0-1 Div 1;
- 6 December Fulham at Stamford Bridge lost 1-4 London FA Challenge Cup Final;
- 11 December Bolton Wanderers home drew 1-1 Div 1
