= USCGC Harriet Lane =

USCGC Harriet Lane refers to three ships of the United States Coast Guard:

- USRC Harriet Lane (1857), a revenue cutter serving in the United States Revenue Cutter Service 1861–1881
- USCGC Harriet Lane (WSC-141), a 125-foot cutter in service with the Coast Guard 1926–1946
- USCGC Harriet Lane (WMEC-903), a medium-endurance cutter active in service with the Coast Guard, commissioned 1984
