= Georgy Parshin =

Il-2 pilot in the Soviet Air Forces

Georgy Mikhailovich Parshin
- Георгий Михайлович Паршин
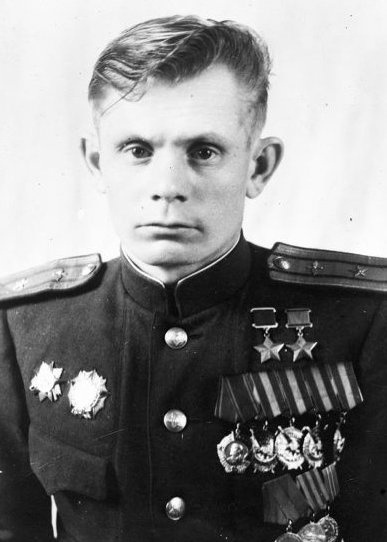
- Born: 23 May [O.S. 10 May] 1916; Setukha, Tula Governorate, Russian Empire
- Died: 13 March 1956 (aged 39); Moscow oblast, USSR
- Military career
- Allegiance: Soviet Union
- Branch: Soviet Air Force
- Service years: 1941 – 1946
- Rank: Major
- Unit: 943rd Attack Aviation Regiment
- Conflicts: World War II
- Awards: Hero of the Soviet Union (twice)

Georgy Mikhailovich Parshin (Russian: Гео́ргий Миха́йлович Па́ршин; 23 May [O.S. 10 May] 1916 – 13 March 1956) was an Il-2 pilot in the Soviet Air Forces during the Second World War who was twice awarded the title Hero of the Soviet Union. He went on to become a test pilot after the war, but was killed in a plane crash ten years later.

== Early life ==
Parshin was born on 23 May [O.S. 10 May] 1916 to a Russian peasant family in Setukha village in the Tula Governorate of the Russian Empire. Two years after moving to Dnepropetrovsk in 1932 he graduated from his ninth grade of school, after which he worked as a metalworker. Having graduated from the Dnepropetrovsk aeroclub in 1936, he went on to attend training for flight instructors which he completed in 1937. He then worked at the aeroclub until 1938, moving on to attend parachuting school in Tushino, which he graduated from in 1939, after which he worked as a parachuting instructor at aeroclubs in Chuvashia, Bryansk, and Grozny. He briefly served as a flight instructor at the Sverdlovsk aeroclub of Moscow starting in April 1941, but left the post in June due to the German invasion of the Soviet Union.

== World War II ==
Having joined the military in June 1941, Parshin initially served as a pilot in a fighter aviation regiment until transferring Chuvashia to work as an instructor at a flight school in August. In January 1942 he briefly served as a flight instructor for the 28th Reserve Aviation Regiment, where he taught pilots to fly the UT-2 and R-5, but later that month he transferred to the 65th Assault Aviation Regiment, which was renamed to the 765th Assault Aviation Regiment before it was deployed in February. Parshin quickly rose up through the ranks in the regiment, having started out as an ordinary pilot but being promoted to the position of flight commander and later deputy squadron commander in barely a year. During a sortie in September 1942 he was wounded in the leg, but after recovering he returned to flying and remained with the regiment until April 1943 when he left to attend officer training in Samara, which he completed in July 1943. Upon returning to the warfront in August, Parshin became a squadron commander in the 943rd Assault Aviation Regiment. The unit saw heavy combat in the battle to save blockaded Leningrad, resulting in him once flying five sorties in one day during the first wave of the offensive. Parshin frequently flew alongside his friend Andrey Kizim, who saved his life, shielding him from anti-aircraft fire and shooting down an enemy fighter attacking their squadron on 3 March 1944; just two days earlier, Parshin had been nominated for the title Hero of the Soviet Union for having flown 106 sorties. As a result of the intense aerial battle that took place that day, Parshin and his gunner were forced to make an emergency landing and bail out of their stricken plane after being shot down by enemy aircraft, leaving Parshin seriously wounded; during the aerial battle Kizim shot down a fighter attacking their squadron, but Parshin's plane was too damaged from the attack to continue on. The two were rescued by Soviet scouts in the forest who helped them return to their regiment. When he returned he was given a brand new Il-2, with "For Leningrad" painted on the side. During his first sortie on the plane he managed to shoot down an Fw 190, and he went on to fly dozens more sorties on it. Before receiving the title in August he continued to tally up sorties, and in July he began flying with Ivan Skripnikov as gunner. Later on 23 October 1944 he participated in a highly successful mission to attack a group of enemy tanks; despite being targeted with a barrage of anti-aircraft fire, he and his subordinates were able to strike his target, taking out four enemy tanks without suffering any losses. During the early phase of the East Prussian offensive Parshin flew 12 sorties in the span of five days, sometimes as many as four in a day, and on 17 February 1945 he was nominated for a second gold star for having flown 202 sorties. By then he had been promoted to the position of regimental navigator, and before the title was awarded in April he was made commander of the regiment. Despite his senior position, he continued to fly in combat, and by the end of the war he totaled 253 missions on the Il-2.

== Postwar ==
Parshin remained in command of his regiment until April 1946, but in May he left the military. Initially he flew Li-2 and Il-12 cargo transporters, but he went on to become a test pilot, graduating from training in 1949. From then until 1951 he worked as a test pilot at a Moscow aircraft factory, where he conducted test flights on Il-12 and Il-28. Tragically, an emergency bailout from an Il-28 on 26 August 1951 resulted in the death of his navigator and flight engineer and left him badly wounded. As a result of his injuries, he was only allowed to fly dual control aircraft, so he became a test pilot at the Scientific Testing Institute of Aircraft Equipment of Zhukovsky in 1952. However, he died in a crash on 13 March 1956; he was piloting an Il-28 to film the mid-air refueling of a MiG-19 by a Tu-16, when his Il-28 went into an uncontrollable roll at an altitude of 3,000 metres (9,800 ft) before crashing, killing Parshin as well as the cameraman and radio operator. The cause of the roll remains unclear. He was buried in the Vagankovsky cemetery.

== Awards and honors ==
- Twice Hero of the Soviet Union (19 August 1944 and 19 April 1945)
- Order of Lenin (19 August 1944)
- Four Order of the Red Banner (5 April 1943, 27 January 1944, 11 July 1944, and 24 January 1945)
- Order of Suvorov 3rd class (23 April 1945)
- Order of Alexander Nevsky (5 November 1944)
- Order of the Patriotic War 1st class (15 February 1943)
- campaign medals
