= William Stewart Harris =

William Stewart Harris (13 December 1922 – 6 December 1994) was a senior research fellow in anthropology in the Research School of Pacific Studies at the Australian National University. He was known as a journalist and Aboriginal rights advocate who also published on a range of other subjects, including Palestinian self-determination and the defence of the Builders' Labourers' Federation who had come under attack for its militant industrial actions and its campaigns on environmental and social issues. He was an outspoken opponent of Apartheid and was arrested and charged with hindering police during demonstrations against the 1971 Springbok South African rugby union tour of Australia.

== Early life ==
William Stewart Harris was born on 13 December 1922 at Woking, Surrey, England. His parents were Henry Harris, retired banker, and his Victorian-born wife Katie (née Hay). He was educated at Marlborough College and then Clare College, Cambridge (BA, 1944; MA, 1948).

After service with the Royal Naval Volunteer Reserve during World War II he undertook study at the London School of Journalism.

== Personal life ==
On 8 October 1955 Harris married Burmese-born Mary Orr Deas, daughter of a Scottish company director, at St Paul's Church of England, Knightsbridge. The couple had four children: Nick, Karina, Alastair and Iona.

== Later life ==
Harris died of bacterial meningitis on 6 December 1994 in Woden Valley Hospital, Canberra.
