= Bill Harris (aviator) =

- Born: June 15, 1916; Strathmore, California
- Died: May 23, 2012 (aged 95); Klamath Falls, Oregon
- Military career
- Allegiance: United States
- Branch: United States Army Air Forces
- Service years: 1936–1948
- Rank: Lieutenant Colonel
- Unit: 339th Fighter Squadron
- Commands: 18th Fighter Group August 1, 1945
- Conflicts: World War II: South West Pacific Theatre
- Awards: Distinguished Flying Cross with 4 Oak Leaf Clusters, the Bronze Star Medal and the Air Medal with 23 Oak Leaf Clusters.[4]
- Memorials: In 2015, Harris was inducted into the Hall of Honor at the Evergreen Aviation & Space Museum.[4] The Klamath Falls Chapter of the Air Force Association was named the Bill Harris Chapter in his honor.[4]

Bill Harris (June 15, 1916 – May 23, 2012) was a United States Army Air Force fighter ace who was credited with shooting down 16 aircraft during World War II.

== Life ==
Bill Harris was born on June 15, 1916, in Strathmore, California, to Albert Asbury Harris and Harriet Barclay Harris.

He enlisted in the United States Navy in 1936 and served aboard the USS Houston (CA-30). Due to his height, Harris was selected to fly in the back seat of a Curtiss SOC Seagull as a rear gunner and radio operator. In 1940, he was honorably discharged from the Navy.

Harris went on to run Harris Bros. Lumber Co. with his brother Mal and former shipmate Bron Barrett in Springville, California. Upon the United States entering World War II, Harris and Barrett enlisted as pilots in the United States Army Air Corps. Harris graduated from pilot training in California in October 1942 and went on to participate in the Battle of Guadalcanal where he piloted a Lockheed P-38 Lightning in the 339th Fighter Squadron. He soon racked up 16 confirmed kills. At the war's end, Harris was the rank of Lieutenant colonel and commander of the 18th Fighter Group. He was awarded the Distinguished Flying Cross with 4 Oak Leaf Clusters, the Bronze Star Medal and the Air Medal with 23 Oak Leaf Clusters. Harris left the military after the war and in 1976 he moved to Oregon where he lived out the rest of his life.

In 1995, a book was written about Harris's life titled Bill: A Pilot's Story by Brooklyn Harris.

== Death and legacy ==
Harris died on May 23, 2012, in Klamath Falls, Oregon. He was 95. In 2015, Harris was inducted into the Hall of Honor at the Evergreen Aviation & Space Museum. The Klamath Falls Chapter of the Air Force Association was named the Bill Harris Chapter in his honor.

== See also ==
- P-38 Lightning
- Guadalcanal
