= Bill Harris (geneticist) =

Scottish scientist who specialized in antibody research

Professor Bill Harris (17 November 1944 – 2 June 2014) was a genetic scientist who specialised in antibody research. An author of about 70 scientific research papers, author, editor, and contributor to many books, and 15 patent applications, Bill was most notable for his work translating science from the lab in to industry. His recent academic research centred on engineering of antibodies for application in health care, management of environmental pollution, and the derivation and use of novel combinatorial libraries. In early 2015, Bill was celebrated as a pioneering bio-entrepreneur by the University of Aberdeen during a two-day symposium at the Institute of Medical sciences.

Bill lived in Carnoustie, Scotland, known as one of the most challenging golf course in the world where the Open Championship was held in 1999 and 2007. He played this golf course every week and was formerly a committee member of The Carnoustie Golf Club, established 1842. In 2013, he published the book 'Sons of Carnoustie', which followed from his research into former golfers of Carnoustie who are thought to have spread golf around the world, known as the 'Sons of Carnoustie'. His research identified 163 such golfers from Carnoustie and his book tells of their lives and experiences. He also published a book of poetry in 2005, "thoughts and memories".

== Background ==
Bill studied biochemistry at the University of St Andrews, Scotland and then obtained his PhD at the University of Dundee in 1969. His first publication, 'The origin of life - A master molecule' was winner of the Endeavour Prize in 1968. At the time, it was not yet understood what were the 'minimal requirements' of the living cell and in this review, possible mechanisms for the origin of the primeval cell were discussed.

Between 1969 and 1978 Bill was a lecturer in biochemistry in Aberdeen University and then entered industry as Head of In Vitro Toxicology, Inveresk Research International (IRI Ltd.) 1978–80. He established and was Head of Biotechnology at IRI, 1980–86, was Research Director of Bioscot Ltd. 1986-87 and then became Professor of Genetics in Aberdeen University in 1987 where he remained until taking early retirement in 2003.

Between 1980 and 1987 he also served as Technical Director of Investments in Biotechnology by Cogent Ltd, the Technology Transfer Investment Arm of Legal & General/Commercial Union Assurance companies. He was co-founder of one of the first and world leading antibody engineering companies, Scotgen Ltd., in 1987, its Managing Director 1987–92, and President and Chief Scientific Officer of Scotgen Biopharmaceutical Inc. until he resigned in 1994.

== Research ==
Bill's research focused in health care and environmental management and the work involved tackling problems focusing on protein engineering. Combinatorial libraries were designed and used to select and evolve new proteins that would have higher affinity for their targets, improved stability and ease of production.

The aims of the research were:

"to provide novel binding proteins with affinities for their targets which are much higher than those provided by traditional monoclonals through the use of antibody phage display libraries and combinatorial libraries based upon novel scaffolds.

to design antibody fragment configurations with improved solubility, thermal, proteolytic resistance, and stability in organic solvents and detergents.

to provide methods for manufacture of antibody fragments on a scale, and at a cost acceptable for application in environmental management and as components of topical pharmaceuticals, cosmeceuticals or consumer goods."

=== Development of antibodies for bubonic plague treatment ===
In 1999, Bill headed a research team from Aberdeen University to carry out research at Porton Down to develop antibodies for the treatment of bubonic plague. The work was reportedly commissioned by the Defence Evaluation and Research Agency in response to fears that British forces could be attacked by countries which had been thought to have built up stockpiles of biological weapons. The research was revealed after concerns about the secrecy of work carried out by UK universities at Porton Down were raised by the Scottish National Party.

=== Antibody technologies in the management of pollution ===
As a result of pollution caused by harmful industrial chemicals, international legislation setting minimal levels of organic pollutants in potable and environmental waters and soil were introduced leading to the need for sensitive and cost effective methods for detection and routine monitoring.

This research programme was sponsored by the U.K. Biological Sciences and Biotechnology Research Council (BBSRC) for 7 years and focused on provision of antibody based reagents using herbicides such as atrazine, diuron, mecoprop and paraquat as prototypes. In 1999 it was shown that antibody fragments could offer the possibility of sensitive detection and efficient removal of organic pollutants from the environment.

Initially the insolubility of anti-herbicide antibody fragments when expressed in E. coli had restricted this work, however work later carried out showed that disulfide linked scFvs, termed SCABS, had improved stability in a range of environments.

== Industry ==
Bill Harris spent 9 years (1978–87) with Inveresk Research International, Edinburgh, Scotland, initially as Head of In Vitro Toxicology and then introduced and was Head of Biotechnology. IRI Ltd were a contract research organisation providing safety testing facilities for new chemicals. They later merged with the Charles River Laboratories in Edinburgh, before being acquired by Quotient Bioresearch Limited in 2009. He managed contracts with US. NCI, NIOSH, US Army as well as many European and USA companies. This was the exciting era of environmental toxicology with predictive mutagenicity and carcinogenicity testing of thousands of chemicals in widespread use in pharmaceutical, cosmetic, chemical and food industries and a lot of time was spent visiting and advising companies on the impact of results on their businesses. A broad knowledge of procedures and legal requirements for safety assessment of new drugs during product development programmes was obtained at this time.

During this period, Bill was also technical advisor for investments in biotechnology by Cogent Ltd. This pioneering investment group provided vital funding to projects at the stage between initial university research discovery and industrial product development. In 1987, Cogent Ltd acquired the monoclonal antibody manufacturing company, Bioscot Ltd where Bill then served as Research Director. During this time, he directed the expansion of the companies' business into provision of novel immunoassay technologies and products, and developed an ELISA based test for the environmental monitoring of Legionella pneumophila, marketed by Boots Microcheck.

=== SMART Awards ===
Between 1987 and 1990, Bill was awarded four UK Department of Trade and Industry " SMART" awards for projects related to diagnosis of susceptibility to heart disease, and rapid detection of microbial infection. In 1989 he was a semi-final winner of the Toshiba Year of Invention awards for a programme to remove alcohol from wine. He was co-inventor on 20 process and product patent applications.

=== Scotgen ===
Scotgen was established in 1987 with seedcorn finance from the Founders, an investment by Aberdeen University Research and Innovation Services, and the Scottish Development Agency. This raised around £200,000 and with a small additional loan in 1989, was the only investment in the company until 1993. The Company expanded its contract research business at a rate averaging around 20% per annum and in 1992 had a turnover of approximately $2.0 million with 30% net profit margins. Profit was used to develop own products and in 1991 the first Scotgen product, reshaped human antibodies for respiratory syncytial virus (fatal childhood infection), was licensed to Smith Kline Beecham.

Anti-infective therapeutic products developed up to 1992 included those for treatment of respiratory syncytial virus (RSV), Varicella zoster (chicken pox/shingles), cytomegalovirus and rabies. The RSV product was licensed to Smith Kline Beecham in 1991 but was not pursued after completion of early phase II clinical trials. Four anti-cancer antibodies were developed in collaboration with Sloan-Kettering Institute for Cancer Research and Ludwig Institute of Cancer Research, New York.
