= Jose L. Holguin =

US Air Force colonel (1921–1994)

- Born: February 1, 1921; California
- Died: March 22, 1994 (aged 73); Los Feliz, Los Angeles, California
- Military career
- Allegiance: United States of America
- Branch: United States Air Force
- Rank: Colonel
- Conflicts: World War II
- Awards: Silver Star; Purple Heart; Distinguished Flying Cross; Prisoner of War; Army Commendation medals
- Other work: School administrator

Jose L. Holguin (February 1, 1921 – March 22, 1994) was a United States Air Force colonel, who was the navigator and sole survivor of a World War II mission that ended with a crash on June 26, 1943, in the jungles of New Britain, now Papua New Guinea. Holguin was awarded the Silver Star, the Purple Heart, the Distinguished Flying Cross, the Prisoner of War and Army Commendation medals.

== Early life ==
Jose Luis Holguin, the son of Jose S. Holguin, was born on February 1, 1921, in Santa Ana, California, where his parents moved from Guadalupe, Mexico. Both were descendants of early New Spain settlers of the Guadalupe area from Spain. On his paternal line, he is a descendant of a naval captain for conquistador Hernán Cortés, who is also an ancestor.

His siblings were brother Ruben and sisters Hope and Angelina. Holguin was a member of Eulexian Society, an honor society, during his time at Belmont High School in Los Angeles.

== Career ==
=== World War II ===
Soon after the attack on Pearl Harbor, Holguin joined the Army Air Force and by August 1942 had received his navigator's wings at Mather Field. He then went to Tucson, Arizona for further training with the B-17 Flying Fortresses. By December he was at Port Moresby, New Guinea and with the 43rd Bomb Group. During World War II, he was a navigator and he and his fellow soldiers managed with ineffective charts of the Pacific, difficult weather, and high mountains.

The B-17 plane that he was in was shot down by the Japanese on June 26, 1943, over New Britain, an island in the South Pacific, after they had taken out a Japanese airfield in Rabaul. Of the ten fliers on the plane, he was the only man to survive. He fell out of an open door of the burning plane after it was hit, the pilot and copilot were killed, and the plane went into a dive. He was wearing a parachute and landed as the plane exploded upon crashing into the jungle. With a broken back and having been shot in his leg and jaw, he crawled to the plane's wreckage through the jungle and saw the dead bodies of his fellow crewmen. He made a promise at that time, "The only thing I could do was to tell the (dead) men, in my silent way, that I couldn't take them with me but I would be back to take care of them." After about a month in the jungle, he was found by islanders. In bad shape, he was handed over to the Japanese and held in the Rabaul prisoner of war camp on New Britain for two years. Of 64 people held at the camp, he was one of seven to live through the experience. When he returned from the war, he and his wife visited the families of the members of his crew and was often the first to let them know that the soldiers had died.

=== Post-war service ===
He was discharged from the Army Air Force, but was then with the Air Force Reserve. He received a letter of commendation from the government of Guatemala for his work at Randolph Field, Texas. Beginning June 1946, he began his work with students from South America as a liaison officer and teacher. He had a similar assignment at Williams Field in Arizona. At Mather Air Force Base, he attended the Air Force Bombardment School in 1948 and 1949. He was second in his class for academic and bombing training. By that time he was a major. He served the Strategic Air Command as a radar operator of the B-29 and B-50 bombers and as had the additional role of bombardier and navigator on the B-47 at Castle Air Force Base in California. He then worked on computer technology that improved the accuracy of bombs used during the Korean War. In September 1955, he served the Tactical Requirements Division of the Directorate of Operations as operational staff officer at the Offutt Air Force Base. He still maintained his home at Santa Ana, California. He was then a senior staff official and then became lieutenant colonel.

=== Search for fellow crewmen ===
Holguin retired from the Air Force at 42 years of age, after which he made it a life quest following retirement to find the bodies of his fellow crewmen who died when their bomber was shot down. He made three trips to New Britain, where he found the wreckage of Naughty but Nice, the nickname for the B-17 he and his crewmates operated that had a calendar girl painted on the nose of the plane. Nearby was a shallow grave with partial remains of the soldiers. Unable to identify the men initially, remains of the five of the crewman were buried in Honolulu at the National Memorial Cemetery of the Pacific. He worked with former senator Alan Cranston to have the bodies of his crewmates identified in 1985. Of the nine men who died, he was able to return the bodies of five of the soldiers to the United States for burial. The last four of the nine men were not found by the time Holguin died, but an expedition to New Britain in 2001 resulted in the discovery of more remains. Unable to identify the remains, they were attributed to all nine men.

=== Educator ===
Following his retirement, Holguin worked in Los Angeles as a teacher in a secondary school beginning in 1963 and then became an assistant principal at Verdugo Hills High School.

== Personal life ==
Holguin was married to Celia Rebecca Martinez and they raised six children or had seven children. He suffered from post-traumatic stress disorder following the war, which negatively affected his relationships with his wife and children. He died in his home in Los Feliz, Los Angeles on March 22, 1994, of a heart attack.

== Awards ==
- Navigator Badge
- Silver Star
- Distinguished Flying Cross
- Purple Heart
- Air Medal
- Army Commendation Medal
- Prisoner of War Medal
- Presidential Unit Citation
- American Campaign Medal
- Asiatic-Pacific Campaign Medal with two campaign stars
- World War II Victory Medal
- National Defense Service Medal with star
- Air Force Longevity Service Ribbon with four oak leaf clusters
- Five Overseas Service Bars
