= Bill Harris (television producer) =

William Harris was a television executive based in New York City, United States, currently serving as Senior Vice-President of Production and Broadcast Operations for the A&E Television Networks, which includes cable services A&E, The History Channel, The Biography Channel, Crime and Investigation, History en Espanol, The Military History Channel and History International.

Harris is the CEO and co-owner of Pyewachitt Productions.

Harris served as a Producer-in-Residence and adjunct professor of Film and Media Arts at Sacred Heart University. In 2019, he was named the director of the Community Theater and oversaw its restoration and reopening.
