= Bill Harris (Australian footballer) =

Australian rules footballer

Personal information
- Full name: William James Harris
- Born: 14 May 1877; Brunswick, Victoria
- Died: 12 July 1957 (aged 80); Glen Huntly, Victoria
- Original team: Richmond (VFA) / Windsor
- Height: 170 cm (5 ft 7 in)
- Weight: 67 kg (148 lb)

Playing career^{1}
| Years | Club | Games (Goals) |
| 1900 | St Kilda | 2 (0) |
- ^{1} Playing statistics correct to the end of 1900.

William James Harris (14 May 1877 – 12 July 1957) was an Australian rules footballer who played with St Kilda in the Victorian Football League (VFL).

== Career ==
Bill Harris played for St. Kilda football club in the 1900 season at the age of 23. He played two games with St. Kilda against Collingwood and Essendon.
